= Abyssal plain =

Flat area on the deep ocean floor

Diagrammatic cross-section of an oceanic basin, showing the relationship of the abyssal plain to a continental rise and an oceanic trench

Depiction of the abyssal zone in relation to other major oceanic zones

An abyssal plain is an underwater plain on the deep ocean floor, usually found at depths between 3,000 and 6,000 metres (9,800 and 19,700 ft). Lying generally between the foot of a continental rise and a mid-ocean ridge, abyssal plains cover more than 50% of the Earth's surface. They are among the flattest, smoothest, and least explored regions on Earth. Abyssal plains are key geologic elements of oceanic basins, the other elements being an elevated mid-ocean ridge and flanking abyssal hills.

The creation of the abyssal plain is the result of the spreading of the seafloor (plate tectonics) and the melting of the lower oceanic crust. Magma rises from above the asthenosphere (a layer of the upper mantle), and as this basaltic material reaches the surface at mid-ocean ridges, it forms new oceanic crust, which is constantly pulled sideways by spreading of the seafloor. Abyssal plains result from the blanketing of an originally uneven surface of oceanic crust by fine-grained sediments, mainly clay and silt. Much of this sediment is deposited by turbidity currents that have been channelled from the continental margins along submarine canyons into deeper water. The rest is composed chiefly of pelagic sediments. Metallic nodules are common in some areas of the plains, with varying concentrations of metals, including manganese, iron, nickel, cobalt, and copper. There are also amounts of carbon, nitrogen, phosphorus and silicon, due to material that comes down and decomposes.

Owing in part to their vast size, abyssal plains are believed to be major reservoirs of biodiversity. They also exert significant influence upon ocean carbon cycling, dissolution of calcium carbonate, and atmospheric CO_{2} concentrations over time scales of a hundred to a thousand years. The structure of abyssal ecosystems is strongly influenced by the rate of flux of food to the seafloor and the composition of the material that settles. Factors such as climate change, fishing practices, and ocean fertilization have a substantial effect on patterns of primary production in the euphotic zone. Animals absorb dissolved oxygen from the oxygen-poor waters. Much dissolved oxygen in abyssal plains came from polar regions that had melted long ago. Due to scarcity of oxygen, abyssal plains are inhospitable for organisms that would flourish in the oxygen-enriched waters above. Deep sea coral reefs are mainly found in depths of 3,000 meters and deeper in the abyssal and hadal zones.

Abyssal plains were not recognized as distinct physiographic features of the sea floor until the late 1940s and, until recently, none had been studied on a systematic basis. They are poorly preserved in the sedimentary record, because they tend to be consumed by the subduction process. Due to darkness and a water pressure that can reach about 750 times atmospheric pressure (76 megapascal), abyssal plains are not well explored.

== Oceanic zones ==
Pelagic zones

The ocean can be conceptualized as zones, depending on depth, and presence or absence of sunlight. Nearly all life forms in the ocean depend on the photosynthetic activities of phytoplankton and other marine plants to convert carbon dioxide into organic carbon, which is the basic building block of organic matter. Photosynthesis in turn requires energy from sunlight to drive the chemical reactions that produce organic carbon.

The stratum of the water column nearest the surface of the ocean (sea level) is referred to as the photic zone. The photic zone can be subdivided into two different vertical regions. The uppermost portion of the photic zone, where there is adequate light to support photosynthesis by phytoplankton and plants, is referred to as the euphotic zone (also referred to as the epipelagic zone, or surface zone). The lower portion of the photic zone, where the light intensity is insufficient for photosynthesis, is called the dysphotic zone (dysphotic means "poorly lit" in Greek). The dysphotic zone is also referred to as the mesopelagic zone, or the twilight zone. Its lowermost boundary is at a thermocline of 12 °C (54 °F), which, in the tropics generally lies between 200 and 1,000 metres (660 and 3,280 ft).

The euphotic zone is somewhat arbitrarily defined as extending from the surface to the depth where the light intensity is approximately 0.1–1% of surface sunlight irradiance, depending on season, latitude and degree of water turbidity. In the clearest ocean water, the euphotic zone may extend to a depth of about 150 m, or rarely, up to 200 m. Dissolved substances and solid particles absorb and scatter light, and in coastal regions the high concentration of these substances causes light to be attenuated rapidly with depth. In such areas the euphotic zone may be only a few tens of metres deep or less. The dysphotic zone, where light intensity is considerably less than 1% of surface irradiance, extends from the base of the euphotic zone to about 1,000 m. Extending from the bottom of the photic zone down to the seabed is the aphotic zone, a region of perpetual darkness.

Since the average depth of the ocean is about 4,300 m (14,100 ft), the photic zone represents only a tiny fraction of the ocean's total volume. However, due to its capacity for photosynthesis, the photic zone has the greatest biodiversity and biomass of all oceanic zones. Nearly all primary production in the ocean occurs here. Life forms which inhabit the aphotic zone are often capable of movement upwards through the water column into the photic zone for feeding. Otherwise, they must rely on material sinking from above, or find another source of energy and nutrition, such as occurs in chemosynthetic archaea found near hydrothermal vents and cold seeps.

The aphotic zone can be subdivided into three different vertical regions, based on depth and temperature. First is the bathyal zone, extending from a depth of 1,000 to 3,000 m (3,300 to 9,800 ft), with water temperature decreasing from 12 °C (54 °F) to 4 °C (39 °F) as depth increases. Next is the abyssal zone, extending from a depth of 3,000 to 6,000 m (9,800 to 19,700 ft). The final zone includes the deep oceanic trenches, and is known as the hadal zone. This, the deepest oceanic zone, extends from a depth of 6,000 m to approximately 11,034 m (36,201 ft), at the very bottom of the Mariana Trench, the deepest point on Earth. Abyssal plains are typically in the abyssal zone, at depths from 3,000 to 6,000 m.

The table below illustrates the classification of oceanic zones:

Zone	Subzone (common name)	Depth of zone	Water temperature	Comments
photic	euphotic (epipelagic zone)	0–200 metres	highly variable	
photic	disphotic (mesopelagic zone, or twilight zone)	200–1,000 metres	4 °C or 39 °F – highly variable	
aphotic	bathyal	1,000–3,000 metres	4–12 °C or 39–54 °F	
aphotic	abyssal	3,000–6,000 metres	0–4 °C or 32–39 °F	water temperature may reach as high as 464 °C (867 °F) near hydrothermal vents
aphotic	hadal	below 6,000 metres	1–2.5 °C or 34–36 °F	ambient water temperature increases below 4000 metres due to adiabatic heating

== Formation ==
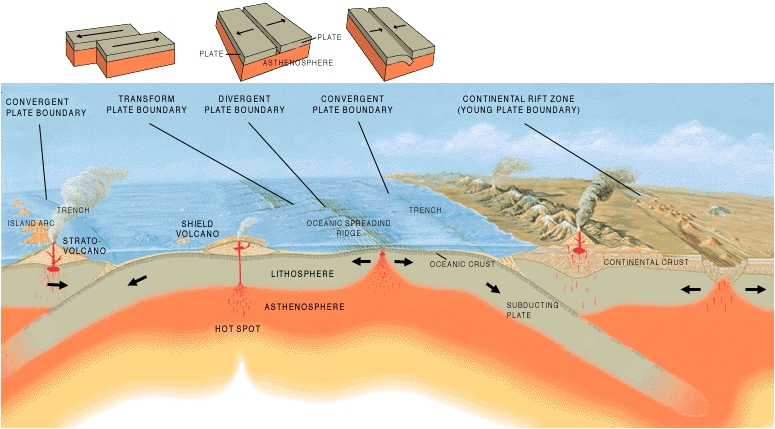
Oceanic crust is formed at a mid-ocean ridge, while the lithosphere is subducted back into the asthenosphere at oceanic trenches

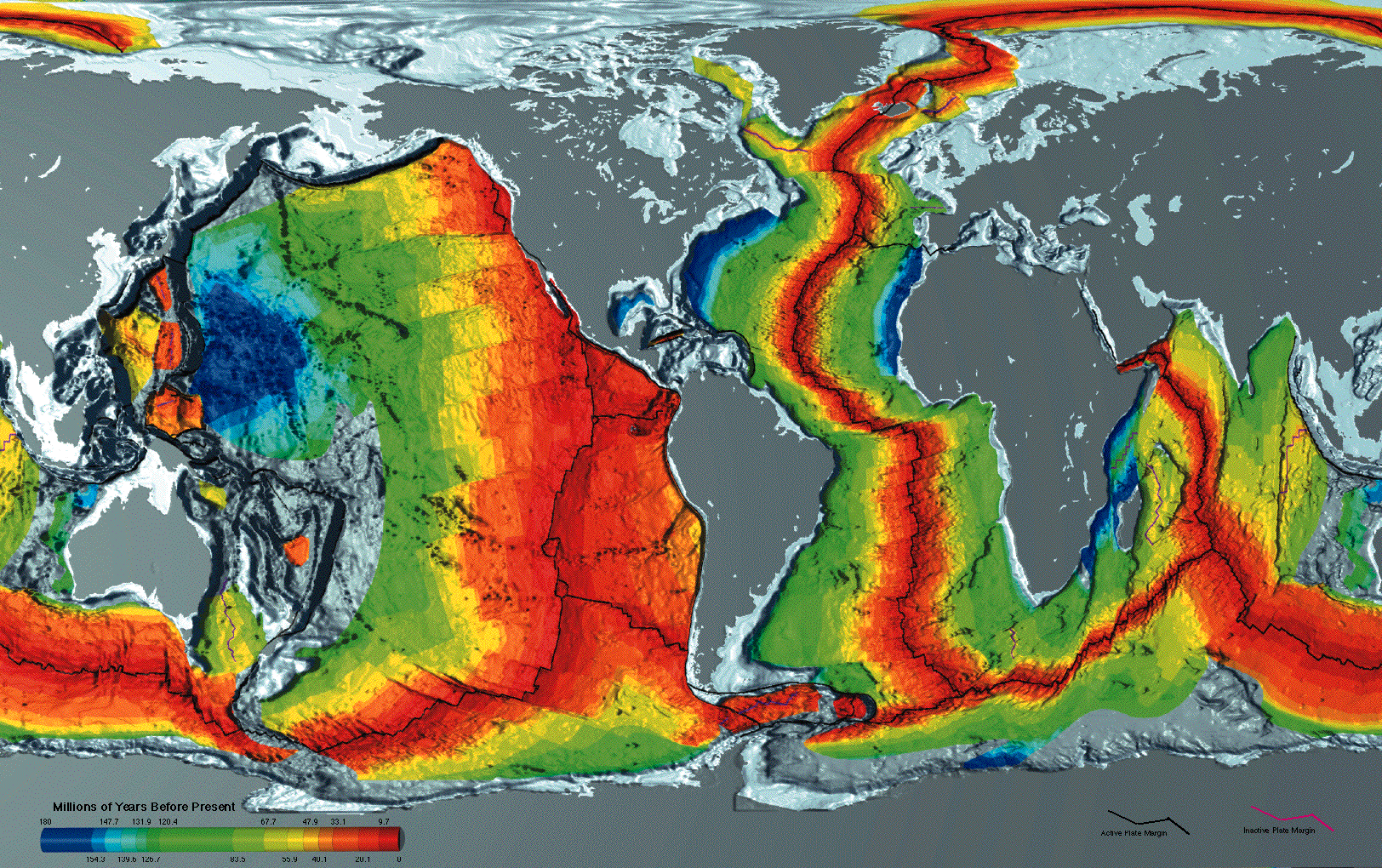
Age of oceanic crust (red is youngest, and blue is oldest)

Oceanic crust, which forms the bedrock of abyssal plains, is continuously being created at mid-ocean ridges (a type of divergent boundary) by a process known as decompression melting. Plume-related decompression melting of solid mantle is responsible for creating ocean islands like the Hawaiian islands, as well as the ocean crust at mid-ocean ridges. This phenomenon is also the most common explanation for flood basalts and oceanic plateaus (two types of large igneous provinces). Decompression melting occurs when the upper mantle is partially melted into magma as it moves upwards under mid-ocean ridges. This upwelling magma then cools and solidifies by conduction and convection of heat to form new oceanic crust. Accretion occurs as mantle is added to the growing edges of a tectonic plate, usually associated with seafloor spreading. The age of oceanic crust is therefore a function of distance from the mid-ocean ridge. The youngest oceanic crust is at the mid-ocean ridges, and it becomes progressively older, cooler and denser as it migrates outwards from the mid-ocean ridges as part of the process called mantle convection.

The lithosphere, which rides atop the asthenosphere, is divided into a number of tectonic plates that are continuously being created and consumed at their opposite plate boundaries. Oceanic crust and tectonic plates are formed and move apart at mid-ocean ridges. Abyssal hills are formed by stretching of the oceanic lithosphere. Consumption or destruction of the oceanic lithosphere occurs at oceanic trenches (a type of convergent boundary, also known as a destructive plate boundary) by a process known as subduction. Oceanic trenches are found at places where the oceanic lithospheric slabs of two different plates meet, and the denser (older) slab begins to descend back into the mantle. At the consumption edge of the plate (the oceanic trench), the oceanic lithosphere has thermally contracted to become quite dense, and it sinks under its own weight in the process of subduction. The subduction process consumes older oceanic lithosphere, so oceanic crust is seldom more than 200 million years old. The overall process of repeated cycles of creation and destruction of oceanic crust is known as the Supercontinent cycle, first proposed by Canadian geophysicist and geologist John Tuzo Wilson.

New oceanic crust, closest to the mid-oceanic ridges, is mostly basalt at shallow levels and has a rugged topography. The roughness of this topography is a function of the rate at which the mid-ocean ridge is spreading (the spreading rate). Magnitudes of spreading rates vary quite significantly. Typical values for fast-spreading ridges are greater than 100 mm/yr, while slow-spreading ridges are typically less than 20 mm/yr. Studies have shown that the slower the spreading rate, the rougher the new oceanic crust will be, and vice versa. It is thought this phenomenon is due to faulting at the mid-ocean ridge when the new oceanic crust was formed. These faults pervading the oceanic crust, along with their bounding abyssal hills, are the most common tectonic and topographic features on the surface of the Earth. The process of seafloor spreading helps to explain the concept of continental drift in the theory of plate tectonics.

The flat appearance of mature abyssal plains results from the blanketing of this originally uneven surface of oceanic crust by fine-grained sediments, mainly clay and silt. Much of this sediment is deposited from turbidity currents that have been channeled from the continental margins along submarine canyons down into deeper water. The remainder of the sediment comprises chiefly dust (clay particles) blown out to sea from land, and the remains of small marine plants and animals which sink from the upper layer of the ocean, known as pelagic sediments. The total sediment deposition rate in remote areas is estimated at two to three centimeters per thousand years. Sediment-covered abyssal plains are less common in the Pacific Ocean than in other major ocean basins because sediments from turbidity currents are trapped in oceanic trenches that border the Pacific.

Abyssal plains are typically covered by deep sea, but during parts of the Messinian salinity crisis much of the Mediterranean Sea's abyssal plain was exposed to air as an empty deep hot dry salt-floored sink.

== Discovery ==
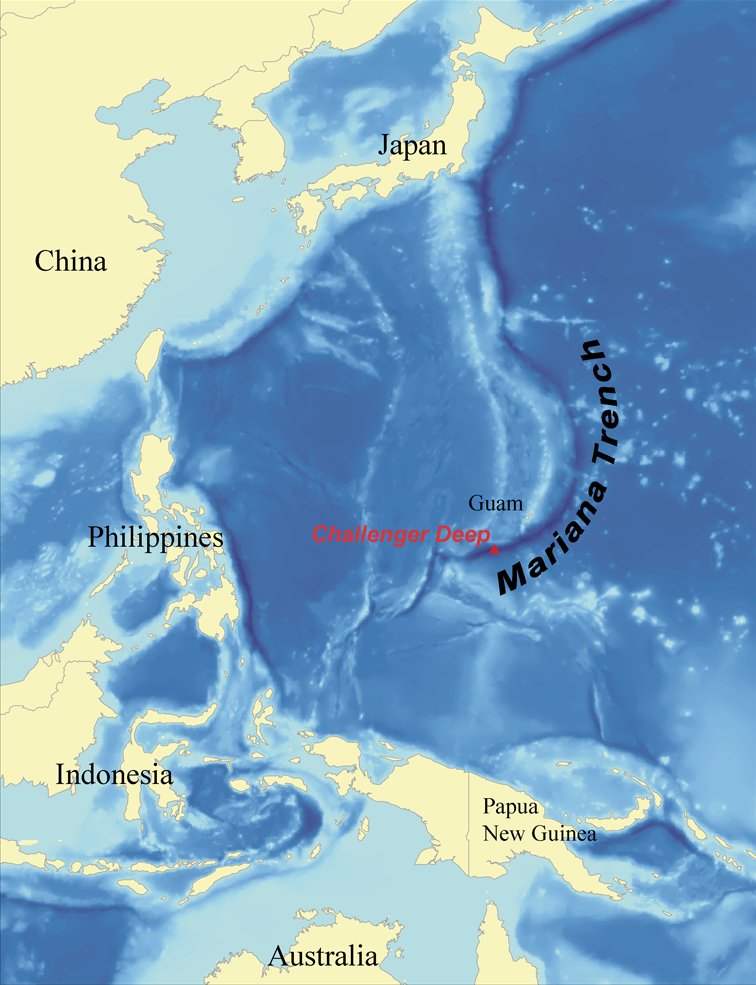
Location of the Challenger Deep in the Mariana Trench

The landmark scientific expedition (December 1872 – May 1876) of the British Royal Navy survey ship HMS Challenger yielded a tremendous amount of bathymetric data, much of which has been confirmed by subsequent researchers. Bathymetric data obtained during the course of the Challenger expedition enabled scientists to draw maps, which provided a rough outline of certain major submarine terrain features, such as the edge of the continental shelves and the Mid-Atlantic Ridge. This discontinuous set of data points was obtained by the simple technique of taking soundings by lowering long lines from the ship to the seabed.

The Challenger expedition was followed by the 1879–1881 expedition of the Jeannette, led by United States Navy Lieutenant George Washington DeLong. The team sailed across the Chukchi Sea and recorded meteorological and astronomical data in addition to taking soundings of the seabed. The ship became trapped in the ice pack near Wrangel Island in September 1879, and was ultimately crushed and sunk in June 1881.

The Jeannette expedition was followed by the 1893–1896 Arctic expedition of Norwegian explorer Fridtjof Nansen aboard the Fram, which proved that the Arctic Ocean was a deep oceanic basin, uninterrupted by any significant land masses north of the Eurasian continent.

Beginning in 1916, Canadian physicist Robert William Boyle and other scientists of the Anti-Submarine Detection Investigation Committee (ASDIC) undertook research which ultimately led to the development of sonar technology. Acoustic sounding equipment was developed which could be operated much more rapidly than the sounding lines, thus enabling the German Meteor expedition aboard the German research vessel Meteor (1925–27) to take frequent soundings on east-west Atlantic transects. Maps produced from these techniques show the major Atlantic basins, but the depth precision of these early instruments was not sufficient to reveal the flat featureless abyssal plains.

As technology improved, measurement of depth, latitude and longitude became more precise and it became possible to collect more or less continuous sets of data points. This allowed researchers to draw accurate and detailed maps of large areas of the ocean floor. Use of a continuously recording fathometer enabled Tolstoy & Ewing in the summer of 1947 to identify and describe the first abyssal plain. This plain, south of Newfoundland, is now known as the Sohm Abyssal Plain. Following this discovery many other examples were found in all the oceans.

The Challenger Deep is the deepest surveyed point of all of Earth's oceans; it is at the south end of the Mariana Trench near the Mariana Islands group. The depression is named after HMS Challenger, whose researchers made the first recordings of its depth on 23 March 1875 at station 225. The reported depth was 4,475 fathoms (8184 m) based on two separate soundings. On 1 June 2009, sonar mapping of the Challenger Deep by the Simrad EM120 multibeam sonar bathymetry system aboard the R/V Kilo Moana indicated a maximum depth of 10,971 m (6.82 miles). The sonar system uses phase and amplitude bottom detection, with an accuracy of better than 0.2% of water depth (an error of about 22 m at this depth).

== Terrain features ==
=== Hydrothermal vents ===
In this phase diagram, the green dotted line illustrates the anomalous behavior of water. The solid green line marks the melting point and the blue line the boiling point, showing how they vary with pressure.

A rare but important terrain feature found in the bathyal, abyssal and hadal zones is the hydrothermal vent. In contrast to the approximately 2 °C ambient water temperature at these depths, water emerges from these vents at temperatures ranging from 60 °C up to as high as 464 °C. Due to the high hydrostatic pressure at these depths, water may exist in either its liquid form or as a supercritical fluid at such temperatures.

At a hydrostatic pressure of 218 atmospheres, the critical point of water is 375 °C. At a depth of 3,000 m, the hydrostatic pressure of sea water is more than 300 atmospheres (as salt water is denser than fresh water). At this depth and pressure, seawater becomes supercritical at a temperature of 407 °C (see image). However the increase in salinity at this depth pushes the water closer to its critical point. Thus, water emerging from the hottest parts of some hydrothermal vents, black smokers and submarine volcanoes can be a supercritical fluid, possessing physical properties between those of a gas and those of a liquid.

Sister Peak (Comfortless Cove Hydrothermal Field, 4°48′S 12°22′W, elevation −2,996 m), Shrimp Farm and Mephisto (Red Lion Hydrothermal Field, 4°48′S 12°23′W, elevation −3,047 m), are three hydrothermal vents of the black smoker category, on the Mid-Atlantic Ridge near Ascension Island. They are presumed to have been active since an earthquake shook the region in 2002. These vents have been observed to vent phase-separated, vapor-type fluids. In 2008, sustained exit temperatures of up to 407 °C were recorded at one of these vents, with a peak recorded temperature of up to 464 °C. These thermodynamic conditions exceed the critical point of seawater, and are the highest temperatures recorded to date from the seafloor. This is the first reported evidence for direct magmatic-hydrothermal interaction on a slow-spreading mid-ocean ridge. The initial stages of a vent chimney begin with the deposition of the mineral anhydrite. Sulfides of copper, iron, and zinc then precipitate in the chimney gaps, making it less porous over the course of time. Hydrothermal vent chimney growth on the order of 30 cm (1 ft) per day has been recorded. An April 2007 exploration of the deep-sea vents off the coast of Fiji found those vents to be a significant source of dissolved iron (see iron cycle).

Hydrothermal vents in the deep ocean typically form along the mid-ocean ridges, such as the East Pacific Rise and the Mid-Atlantic Ridge. These are locations where two tectonic plates are diverging and new crust is being formed.

=== Cold seeps ===
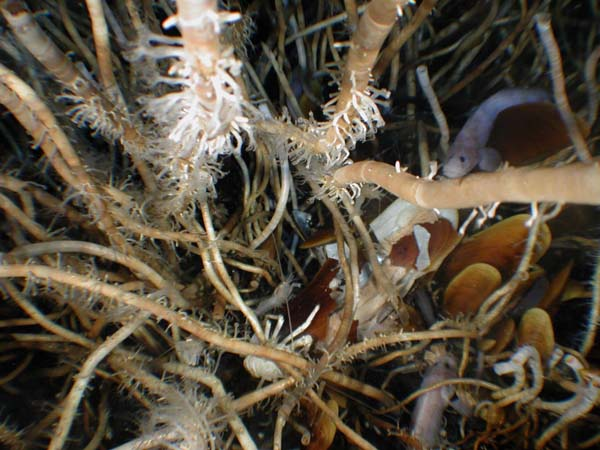
Tubeworms and soft corals at a cold seep 3000 meters deep on the Florida Escarpment. Eelpouts, a galatheid crab, and an alvinocarid shrimp are feeding on chemosynthetic mytilid mussels.

Another unusual feature found in the abyssal and hadal zones is the cold seep, sometimes called a cold vent. This is an area of the seabed where seepage of hydrogen sulfide, methane and other hydrocarbon-rich fluid occurs, often in the form of a deep-sea brine pool. The first cold seeps were discovered in 1983, at a depth of 3,200 m in the Gulf of Mexico. Since then, cold seeps have been discovered in many other areas of the World Ocean, including the Monterey Submarine Canyon just off Monterey Bay, California, the Sea of Japan, off the Pacific coast of Costa Rica, off the Atlantic coast of Africa, off the coast of Alaska, and under an ice shelf in Antarctica.

== Biodiversity ==
Though the plains were once assumed to be vast, desert-like habitats, research over the past decade [when?] or so shows that they teem with a wide variety of microbial life. However, ecosystem structure and function at the deep seafloor have historically been poorly studied because of the size and remoteness of the abyss. Recent oceanographic expeditions conducted by an international group of scientists from the Census of Diversity of Abyssal Marine Life (CeDAMar) have found an extremely high level of biodiversity on abyssal plains, with up to 2,000 species of bacteria, 250 species of protozoans, and 500 species of invertebrates (worms, crustaceans and molluscs), typically found at single abyssal sites. New species make up more than 80% of the thousands of seafloor invertebrate species collected at any abyssal station, highlighting our heretofore poor understanding of abyssal diversity and evolution. Richer biodiversity is associated with areas of known phytodetritus input and higher organic carbon flux.

Abyssobrotula galatheae, a species of cusk eel in the family Ophidiidae, is among the deepest-living species of fish. In 1970, one specimen was trawled from a depth of 8,370 m (27,460 ft) in the Puerto Rico Trench. The animal was dead, however, upon arrival at the surface. In 2008, the hadal snailfish (Pseudoliparis amblystomopsis) was observed and recorded at a depth of 7,700 m (25,300 ft) in the Japan Trench. In December 2014 a type of snailfish was filmed at a depth of 8,145 m, followed in May 2017 by another snailfish filmed at 8,178 m. These are the deepest living fish recorded to date. Other fish of the abyssal zone include the fishes of the family Ipnopidae, which includes the abyssal spiderfish (Bathypterois longipes), tripodfish (Bathypterois grallator), feeler fish (Bathypterois longifilis), and the black lizardfish (Bathysauropsis gracilis). Some members of this family have been recorded from depths of more than 6,000 m.

CeDAMar scientists have demonstrated that some abyssal and hadal species have a cosmopolitan distribution. One example of this would be protozoan foraminiferans, certain species of which are distributed from the Arctic to the Antarctic. Other faunal groups, such as the polychaete worms and isopod crustaceans, appear to be endemic to certain specific plains and basins. Many apparently unique taxa of nematode worms have also been recently discovered on abyssal plains. This suggests that the deep ocean has fostered adaptive radiations. The taxonomic composition of the nematode fauna in the abyssal Pacific is similar, but not identical to, that of the North Atlantic. A list of some of the species that have been discovered or redescribed by CeDAMar can be found here.

Eleven of the 31 described species of Monoplacophora (a class of mollusks) live below 2,000 m. Of these 11 species, two live exclusively in the hadal zone. The greatest number of monoplacophorans are from the eastern Pacific Ocean along the oceanic trenches. However, no abyssal monoplacophorans have yet been found in the Western Pacific and only one abyssal species has been identified in the Indian Ocean. Of the 922 known species of chitons (from the Polyplacophora class of mollusks), 22 species (2.4%) are reported to live below 2,000 m and two of them are restricted to the abyssal plain. Although genetic studies are lacking, at least six of these species are thought to be eurybathic (capable of living in a wide range of depths), having been reported as occurring from the sublittoral to abyssal depths. A large number of the polyplacophorans from great depths are herbivorous or xylophagous, which could explain the difference between the distribution of monoplacophorans and polyplacophorans in the world's oceans.

Peracarid crustaceans, including isopods, are known to form a significant part of the macrobenthic community that is responsible for scavenging on large food falls onto the sea floor. In 2000, scientists of the Diversity of the deep Atlantic benthos (DIVA 1) expedition (cruise M48/1 of the German research vessel RV Meteor III) discovered and collected three new species of the Asellota suborder of benthic isopods from the abyssal plains of the Angola Basin in the South Atlantic Ocean. In 2003, De Broyer et al. collected some 68,000 peracarid crustaceans from 62 species from baited traps deployed in the Weddell Sea, Scotia Sea, and off the South Shetland Islands. They found that about 98% of the specimens belonged to the amphipod superfamily Lysianassoidea, and 2% to the isopod family Cirolanidae. Half of these species were collected from depths of greater than 1000 meters.

In 2005, the Japan Agency for Marine-Earth Science and Technology (JAMSTEC) remotely operated vehicle, KAIKO, collected sediment core from the Challenger Deep. 432 living specimens of soft-walled foraminifera were identified in the sediment samples. Foraminifera are single-celled protists that construct shells. There are an estimated 4,000 species of living foraminifera. Out of the 432 organisms collected, the overwhelming majority of the sample consisted of simple, soft-shelled foraminifera, with others representing species of the complex, multi-chambered genera Leptohalysis and Reophax. Overall, 85% of the specimens consisted of soft-shelled allogromiids. This is unusual compared to samples of sediment-dwelling organisms from other deep-sea environments, where the percentage of organic-walled foraminifera ranges from 5% to 20% of the total. Small organisms with hard calciferous shells have trouble growing at extreme depths because the water at that depth is severely lacking in calcium carbonate. The giant (5–20 cm) foraminifera known as xenophyophores are only found at depths of 500–10,000 m (1,600–32,800 ft), where they can occur in great numbers and greatly increase animal diversity due to their bioturbation and provision of living habitat for small animals.

While similar lifeforms have been known to exist in shallower oceanic trenches (>7,000 m) and on the abyssal plain, the lifeforms discovered in the Challenger Deep may represent independent taxa from those shallower ecosystems. This preponderance of soft-shelled organisms at the Challenger Deep may be a result of selection pressure. Millions of years ago, the Challenger Deep was shallower than it is now. Over the past six to nine million years, as the Challenger Deep grew to its present depth, many of the species present in the sediment of that ancient biosphere were unable to adapt to the increasing water pressure and changing environment. Those species that were able to adapt may have been the ancestors of the organisms currently endemic to the Challenger Deep.

Polychaetes occur throughout the Earth's oceans at all depths, from forms that live as plankton near the surface, to the deepest oceanic trenches. The robot ocean probe Nereus observed a 2–3 cm specimen (still unclassified) of polychaete at the bottom of the Challenger Deep on 31 May 2009. There are more than 10,000 described species of polychaetes; they can be found in nearly every marine environment. Some species live in the coldest ocean temperatures of the hadal zone, while others can be found in the extremely hot waters adjacent to hydrothermal vents.

Within the abyssal and hadal zones, the areas around submarine hydrothermal vents and cold seeps have by far the greatest biomass and biodiversity per unit area. Fueled by the chemicals dissolved in the vent fluids, these areas are often home to large and diverse communities of thermophilic, halophilic and other extremophilic prokaryotic microorganisms (such as those of the sulfide-oxidizing genus Beggiatoa), often arranged in large bacterial mats near cold seeps. In these locations, chemosynthetic archaea and bacteria typically form the base of the food chain. Although the process of chemosynthesis is entirely microbial, these chemosynthetic microorganisms often support vast ecosystems consisting of complex multicellular organisms through symbiosis. These communities are characterized by species such as vesicomyid clams, mytilid mussels, limpets, isopods, giant tube worms, soft corals, eelpouts, galatheid crabs, and alvinocarid shrimp. The deepest seep community discovered thus far is in the Japan Trench, at a depth of 7700 meters.

Probably the most important ecological characteristic of abyssal ecosystems is energy limitation. Abyssal seafloor communities are considered to be food limited because benthic production depends on the input of detrital organic material produced in the euphotic zone, thousands of meters above. Most of the organic flux arrives as an attenuated rain of small particles (typically, only 0.5–2% of net primary production in the euphotic zone), which decreases inversely with water depth. The small particle flux can be augmented by the fall of larger carcasses and downslope transport of organic material near continental margins.

== Exploitation of resources ==
In addition to their high biodiversity, abyssal plains are of great current and future commercial and strategic interest. For example, they may be used for the legal and illegal disposal of large structures such as ships and oil rigs, radioactive waste and other hazardous waste, such as munitions. They may also be attractive sites for deep-sea fishing, and extraction of oil and gas and other minerals. Future deep-sea waste disposal activities that could be significant by 2025 include emplacement of sewage and sludge, carbon sequestration, and disposal of dredge spoils.

As fish stocks dwindle in the upper ocean, deep-sea fisheries are increasingly being targeted for exploitation. Because deep sea fish are long-lived and slow growing, these deep-sea fisheries are not thought to be sustainable in the long term given current management practices. Changes in primary production in the photic zone are expected to alter the standing stocks in the food-limited aphotic zone.

Hydrocarbon exploration in deep water occasionally results in significant environmental degradation resulting mainly from accumulation of contaminated drill cuttings, but also from oil spills. While the oil blowout involved in the Deepwater Horizon oil spill in the Gulf of Mexico originates from a wellhead only 1,500 m below the ocean surface, it nevertheless illustrates the kind of environmental disaster that can result from mishaps related to offshore drilling for oil and gas.

Sediments of certain abyssal plains contain abundant mineral resources, notably polymetallic nodules. These potato-sized concretions of manganese, iron, nickel, cobalt, and copper, distributed on the seafloor at depths of greater than 4,000 m, are of significant commercial interest. The area of maximum commercial interest for polymetallic nodule mining (called the Pacific nodule province) lies in international waters of the Pacific Ocean, stretching from 118°–157°, and from 9°–16°N, an area of more than 3 million km^{2}. The abyssal Clarion-Clipperton fracture zone (CCFZ) is an area within the Pacific nodule province that is currently under exploration for its mineral potential.

Eight commercial contractors are currently licensed by the International Seabed Authority (an intergovernmental organization established to organize and control all mineral-related activities in the international seabed area beyond the limits of national jurisdiction) to explore nodule resources and to test mining techniques in eight claim areas, each covering 150,000 km^{2}. When mining ultimately begins, each mining operation is projected to directly disrupt 300–800 km^{2} of seafloor per year and disturb the benthic fauna over an area 5–10 times that size due to redeposition of suspended sediments. Thus, over the 15-year projected duration of a single mining operation, nodule mining might severely damage abyssal seafloor communities over areas of 20,000 to 45,000 km^{2} (a zone at least the size of Massachusetts).

Limited knowledge of the taxonomy, biogeography and natural history of deep sea communities prevents accurate assessment of the risk of species extinctions from large-scale mining. Data acquired from the abyssal North Pacific and North Atlantic suggest that deep-sea ecosystems may be adversely affected by mining operations on decadal time scales. In 1978, a dredge aboard the Hughes Glomar Explorer, operated by the American mining consortium Ocean Minerals Company (OMCO), made a mining track at a depth of 5,000 m in the nodule fields of the CCFZ. In 2004, the French Research Institute for Exploitation of the Sea (IFREMER) conducted the Nodinaut expedition to this mining track (which is still visible on the seabed) to study the long-term effects of this physical disturbance on the sediment and its benthic fauna. Samples taken of the superficial sediment revealed that its physical and chemical properties had not shown any recovery since the disturbance made 26 years earlier. On the other hand, the biological activity measured in the track by instruments aboard the crewed submersible bathyscaphe Nautile did not differ from a nearby unperturbed site. This data suggests that the benthic fauna and nutrient fluxes at the water–sediment interface has fully recovered.

== See also ==
- List of oceanic landforms
- List of submarine topographical features
- Oceanic ridge
- Physical oceanography

== Bibliography ==
- Böggemann M.; Purschke G. (2005). "Abyssal benthic Syllidae (Annelida: Polychaeta) from the Angola Basin". Organisms Diversity & Evolution. 5 (Supplement 1): 221–226. doi:10.1016/j.ode.2004.11.006.
- Bohn, J.M. (2005). "On two rare abyssal Myriotrochidae (Echinodermata: Holothuroidea: Apodida) new to the South Atlantic: Siniotrochus myriodontus Gage and Billet, 1986 and Lepidotrochus parvidiscus angolensis subsp. nov". Organisms Diversity & Evolution. 5 (Supplement 1): 231–238. doi:10.1016/j.ode.2004.11.008.
- Brandt A.; Brenke N.; Andres H.-G.; Brix S.; Guerrero-Kommritz J.; Mühlenhardt-Siegel U.; Wägele J.-W. (2005). "Diversity of peracarid crustaceans (Malacostraca) from the abyssal plain of the Angola Basin". Organisms Diversity & Evolution. 5: 105–112. doi:10.1016/j.ode.2004.10.007.
- Condie, Kent C. (1997). Plate Tectonics and Crustal Evolution. Boston: Butterworth-Heinemann Ltd. ISBN 978-0-7506-3386-4.
- Csirke, Jorge (1997). "II. The Limits of Marine Productivity" (PDF). In Laws, Edward A. (ed.). El Niño and the Peruvian Anchovy Fishery (series: Global Change Instruction Program). Vol. 9. Sausalito: University Science Books. pp. 118–121. doi:10.1023/A:1008801515441. ISBN 978-0-935702-80-4. S2CID 29314639. Archived from the original (PDF) on 10 June 2011.
- Gad G. (2005). "Giant Higgins-larvae with paedogenetic reproduction from the deep sea of the Angola Basin- evidence for a new life cycle and for abyssal gigantism in Loricifera?". Organisms Diversity & Evolution. 5 (Supplement 1): 59–76. doi:10.1016/j.ode.2004.10.005.
- Gill Adrian E. (1982). Atmosphere-Ocean Dynamics. San Diego: Academic Press. ISBN 978-0-12-283520-9.
- Gooday A.J.; Nomaki H.; Kitazato H. (2008). "Modern deep-sea benthic foraminifera: a brief review of their morphology-based biodiversity and trophic diversity". Geological Society, London, Special Publications. 303 (1): 97–119. Bibcode:2008GSLSP.303...97G. doi:10.1144/SP303.8. S2CID 129698419.
- Gooday A.J.; Kamenskaya O.E.; Cedhagen T. (2007). "New and little-known Komokiacea (Foraminifera) from the bathyal and abyssal Weddell Sea and adjacent areas". Zoological Journal of the Linnean Society. 151 (2): 219–251. doi:10.1111/j.1096-3642.2007.00326.x.
- Gooday A.J.; Malzone G. (2004). "Hyperammina micaceus sp. nov.: a new foraminiferan species (Protista) from the Porcupine Abyssal Plain, Northeast Atlantic". Journal of Micropalaeontology. 23 (2): 171–179. Bibcode:2004JMicP..23..171G. doi:10.1144/jm.23.2.171.
- Janussen D.; Tendal O.S. (2007). "Diversity and distribution of Porifera in the bathyal and abyssal Weddell Sea and adjacent areas". Deep-Sea Research Part II. 54 (16–17): 1864–1875. Bibcode:2007DSRII..54.1864J. doi:10.1016/j.dsr2.2007.07.012.
- Markhaseva E.L.; Schulz K. (2006). "Sensiava longiseta (Copepoda, calanoidea): a new genus and species from the abyssal of the Weddell Sea". Zootaxa. 1368: 1–18. doi:10.11646/zootaxa.1368.1.1.
- Mühlenhardt-Siegel U. (2008). "Phalloleucon abyssalis, a new cumacean genus and species (Crustacea: Peracarida: Leuconidae) from the Peru Basin". Zootaxa (1829). pp. 61–68.
- Mursch, A.; Brenke, N.; Wägele, J.W. (2008). "Results of the DIVA-1 expedition of RV "Meteor" (Cruise M48:1): Three new species of Munnopsidae Sars, 1864 from abyssal depths of the Angola Basin (Crustacea: Isopoda: Asellota)" (PDF). In Martinez, Pedro; Brix, Arbizu & Saskia (eds.). Bringing light into deep-sea biodiversity (Zootaxa 1866). Auckland, New Zealand: Magnolia Press. ISBN 978-1-86977-260-4.
- Nozawa F.; Kitazato H.; Tsuchiya M.; Gooday A.J. (2006). "'Live' benthic foraminifera at an abyssal site in the equatorial Pacific nodule province: abundance, diversity and taxonomic composition". Deep-Sea Research Part I. 53 (8): 1406–1422. Bibcode:2006DSRI...53.1406N. doi:10.1016/j.dsr.2006.06.001.
- Sabbatini A.; Morigi C.; Negri A.; Gooday A.J. (2007). "Distribution and Biodiversity of Stained Monothalamous Foraminifera from Templejord, Svalbard". Journal of Foraminiferal Research. 37 (2): 93–106. Bibcode:2007JForR..37...93S. doi:10.2113/gsjfr.37.2.93.
- Schrödl M.; Linse K.; Schwabe E. (2006). "Review on the distribution and biology of Antarctic Monoplacophora, with first abyssal record of Laevipilina antarctica". Polar Biology. 29 (9): 721–727. Bibcode:2006PoBio..29..721S. doi:10.1007/s00300-006-0132-7. S2CID 23753587.
- Schwabe E.; Bohn J.M.; Engl W.; Linse K.; Schrödl M. (2007). "Rich and rare – first insights into species diversity and abundance of Antarctic abyssal Gastropoda (Mollusca)". Deep-Sea Research Part II. 54 (16–17): 1831–1847. Bibcode:2007DSRII..54.1831S. doi:10.1016/j.dsr2.2007.07.010.
- Sebastian S.; Raes M.; De Mesel I.; Vanreusel A. (2007). "Comparison of the nematode fauna from the Weddell Sea Abyssal Plain with two North Atlantic abyssal sites". Deep-Sea Research Part II. 54 (16–17): 1727–1736. Bibcode:2007DSRII..54.1727S. doi:10.1016/j.dsr2.2007.07.004.
- Seifried S.; Plum Ch.; Schulz M. (2007). "A new species of Parabradya Lang, 1944 (Copepoda: Harpacticoida: Ectinosomatidae) from the abyssal plain of the Angola Basin" (PDF). Zootaxa. 1432: 1–21. doi:10.11646/zootaxa.1432.1.1.
- Smith, Craig R.; Paterson, Gordon; Lambshead, John; Glover, Adrian G.; Gooday, Andrew; Rogers, Alex; Sibuet, Myriam; Kitazato, Hiroshi; Galéron, Joëlle; Menot, Lenaïck (2008). "Biodiversity, species ranges, and gene flow in the abyssal Pacific nodule province: predicting and managing the impacts of deep seabed mining" (PDF). International Seabed Authority Technical Study: No.3. Kingston, Jamaica: International Seabed Authority. ISBN 978-976-95217-2-8. OCLC 236437700. Archived from the original (PDF) on 23 July 2008.
- Stewart, Robert H. (2007). Introduction to Physical Oceanography (PDF). College Station: Texas A&M University. OCLC 169907785.
- Willen E. (2005). "A new species of Paranannopus Lang, 1936 (Copepoda, Harpacticoida, Pseudotachidiidae) with atrophic mouthparts from the abyssal of the Angola Basin". Organisms Diversity & Evolution. 5 (Supplement 1): 19–27. doi:10.1016/j.ode.2004.10.002.
- Yasuhara M.; Cronin T.M.; Martinez Arbizu P. (2008). "Abyssal ostracods from the South and Equatorial Atlantic Ocean: biological and paleoceanographic implications". Deep-Sea Research Part I. 55 (4): 490–497. Bibcode:2008DSRI...55..490Y. doi:10.1016/j.dsr.2008.01.004.
