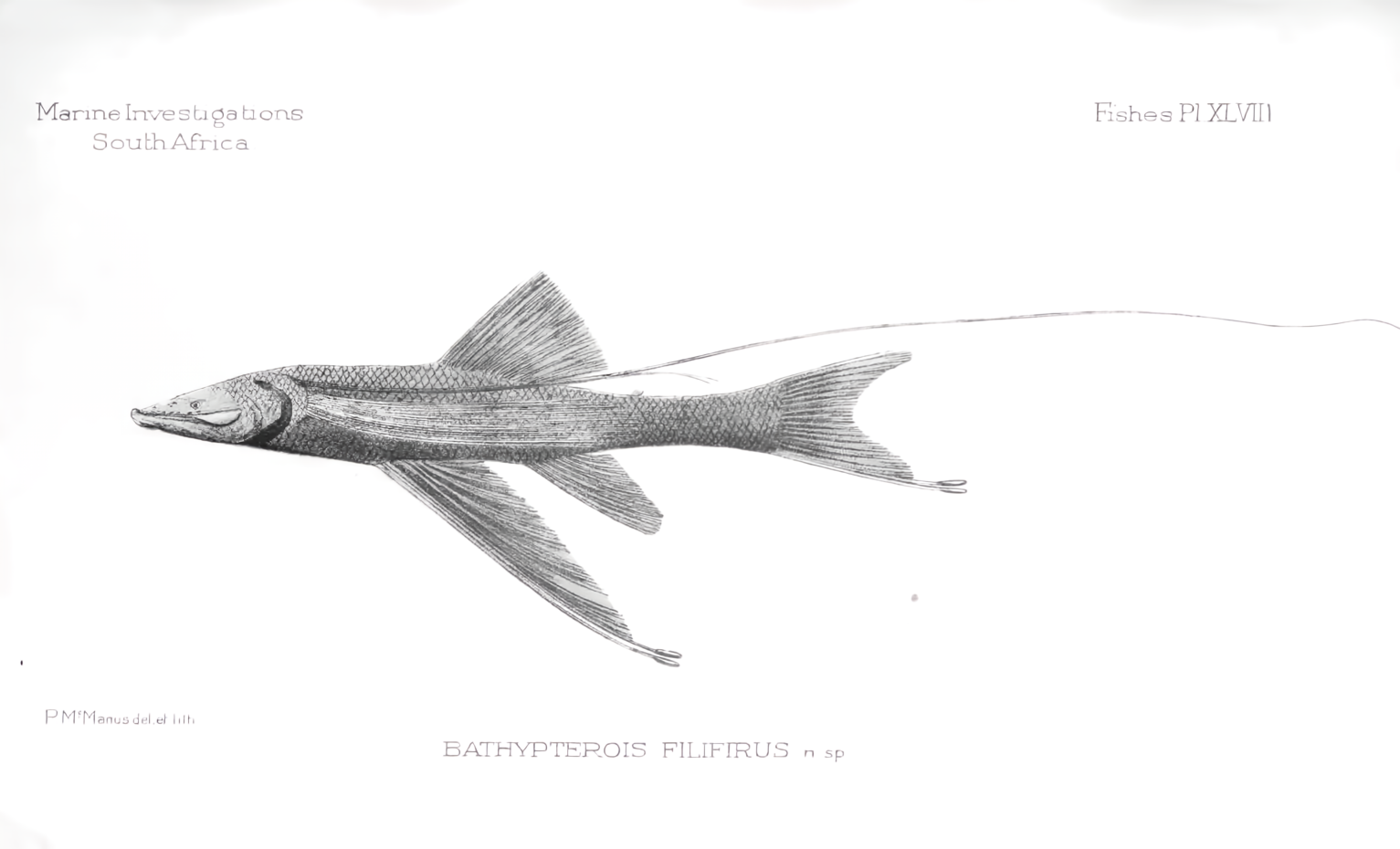

Conservation status
- Least Concern (IUCN 3.1)

Scientific classification
- Kingdom: Animalia
- Phylum: Chordata
- Class: Actinopterygii
- Order: Aulopiformes
- Family: Ipnopidae
- Genus: Bathypterois
- Species: B. filiferus

Binomial name
- Bathypterois filiferus Gilchrist, 1906

= Bathypterois filiferus =

Species of ray-finned fish

Bathypterois filiferus, commonly known as bighanded feelerfish, is a species of deep sea tripod fish in the family Ipnopidae. It is related to the more well-known Bathypterois grallator and is a member of the subgenus Bathycygnus, lacking a subcaudal notch. The species is known off the coast of South Africa, Brazil, and Australia at a depth of 1,055–2,835 m (3,460–9,300 ft).

== Description ==
The bighanded feelerfish, like other tripod fish, bears a streamlined body with highly modified pectoral fins; they are not connected by a membrane like in other species of fish. The first two pectoral fin rays are united, parting at the tip, giving the appearance of a bifid fin ray. The uppermost pectoral fin ray is described as "very long" and "nearly twice the length of the body, reaching far beyond the tip of the caudal."

Their pelvic fins are highly modified as well, as with all tripod fish. They are long and stiffened, with this species having longer pelvic fins than most others of the genus. Curiously, the outer two pectoral fin rays are independent of one another.

The species has 14-16 dorsal fin rays, 9-10 anal fin rays, 8 pelvic fin rays, and 13-16 pectoral fin rays. No count of caudal fin rays was given. It also lacks a subcaudal notch, placing it within the subgenus Bathycygnus.

No details of coloration were given in the initial article, but it was described as "brownish" 19 years after description. Coloration of the specimens has been described as pale brown with scales of a greenish tone as well as transparent or brownish fins. Other defining physical features include it being described with "thick scales" and of "large size", with a SL of 144–200 mm (5.7–7.9 in).
