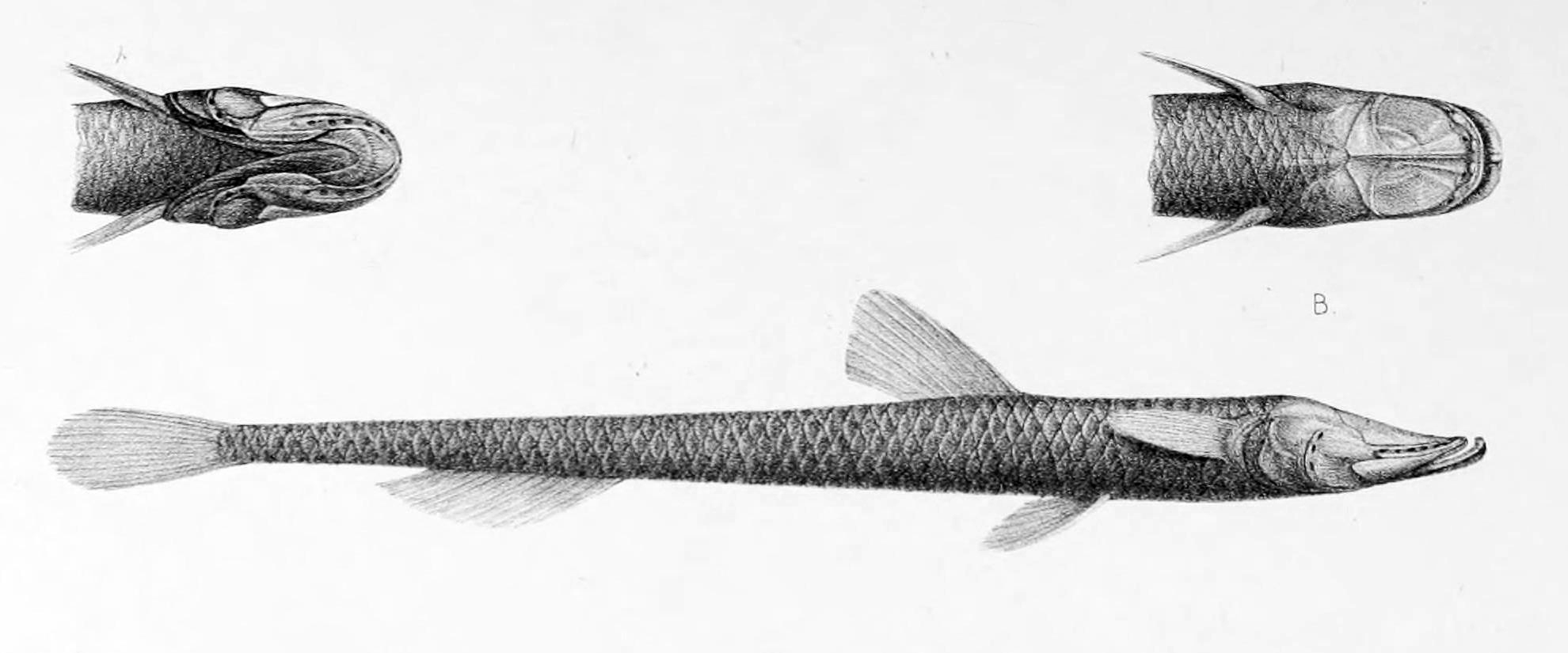
- Ipnops murrayi

Scientific classification
- Kingdom: Animalia
- Phylum: Chordata
- Class: Actinopterygii
- Order: Aulopiformes
- Family: Ipnopidae
- Genus: Ipnops; Günther, 1878

Synonyms
- Ipnoceps Fowler, 1943; Lychnoculus Murray, 1877

= Ipnops =

Genus of deep-sea fishes

Ipnops is a genus of deep-sea fish in the family Ipnopidae, which also includes the better-known tripodfish (Bathypterois grallator). Ipnops are small, slender fish that live close to the ocean floor in the bathyal and abyssal zones. The genus is notable for its unusual eyes.

== Species ==
There are currently four recognized species in this genus:

- Ipnops agassizii Garman, 1899 (grideye fish)
- Ipnops meadi J. G. Nielsen, 1966
- Ipnops murrayi Günther, 1878
- Ipnops pristibrachium (Fowler, 1943)

== Distribution ==
Specimens of I. murrayi and I. agassizi have been caught at depths of 1392–3475 m; I. murrayi occurs in the Atlantic Ocean while I. agassizi occurs in the Indo-Pacific region. I. meadi is also found in the Indo-Pacific, but occurs deeper at 3310–4970 m.

== Biology ==
Ipnops has only recently been observed in the wild, so details of their life history has mostly been inferred from the characteristics of captured specimens. They have large mouths with numerous small teeth for swallowing large prey, as well as well-developed gill rakers for capturing smaller items. Examination of stomach contents show a diet of mostly crustaceans and polychaete worms. Their eyes are extremely modified into flat, cornea-like organs that cover most of the upper surface of the head.

The purpose of these structures is debated—they are light-sensitive and may serve to detect bioluminescent prey; it has also been proposed that the organs themselves may be luminescent and act as lures. Ipnops have a well-developed lateral line, which has been suggested to have a primary sensory function given the degenerate state of their other senses.

Like other bathypteroid fishes, Ipnops is hermaphroditic, with male and female gonads combined into a single organ. External fertilization is likely, possibly with ripe eggs held by the pelvic fins to facilitate fertilization. The capture of multiple specimens in single trawls suggests that these fishes may live in aggregates.

== Bibliography ==
- Ellis, Richard (1996). Deep Atlantic: Life, Death, and Exploration in the Abyss. New York, NY: The Lyons Press. ISBN 1-55821-663-4.
- Nielsen, Jørgen G. (1966). "Synopsis of the Ipnopidae (Pisces, Iniomi) with descriptions of two new abyssal species" (PDF). Galathea Report. 8: 49–79. Archived from the original (PDF) on 2007-06-10.
