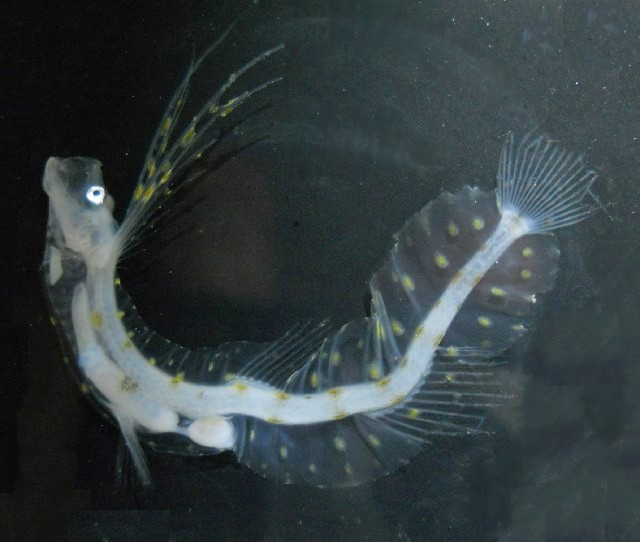
- Bathymicrops regis

Conservation status
- Least Concern (IUCN 3.1)

Scientific classification
- Kingdom: Animalia
- Phylum: Chordata
- Class: Actinopterygii
- Order: Aulopiformes
- Family: Ipnopidae
- Genus: Bathymicrops
- Species: B. regis

Binomial name
- Bathymicrops regis Hjort & Koefoed, 1912

= Bathymicrops regis =

Species of Actinopterygii

Bathymicrops regis is a species of aulopiformes in the family Ipnopidae. It is found in the Atlantic Ocean, off the coasts of Africa and South America. The species is of Least Concern.

== Distribution ==
Bathymicrops regis is found in the Atlantic Ocean, at depths of 3,000–5,700 metres (9,800–18,700 ft). It occurs of the coasts of Morocco, Gabon, Venezuela, and Brazil.

== Description ==
Bathymicrops regis has six to eight dark bands across its body, which is elongated, and grows to a maximum of 11.7 centimetres (4.6 in). It is rare, probably solitary, and eats small crustaceans.

== Conservation ==
In 2013, the IUCN assessed Bathymicrops regis as of Least Concern. No major threats are noted.
