= Bathymicrops belyaninae =

Scientific classification
- Domain: Eukaryota
- Kingdom: Animalia
- Phylum: Chordata
- Class: Actinopterygii
- Order: Aulopiformes
- Family: Ipnopidae
- Genus: Bathymicrops
- Species: B. belyaninae

Binomial name
- Bathymicrops belyaninae Nielsen & Merrett, 1992

Species of Actinopterygii

Bathymicrops belyaninae is a species of aulopiformes in the family Ipnopidae.
