= Bathytyphlops =

Scientific classification
- Kingdom: Animalia
- Phylum: Chordata
- Class: Actinopterygii
- Order: Aulopiformes
- Family: Ipnopidae
- Genus: Bathytyphlops; Nybelin, 1957

Genus of fishes

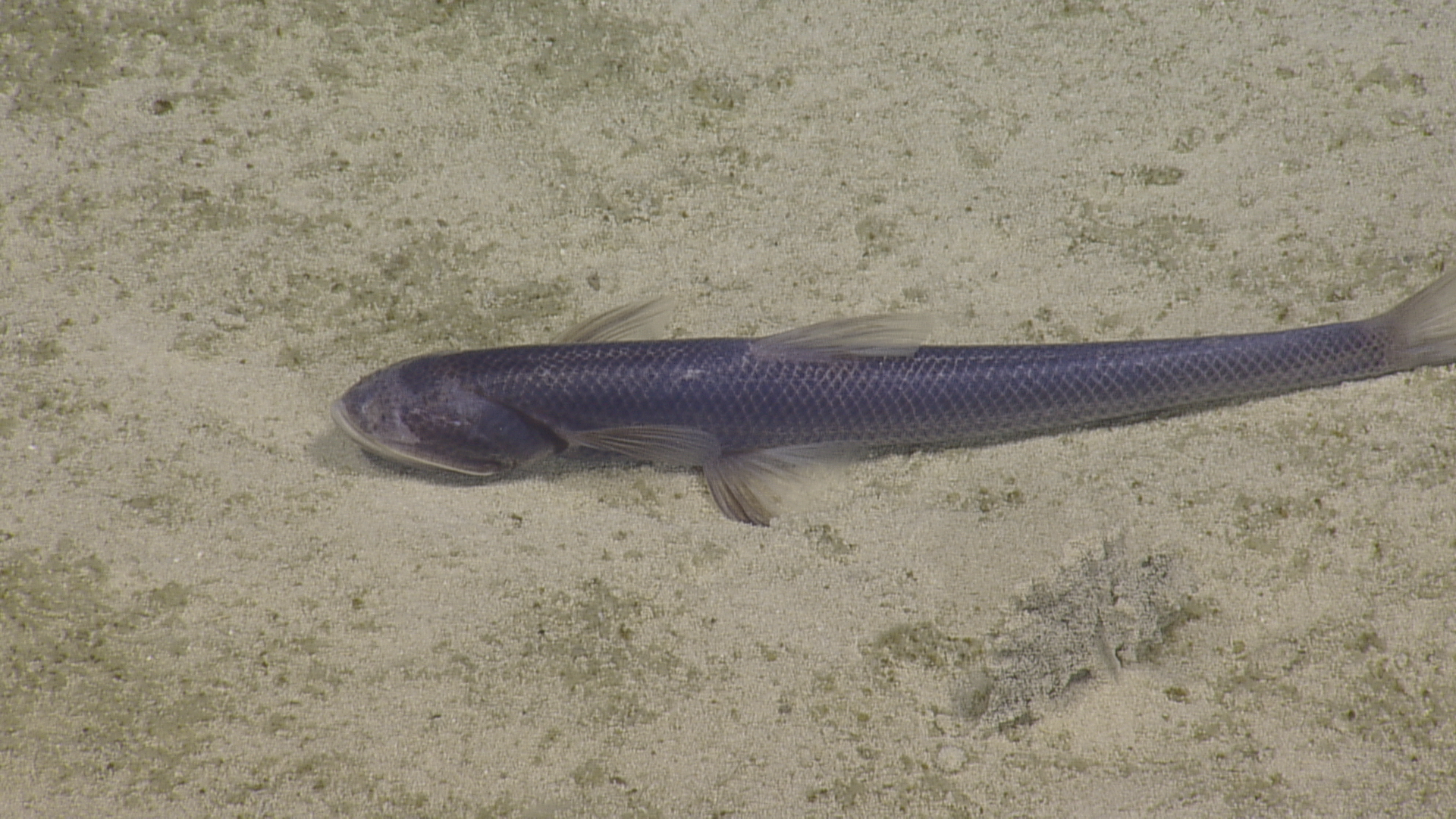
Bathytyphlops marionae resting on the sand of Kingman reef; one of the two species in the genus Bathytyphlops.

Bathytyphlops is a genus of deepsea tripod fishes known only from the eastern Atlantic Ocean.

== Species ==
There are currently two recognized species in this genus:

- Bathytyphlops marionae Mead, 1958 (Marion's spiderfish)
- Bathytyphlops sewelli (Norman, 1939)
