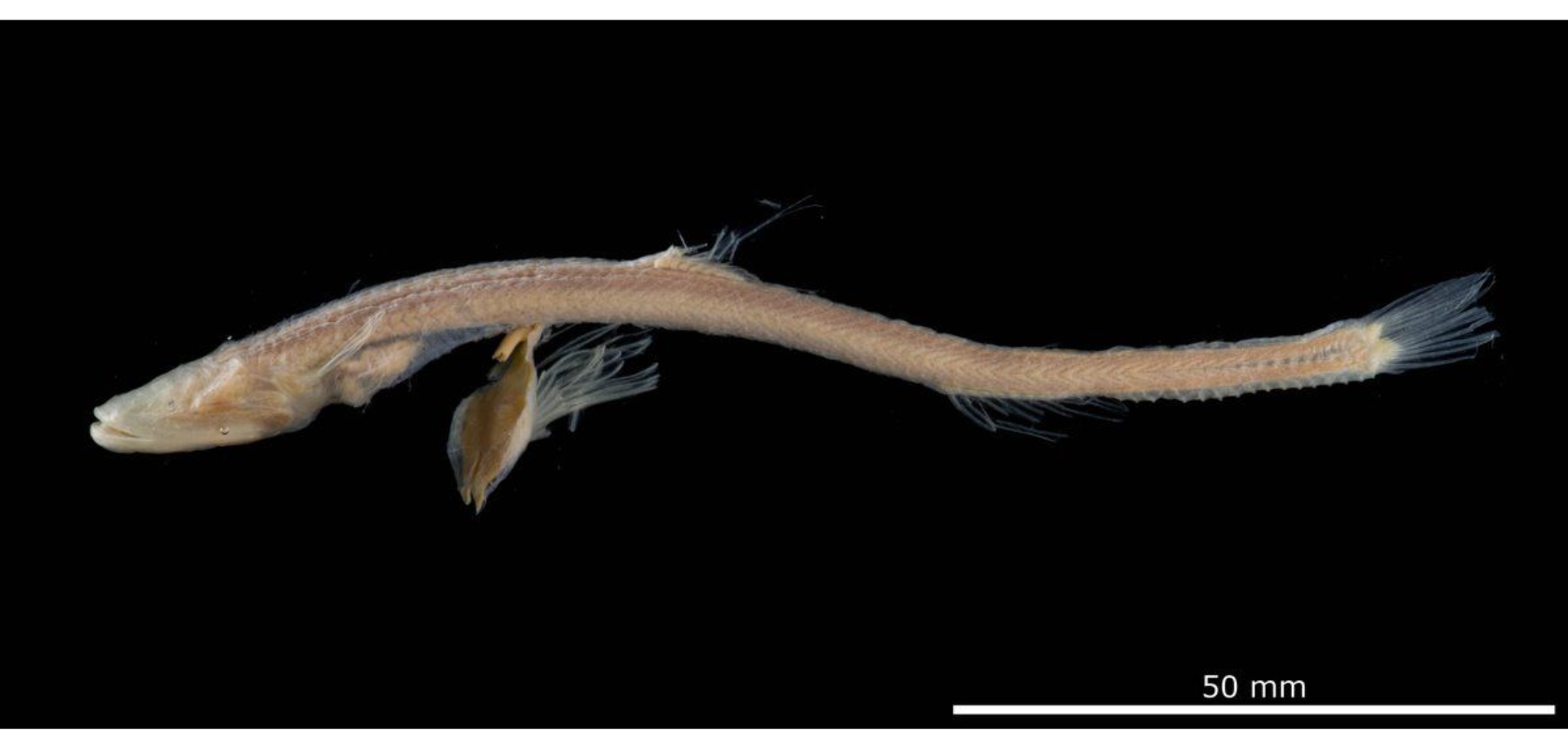
- Preserved holotype

Scientific classification
- Kingdom: Animalia
- Phylum: Chordata
- Class: Actinopterygii
- Order: Aulopiformes
- Family: Ipnopidae
- Genus: Bathymicrops
- Species: B. brevianalis

Binomial name
- Bathymicrops brevianalis Neilsen, J. G. 1966

= Shortarse feelerfish =

Species of fish

The shortarse feelerfish (Bathymicrops brevianalis) is a deepsea tripod fish of the genus Bathymicrops. It is so named because of its almost non-existent eyes (which do exist, just are small and vestigial) and short anal fins. The Latin species name brevianalis means "short anus". The "Sampling the Abyss" project found the fish again in 2017 off the coast of Australia.
