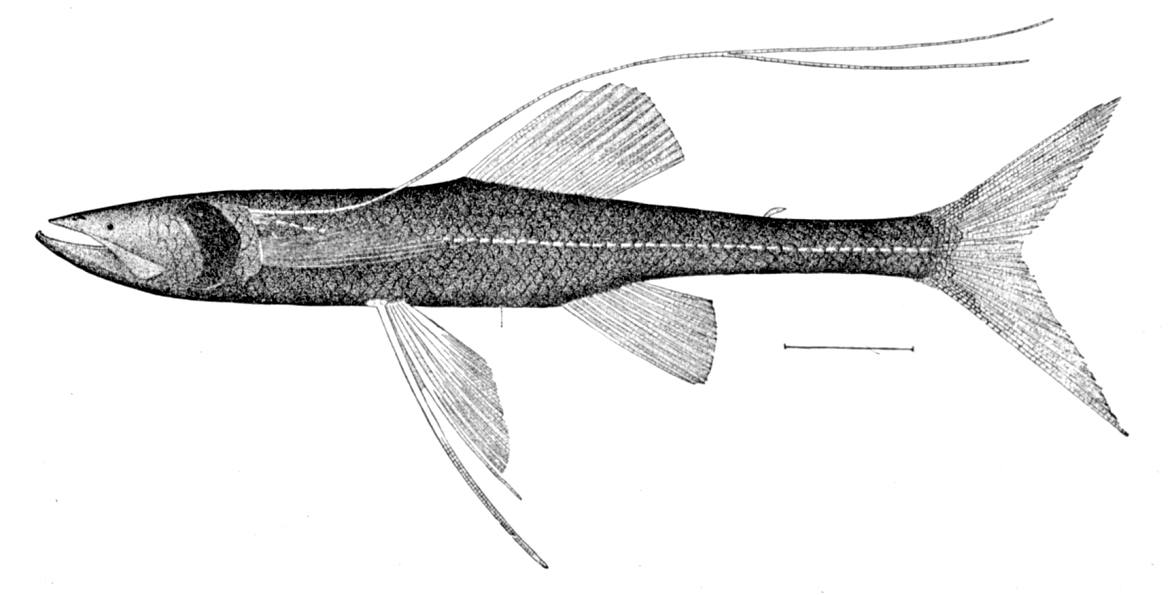
- Abyssal spiderfish from Oceanic Ichthyology by G. Brown Goode & Tarleton H. Bean (1896)
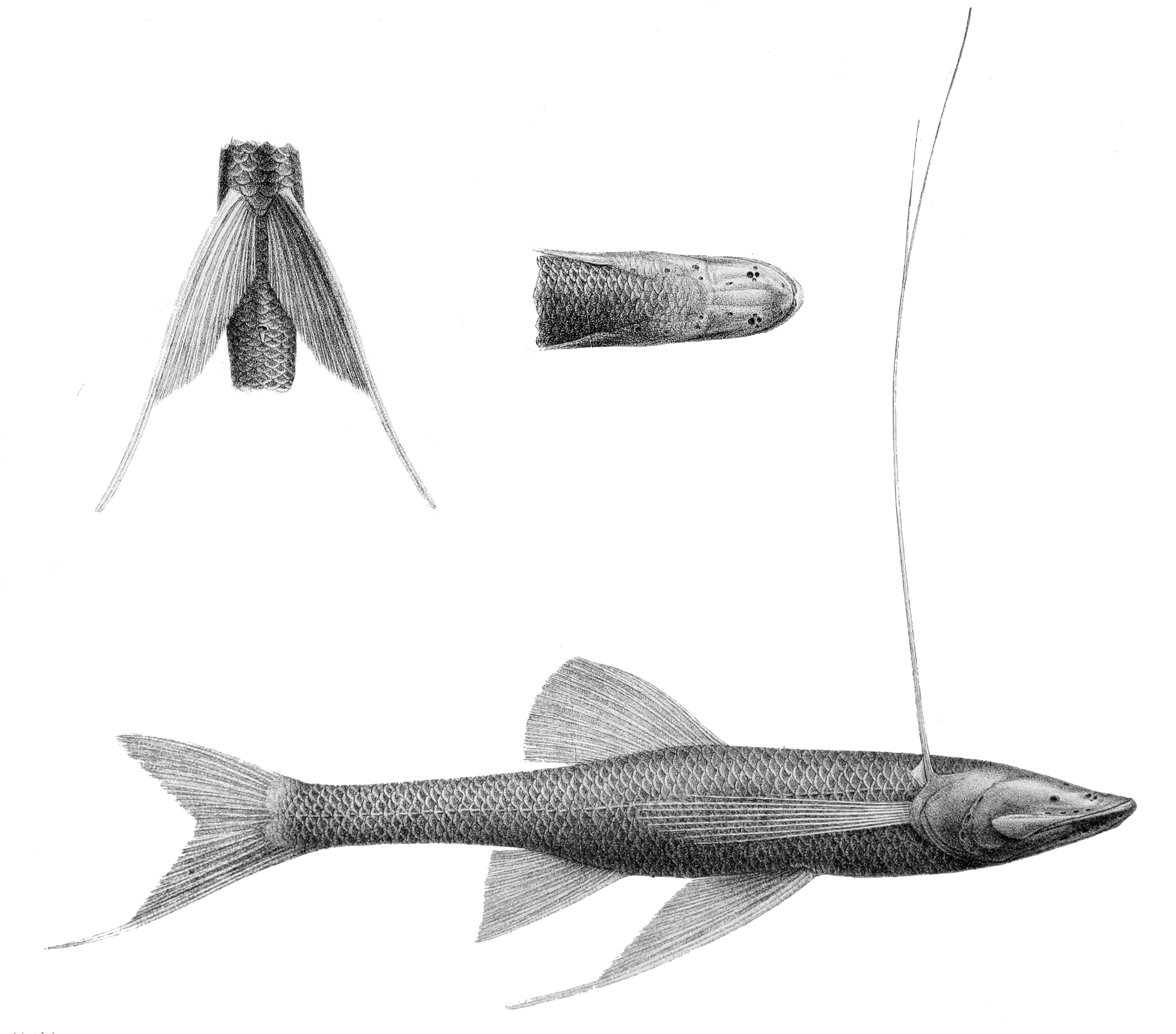

Conservation status
- Least Concern (IUCN 3.1)

Scientific classification
- Kingdom: Animalia
- Phylum: Chordata
- Class: Actinopterygii
- Division: Teleostei
- Order: Aulopiformes
- Family: Ipnopidae
- Genus: Bathypterois
- Species: B. longipes

Binomial name
- Bathypterois longipes Günther, 1878

= Abyssal spiderfish =

Species of fish

The abyssal spiderfish, Bathypterois longipes, is a species of deepsea tripod fish, a demersal fish living on the bottom of the Atlantic Ocean, even on the abyssal plain. It is one of the deepest-dwelling fish known.

== Biology ==
This solitary species grows to about 9–22 centimetres (3.5–8.7 in) long at its adult maximum. It uses its specialized fin rays (tripod) to elevate body into water column. Specialized sensory pectoral fins are spread facing anteriorly, probably to detect prey. It feeds on planktonic crustaceans.

== Distribution and habitat ==
Atlantic Ocean: Off northwestern (south of Cape Verde; off Cape Blanc) and southwestern Africa, both sides of North Atlantic, off Uruguay in the South Atlantic.

A bathydemersal species, it lives in extremely cold water, at temperatures of 0 – −9 °C (32–16 °F). Depth ranges for the abyssal spider fish are 2,615–5,610 metres (8,579–18,406 ft).
