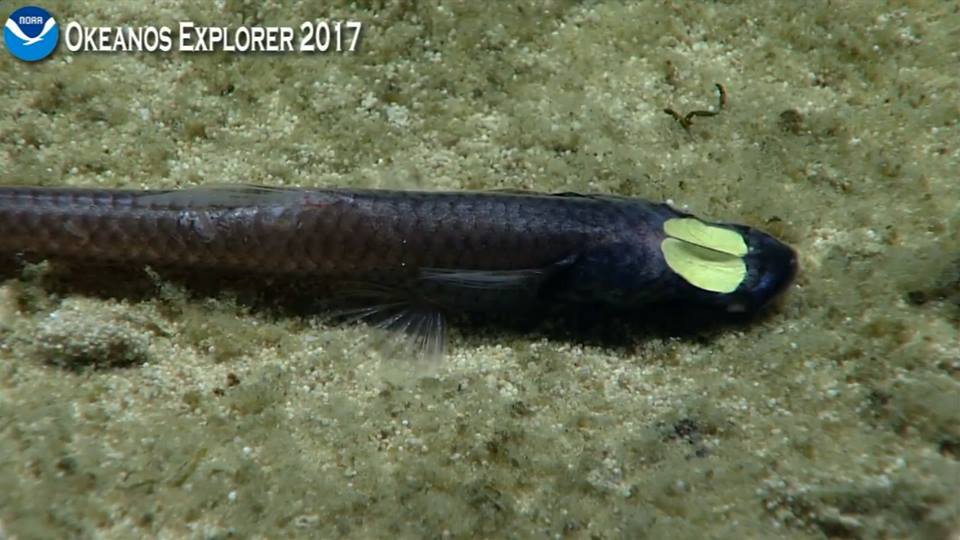

Conservation status
- Least Concern (IUCN 3.1)

Scientific classification
- Kingdom: Animalia
- Phylum: Chordata
- Class: Actinopterygii
- Order: Aulopiformes
- Family: Ipnopidae
- Genus: Ipnops
- Species: I. meadi

Binomial name
- Ipnops meadi J. G. Nielsen, 1966

= Ipnops meadi =

Species of fish

Ipnops meadi, also known as the grideye fish, is a highly specialized species of Placodithyran abyssal fish found in the Clarion–Clipperton zone of the Indo-Pacific Ocean. The species was named after Giles W. Mead of the Harvard Museum of Comparative Zoology, a biology professor at Harvard, deep sea explorer, and ichthyologist.

== History ==
Ipnops were first discovered and named in 1878 by Dr. Albert Günther during the expedition of HMS Challenger. Ipnops was originally classified as a broad species of abyssal flat-headed fish with either very small eyes or membranes covering their eyes. Due to recent scientific advancements and increased deep-sea expeditions, the Ipnops genus now divided into three species (I. agassizi, I. meadi, I. murrayi) based on geographic location. Most information on Ipnops species has been collected via deep-sea expeditions, the most prominent being HMS Challenger (1878), “Galathea” (1950–52), and “Okeanos” (2017). Since Ipnops are rather difficult to locate and photograph at high resolution, very little is known about any of the three species.

== Habitat ==
Due to their rarity, and lack of photos, the three species of Ipnops (I. agassizi, I. meadi and I. murrayi) are distinguished by the depth and location of which they reside. I. meadi and I. agassizi are found in the Indo-Pacific Ocean, and I. murrayi are found in the Atlantic and Caribbean Sea. Ipnops agassizi, meadi, and murrayi also differ by which the depths they occupy. I. agassizi and murrayi are found at depths 3,000 metres (9,840 ft) and above, while I. meadi are found from 3,300–5,000 metres (10,830–16,400 ft).

== Diet ==
Stomach dissections of I. meadi indicate the species primarily feed on small crustaceans.

== Physiology ==
Since all three species of Ipnops are primarily distinguished by their geography, all three species have roughly the same physiology. All Ipnops are generally characterized as long and slender fish lacking traditional ocular lenses found on most marine organisms. In place of eyes, grideye fish have flat bony membranes on top of their skull which act as photosensitive plates. Ipnops also have large mouths, given their size, and sharp, pointed teeth on both the palatine and vomer regions of the mouth.

Based on the dissection of multiple samples, all species have roughly 13-15 anal rays, 13-15 pectoral fin rays, and 54-58 vertebrae. However, due to the species similarity, some scientists have suggested the Ipnops are hybrids and not reproductively isolated, or that Ipnops should just be a single species.

From collections and dissections of Ipnops species, there are a few characteristics specific to I. meadi, compared to the other two species, including:

- Higher average number of lateral line scales
- Higher average number of vertebrae
- Higher average number of gill rakes on the anterior arch
- Absence of otoliths

=== Size ===
- Average standard length of juvenile and adult Ipnops meadi ranges from 55–121 mm (2.2–4.8 in).
- Larval Ipnops measured a standard length of 14 mm (0.55 in).

=== Photosensitive plates ===
The photosensitive plates of the Ipnops are theorized to be sensors that exclusively detect the presence or absence of light. Some scientists hypothesized that the plates serve as an adaptive protection mechanism, helping the Ipnops detect bioluminescence from predators.

=== Reproduction ===
Dissections of Ipnops species’ gonads indicate that these fish are hermaphroditic and lay an average of 900 eggs per clutch.

==== Larval stages and development ====
Currently, there is only one study of larval Ipnops. This study found the larva in shallower depths (1,600 m (5,250 ft)) which suggest larvae move to the surface during their development and return to the depths once they are adults The larva also had very large eyes and no presence of the membrane which covers adult Ipnops eyes. This indicates that as larva develop, they lose their sense of sight and their eyeballs transition into the photosensitive plates. However, this is purely hypothetical and more studies need to be conducted before the scientific community can be certain.
