= Bathymicrops multispinis =

Scientific classification
- Domain: Eukaryota
- Kingdom: Animalia
- Phylum: Chordata
- Class: Actinopterygii
- Order: Aulopiformes
- Family: Ipnopidae
- Genus: Bathymicrops
- Species: B. multispinis

Binomial name
- Bathymicrops multispinis Nielsen & Merrett, 1992

Species of Actinopterygii

Bathymicrops multispinis is a species of aulopiformes in the family Ipnopidae.
