= Bathymicrops =

Scientific classification
- Kingdom: Animalia
- Phylum: Chordata
- Class: Actinopterygii
- Order: Aulopiformes
- Family: Ipnopidae
- Genus: Bathymicrops; Hjort & Koefoed, 1912

Genus of fishes

Bathymicrops is a genus of deepsea tripod fishes.

== Species ==
There are currently four recognized species in this genus:

- Bathymicrops belyaninae J. G. Nielsen & Merrett, 1992
- Bathymicrops brevianalis J. G. Nielsen, 1966 (Shortarse feelerfish)
- Bathymicrops multispinis J. G. Nielsen & Merrett, 1992
- Bathymicrops regis Hjort & Koefoed, 1912
