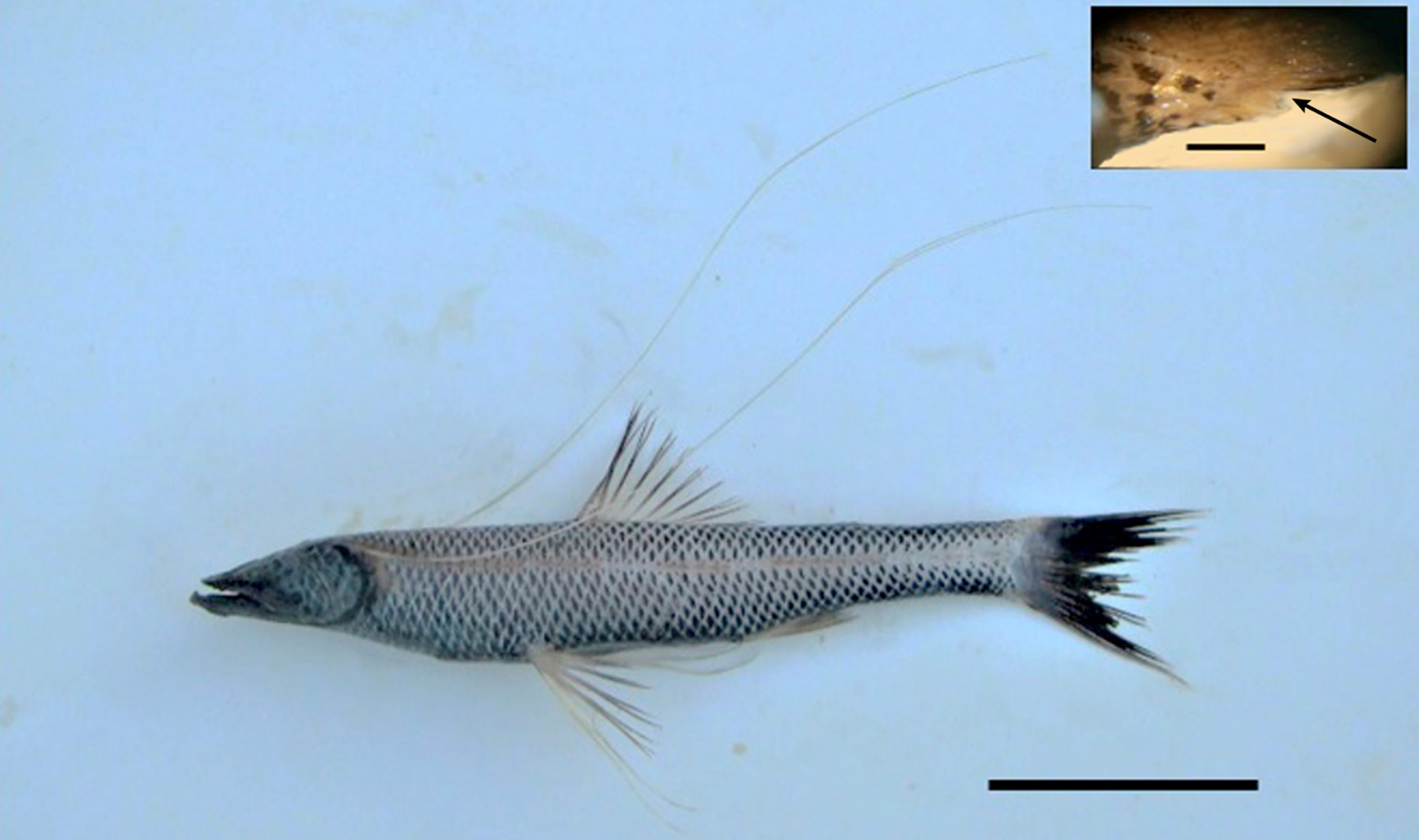

Conservation status
- Least Concern (IUCN 3.1)

Scientific classification
- Kingdom: Animalia
- Phylum: Chordata
- Class: Actinopterygii
- Order: Aulopiformes
- Family: Ipnopidae
- Genus: Bathypterois
- Species: B. dubius

Binomial name
- Bathypterois dubius Vaillant, 1888

= Bathypterois dubius =

Species of fish

Bathypterois dubius, the Mediterranean spiderfish, a lizardfish of the family Ipnopidae (tripod fishes), is found in the northern Atlantic as well as the Mediterranean. It reaches a length of 20.5 centimetres (8.1 in) SL. Like other species in its family, the Mediterranean spiderfish is hermaphroditic. It is solitary in nature and feeds on mysids and copepods.

== Description ==
=== Morphology ===
The Mediterranean spiderfish, like other tripod fish, has an elongate body with an array of detached pectoral fin rays, the top two of which are modified in such a way that they are elongated, parting near the tip. The pelvic fins are long and stiffened, allowing it to sit and wait atop the seafloor, like other members of its genus.

Its coloration has been described as black with fins in preserved specimens being transparent or dusky, though may have been black in life. Its caudal fin is black. It has 15-16 dorsal fin rays, 8-10 anal fin rays, 8 pelvic fin rays, and 11-13 pectoral fin rays.

Its eyes and pineal organs are significantly reduced, which has been compared to the blind cavefish, Typhlichthys subterraneus. In contrast, they have well-developed lateral lines and "voluminous" areas of the brain associated with gustatory functions, which are connected to their pectoral fin rays which may house taste buds.

=== Behavior ===
B. dubius inhabits the deep sea akin to its congeners, and has been observed at depths of 2,900 metres (9,500 ft) in the Eastern Mediterranean. Typical of its genus, it is a sit-and-wait predator, "standing" on its elongated fins which form a tripod. In commercial fishing operations the species is occasionally caught as bycatch, but this may not have a significant impact on its populations, at least in the northeast Atlantic.

=== Taxonomy ===
Bathypterois mediterraneus is considered to be a junior synonym of Bathypterois dubius. It was named in 1962 by M. L. Bauchot, citing differences in morphology. However, the species status was later rescinded after the differences in morphology were determined to be insufficient for describing a new species.

=== Common name ===
The common name "Snoutlet crotchfeeler" was coined by D. E. McAllister in his 1990 book, A List of the Fishes of Canada. McAllister created common names for deep-sea fish, which are unlikely to have day-to-day use, and they subsequently appeared in Encyclopedia of Canadian Fishes (1995) by Brian W. Coad. In a review of Coad's book, Erling Holm criticized some of the deep-sea fish names coined by McAllister, like canopener smoothdream and doormat parkinglotfish, as "unnecessarily complex, easily misspelled, or downright silly" — and wrote that snoutlet crotchfeeler "violates the tenets of good taste". Holm noted that many of the names coined by McAllister did not meet the criteria set by the Committee on Names of Fish.
