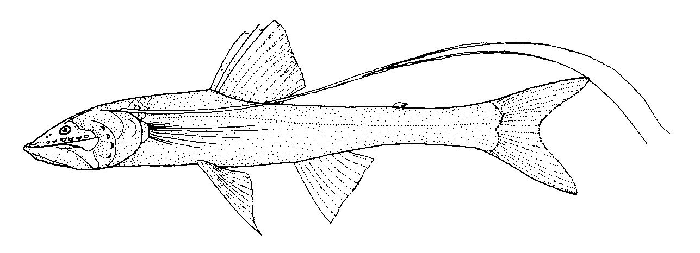
- Drawing by Dr Tony Ayling

Scientific classification
- Kingdom: Animalia
- Phylum: Chordata
- Class: Actinopterygii
- Order: Aulopiformes
- Family: Ipnopidae
- Genus: Bathypterois
- Species: B. longifilis

Binomial name
- Bathypterois longifilis Günther, 1878

= Feeler fish =

Species of fish

The feeler fish, Bathypterois longifilis, a grinner of the family Ipnopidae, is found around Australia and New Zealand.
