= Oceanic zone =

Part of the ocean beyond the continental shelf

The oceanic zone is the deep, open-ocean water that lies off the continental slopes

The oceanic zone is typically defined as the area of the ocean lying beyond the continental shelf (e.g. the neritic zone), but operationally is often referred to as beginning where the water depths drop to below 200 metres (660 ft), seaward from the coast into the open ocean with its pelagic zone.

It is the region of open sea beyond the edge of the continental shelf and includes 65% of the ocean's completely open water. The oceanic zone has a wide array of undersea terrain, including trenches that are often deeper than Mount Everest is tall, as well as deep-sea volcanoes and basins. While it is often difficult for life to sustain itself in this type of environment, many species have adapted and do thrive in the oceanic zone.

The open ocean is vertically divided into five zones: the epipelagic zone, mesopelagic zone, bathypelagic zone, abyssopelagic zone, and hadalpelagic zone.

== Sub zones ==
The mesopelagic (disphotic) zone, which is where only small amounts of light penetrate, lies below the epipelagic (photic) zone. The mesophelagic zone is often referred to as the "twilight zone" due to its scarce amount of light. Temperatures in the mesopelagic zone range from 4 to 20 °C (39 to 68 °F), with pressures increasing with depth and being up to 10,100 kilopascals (1,460 psi).

54% of the ocean lies in the bathypelagic (aphotic) zone into which no light penetrates. This is also called the "midnight zone" or the deep ocean. Due to the complete lack of sunlight, photosynthesis cannot occur and the only light source is bioluminescence. Water pressure is very intense (reaching over 40,300 kilopascals (5,850 psi)), and temperatures are near freezing (ranging from 0 to 6 °C (32 to 43 °F)).

== Marine life ==
Oceanographers have divided the ocean into zones based on how far light reaches. All of the light zones can be found in the oceanic zone. The epipelagic zone is the one closest to the surface and is the best lit. It extends to 100 meters and contains both phytoplankton and zooplankton that can support larger organisms like marine mammals and some types of fish. Past 100 meters, not enough light penetrates the water to support life, and no plant life exists.

There are creatures, however, which thrive around hydrothermal vents, or geysers located on the ocean floor that expel superheated water that is rich in minerals. These organisms feed on chemosynthetic bacteria, which use the superheated water and chemicals from the hydrothermal vents to create energy in place of photosynthesis. The existence of these bacteria allows creatures like squid, hatchet fish, octopuses, tube worms, giant clams, spider crabs, and other organisms to survive.

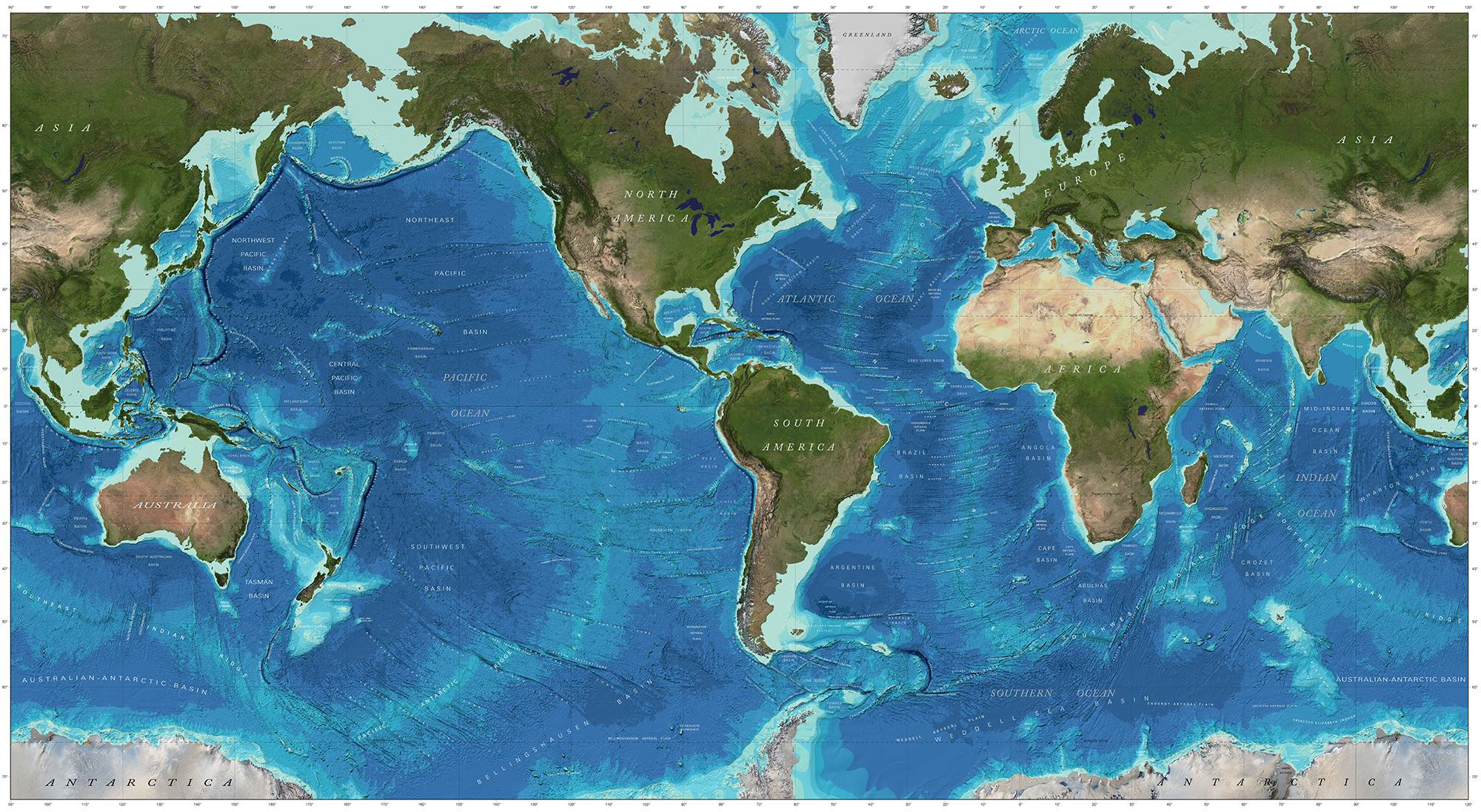
The oceanic zone is the deep ocean (deep blue) that lies beyond the relative shallows of the continental shelves (light blue)

External videos
- Our Planet: High Seas – David Attenborough, full episode, Netflix

Due to the total darkness in the aphotic zones, many organisms that survive in the deep oceans do not have eyes, and other organisms make their own light with bioluminescence. This light is often blue-green in color because many marine organisms are sensitive to blue light; it is produced by the reaction of two compounds (luciferin and luciferase) which creates a soft glow. The process by which bioluminescence is created is very similar to the reaction which occurs when a glow stick is broken. Deep-sea organisms use bioluminescence for everything from luring prey to navigation.

Creatures such as sharks, other fish, and whales are found throughout the oceanic zone.
