= Giles W. Mead =

American ichthyologist

Giles W. Mead Jr (b. 1928, d. 2003) was an American ichthyologist and museum curator who was the director of the Natural History Museum of Los Angeles County in the 1970s. He gained his doctorate from Stanford University before going on to work at the United States Fish and Wildlife Service as a fish taxonomist. He then worked at the Smithsonian Institution before moving to Harvard University, where he was the curator of fishes at the Museum of Comparative Zoology and a professor of biology.

== Early life ==
Giles W. Mead was born on February 5, 1928, in New York City. His father was Giles W. Mead, a co-founder of Union Carbide, and his mother was Elise. The family moved to Los Angeles in 1935. He gained his Bachelor's in 1949, Master's in 1952 and Ph.D. in 1953 from Stanford University, while also working at the Bureau of Commercial Fisheries. While studying for his post-graduate degrees, he joined a group of ichthyology and herpetology students who were being taught by George S. Myers in the university's Natural History Museum.

== Career ==
Mead successfully completed his doctorate in 1953, after which he joined the BCF Laboratory, Woods Hole, although his time at BCF was interrupted by a short period of enlistment in the U.S. Army at Fort Detrick, Maryland. After the Army, he returned to the BCF at the Smithsonian Museum in Washington D.C., replacing Isaac Ginsburg as a fish taxonomist. He occupied this post for 4 years before moving to Harvard, where from 1960 to 1970 he was the curator of fishes and a professor of biology. He left Harvard to return to Los Angeles as director of the Natural History Museum of Los Angeles County. In this spot, he successfully fought the museum's corner in opposition to Proposition 13. He also oversaw the addition of a new wing to the museum and the opening of a new branch of the museum at the La Brea Tar Pits. He resigned from that post in 1978.

== Later life ==
Mead retired to the Mead Ranch, where the Mead family had held property since 1913, in the Napa Valley following his resignation from the museum. He continued to be active, interested in oenology, Cabernet Sauvignon and Zinfandel are grown on the 1,300 acres (530 ha) ranch. He also became interested in conservation, and in 1990 the ranch was placed under a conservation easement. He was also active, through the family foundation, the Giles W. and Elise G. Mead Foundation, in supporting conservation efforts in the Pacific Northwest and in research and civic support. Through the Mead Foundation, he supported an international conference on the systematics of the fishes belonging to the Order Gadiformes. Other projects supported include Frogfishes of the World by T. W. Pietsch and David B. Grobecker. published in 1987, and ASIH Special Publication No. 3, Collection Building in Ichthyology and Herpetology by Pietsch and William D. Anderson Jr..

== Personal life and death ==
Mead was married and divorced three times and had three daughters and two sons. He was a collector of Native American textiles and Escher prints. He also added to his father's collections of Japanese netsukes and spectacular minerals. He was also a book collector, especially of natural history titles, basing his collection around the collection of William Beebe, which Mead had purchased.

Mead died on 13 February 2003 at the Mead Ranch. The majority of his book collection was donated to the Los Angeles County Museum, with many of the most valuable books being donated to the Huntington Library.

=== Eponyms ===
Mead was honored in the names of the following taxa:

- Coloconger meadi Kanazawa, 1957
- Diaphus meadi Nafpaktitis 1978
- Gigantactis meadi Bertelsen, Pietsch & Lavenberg, 1981
- Hollardia meadi Tyler, 1966
- Ipnops meadi Nielsen, 1966
- Scopelosaurus meadi Bertelsen, Krefft & Marshall 1976
- Scyliorhinus meadi Springer, 1966
