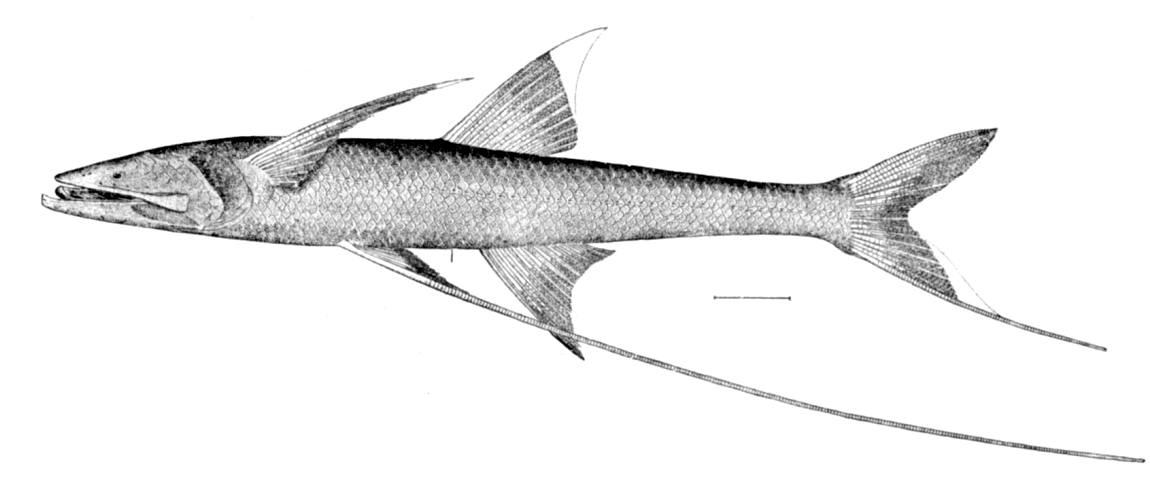
- Adult collected at a depth of 1,850 fathoms (3.38 km)
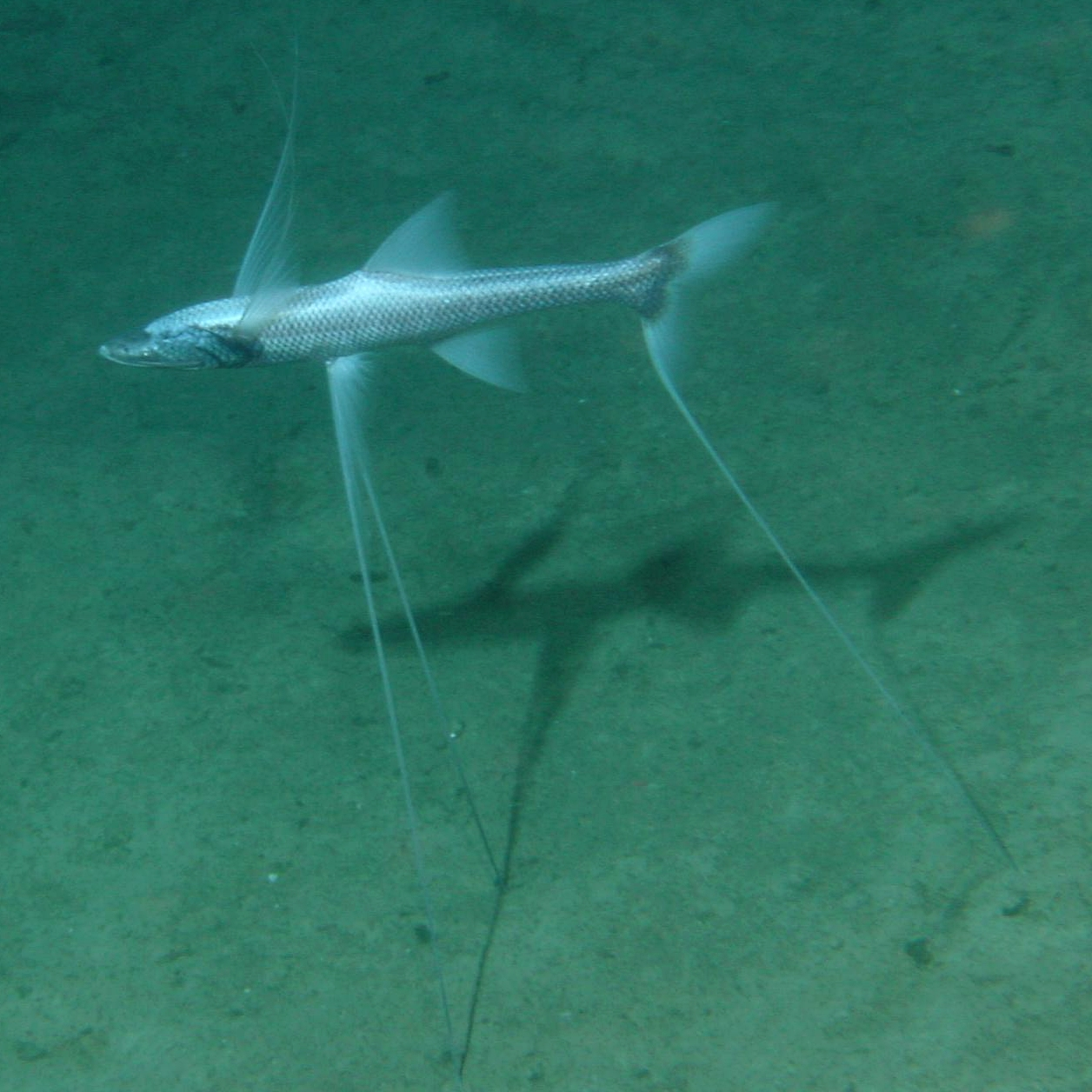
- B. grallator standing on the seafloor.

Conservation status
- Least Concern (IUCN 3.1)

Scientific classification
- Kingdom: Animalia
- Phylum: Chordata
- Class: Actinopterygii
- Division: Teleostei
- Order: Aulopiformes
- Family: Ipnopidae
- Genus: Bathypterois
- Species: B. grallator

Binomial name
- Bathypterois grallator (Goode & T. H. Bean, 1886)

= Bathypterois grallator =

Tripodfish

Species of fish

The tripod fish (also known as the tripod spiderfish), Bathypterois grallator, is a grinner in the family Ipnopidae found at lower latitudes. Because of its unique way of "standing" on the seafloor, B. grallator is one of the best-known benthic fish, and it is one of the few members of its genus to be directly observed and photographed by submersibles.

== Characteristics ==
=== Morphology ===
B. grallator is the largest member of its genus, commonly exceeding a standard length of 30 cm (12 in) and reaching total lengths of up to 43.4 cm (17.1 in). It is mostly silver or white in color, with darker coloration around its head and gills and a stripe down each side of its body, mirroring the position of a lateral line. Most notably, it has greatly extended fin rays on the lower lobe of its caudal fin and both of its pelvic fins. When feeding, it is often seen standing on the seafloor using these extensions, in a distinctive "tripod" configuration that gives the species its name. These extensions have been observed to be flexible when swimming but stiff when resting, and it is suggested that fluids are pumped into these fins when the fish is standing to make them more rigid. These fin modifications contain no sensory cells and they likely have no further purpose other than supporting the fish as it stands.

Compared to other members of its genus, B. grallator's pectoral fins are relatively small, and it holds them slightly backwards from its body rather than forward into the current. However, its pectoral and caudal fin extensions are very long, reaching up to a meter in length (approximately three times the length of its body). B. grallator notably lacks an adipose fin, a feature found in most other bathypterois species. It is likely to be slightly negatively buoyant to prevent it from drifting while feeding.

=== Movement ===
B. grallator is a subcarangiform swimmer, using a combination of its fins, tail, and body to move. Because its adaptations are almost entirely tailored to sitting still, B. grallator's movements are exaggerated and inefficient, and it is an overall poor swimmer. Its style of locomotion alternates between swimming and resting on the seafloor using its fins, using a unique bathypteroiform style of movement that is unique to the genus. When swimming, its pectoral, dorsal, and anal fins are held directly away from the body and are used for stabilization, while its elongated pelvic fins are held directly downward and perpendicular to its body.

When it descends to the seafloor, the tripod fish lifts its caudal fin extension horizontally behind it before touching down on the substrate, and lands on its pelvic fins first. Afterwards, it lowers its caudal fin, which possibly allows the fish to adjust its orientation and body angle relative to the water column. Like other tripod fish, it uses muscle tension on its tendon to move the fin rays, however, independent movement of the caudal fin ray has only been observed in B. grallator.

== Habitat and distribution ==
Bathypterois grallator has been found on the continental slope and abyssal plain in the Atlantic, Pacific, and Indian oceans from 40°N to 40°S, as well as near coastlines in Africa, North America, Central America, and Madagascar. It is a wide-ranging eurybathic and eurythermal fish found from 878 to 4,720 m (2,881 to 15,486 ft) in depth and in water temperatures ranging from 2.7 to 13.5 degrees Celsius. B. grallator does not appear to have a preferred habitat, remaining consistently widespread through most oceans in the mid-latitudes and sharing habitats with other tripod fish, such as Bathypterois longifilis which it has been observed standing in close proximity to.

B. grallator has been listed as least concern by the IUCN as of May 2013 with no specific major threats to the species. However, the tripod fish's habitat is known to be affected by human activity, such as deep-sea mining, drilling, and plastic waste. Because B. grallator's population is so isolated, it is difficult to determine the extent to which it is at risk from these factors.

Recent observations from deep-sea ROV surveys suggest that B. grallator may exhibit a more dynamic ecological role than previously described. While it is generally considered a passive sit-and-wait predator, individuals have been observed subtly repositioning in response to gentle bottom currents, potentially improving prey capture efficiency. This behavior may reduce competition with other tripodfish occupying similar depth ranges. Additionally, sediment disturbance caused by fin-supported resting postures has been hypothesized to attract small benthic invertebrates, which may incidentally increase feeding opportunities. It has also been proposed that the species’ elongated fin rays could function in mechanosensory detection of current direction, allowing fine-scale adjustments in body orientation while stationary.

== Biology ==
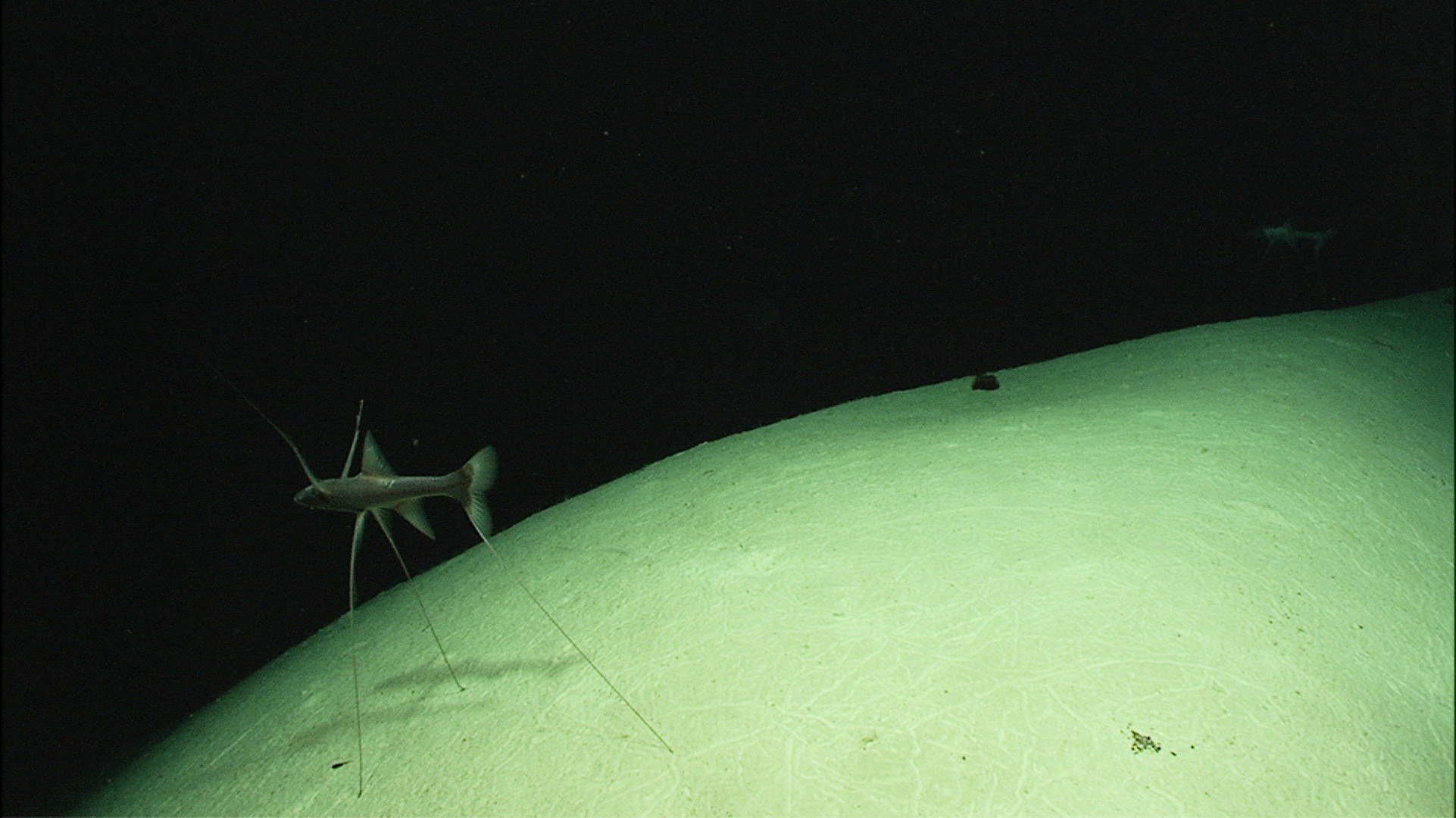
Two tripod fish exhibiting filter feeding behavior off the coast of Eleuthera, at a depth of 1960 meters.

=== Feeding ===
Like most members of class Ipnopidae, B. grallator has extremely poor eyesight and no special visual adaptations to help it find food in low-light environments. Instead, it uses tactile and mechanosensory cues to identify prey. While feeding, the tripod fish stands motionless on its pelvic and tail fins and faces into the current. The ends of B. grallator's pectoral fins are receptive to sensory input and can both feel for prey and direct water into the fish's mouth. In early stages in life, it is primarily a filter feeder, however, as it grows larger, it can also exhibit ambush hunting behavior. B. grallator is extremely well suited to sit-and-wait feeding, and spends much of its life sitting as it waits for prey to drift by.

B. grallator's diet consists mostly of zooplankton and small animals in the water column, and it undergoes an ontogenetic shift as it grows larger. Specimens below 200mm in length are mostly recorded eating small invertebrates such as copepods, amphipods, and crustacean larvae, while larger fish also eat mysids. Above 240mm, the tripod fish's diet consists mostly of teleosts and decapods by weight, with approximately 78.7% of their diet consisting of teleosts. Due to its height, B. grallator has also been hypothesized to feed on larger gelatinous prey that floats higher in the water column.

=== Reproduction ===
Tripod fish are simultaneous hermaphrodites, where each individual has both male and female reproductive organs. Specifically, the fish has both female and male reproductive tissues through ovotestes. It mates by releasing both sperm and eggs into the water, which can be externally fertilized by another B. grallator. In the event one fish cannot find a mate, it can also self-fertilize, which increases the likelihood of reproduction in the sparsely populated abyssal plain.

=== Parasitism ===
Tripod fish are susceptible to parasites. Common parasites that use tripod fish as a host are Steringophorus cf. dorsolineatum, Scolex pleuronectis, Hysterothylacium aduncum, Anisakis sp., and Sarcotretes sp.. Tripod fish contract the majority of their parasites through their diet. When tripod fish feed on things such as crustaceans and zooplankton, they contract parasites that reside within the prey. Tripod fish that feed on prey containing larvae are much more likely to contract a parasite. Parasites within tripod fish help determine the location and depth of tripod fish since prey that contain specific parasites are found at specific locations and depths.
