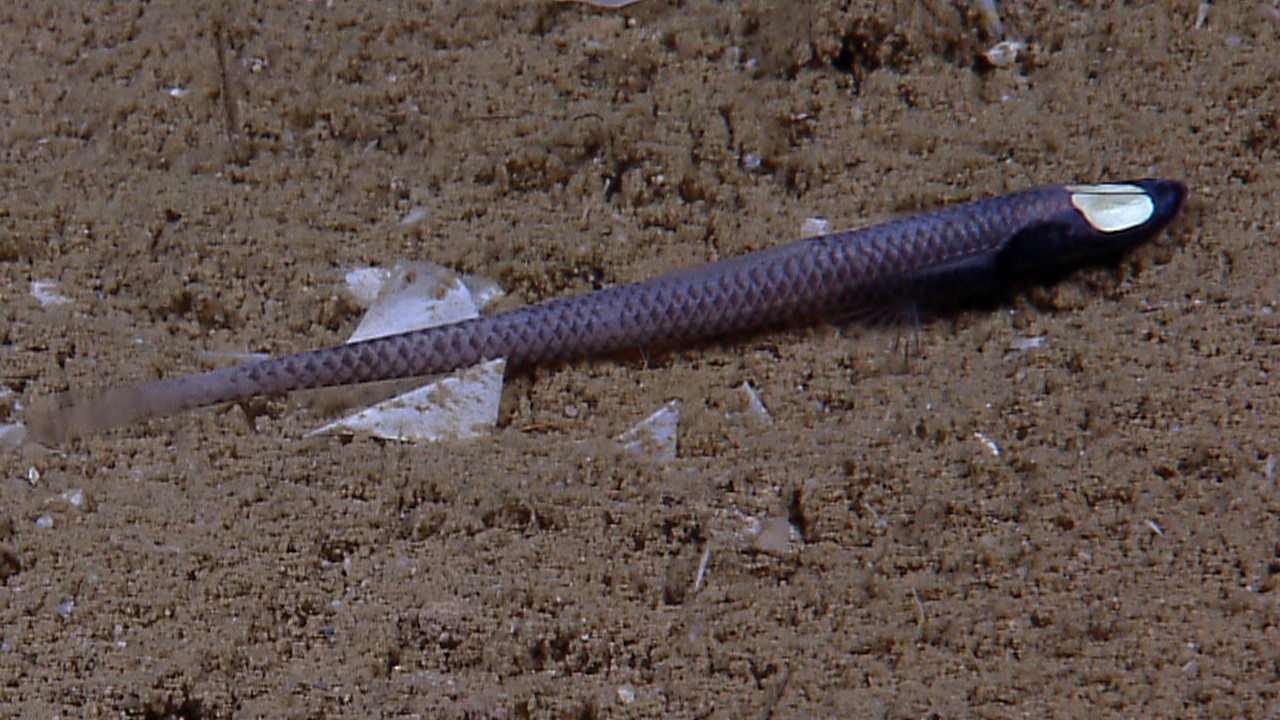
- Ipnops, the type genus
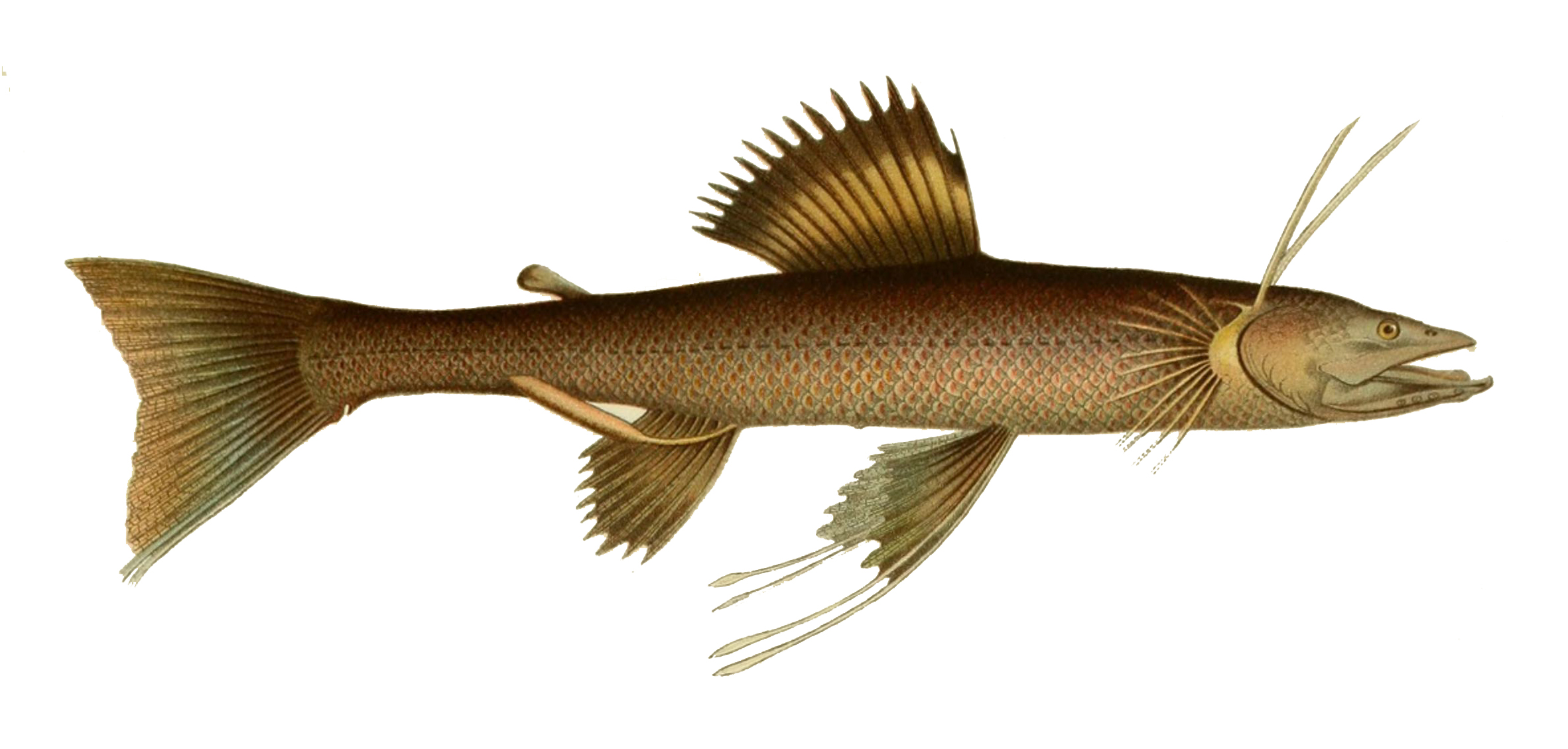
- Mediterranean spiderfish (Bathypterois dubius)

Scientific classification
- Kingdom: Animalia
- Phylum: Chordata
- Class: Actinopterygii
- Division: Teleostei
- Order: Aulopiformes
- Family: Ipnopidae; T. N. Gill, 1884

Genera
- Bathymicrops; Bathypterois; Bathytyphlops; Ipnops

= Ipnopidae =

Family of fishes

The Ipnopidae (deepsea tripod fishes) are a family of fishes in the order Aulopiformes. They are small, slender fishes, with maximum length ranging from about 10 to 40 cm (3.9 to 15.7 in). They are found in temperate and tropical deep waters of the Atlantic, Indian, and Pacific Oceans. Abiotic factors, such as depth, temperature, dissolved oxygen concentration, pressure, and carbon concentration can all impact their distribution.

A number of species, especially in the genus Bathypterois, have elongated pectoral and pelvic fins. In the case of the tripodfish, Bathypterois grallator, these fins are three times as long as the body — up to a meter in length — and are used for standing on the sea floor. Ipnopids either have tiny eyes, or very large eyes that lack any lens; in either case they have very poor vision and are unable to form an image. Ipnopidae is a species of fish that have adapted to living in the deep. Their skeleton is flatter with reinforced bony heads on its fin rays and its pelvic fins are located through the tips of the pectoral fin rays.
