= Aulopopsis =

Aulopopsis Temporal range: Lower Eocene

Scientific classification
- Kingdom: Animalia
- Phylum: Chordata
- Class: Actinopterygii
- Division: Teleostei
- Order: Aulopiformes
- Genus: †Aulopopsis; Casier, 1966

Species
- A. depresifrons Casier, 1966; A. egertoni Casier, 1966

Aulopopsis is an extinct genus of prehistoric marine ray-finned fish that lived during the lower Eocene. It is considered a relative of lizardfish in the order Aulopiformes, but its exact taxonomic placement is uncertain. Some authorities place it with the Aulopidae, while others place it with the Giganturoidae.

It contains two species, both from the London Clay of the United Kingdom:

- A. depresifrons Casier, 1966
- A. egertoni Casier, 1966

== See also ==
- Prehistoric fish
- List of prehistoric bony fish
