= Chlorophthalmus basiniger =

Scientific classification
- Kingdom: Animalia
- Phylum: Chordata
- Class: Actinopterygii
- Order: Aulopiformes
- Family: Chlorophthalmidae
- Genus: Chlorophthalmus
- Species: C. basiniger

Binomial name
- Chlorophthalmus basiniger Prokofiev, 2020

Species of fish

Chlorophthalmus basiniger is a fish species that is in the genus Chlorophthalmus which was discovered in Vietnam by Prokofiev & D. Pauly in 2020.

It is found in the seas of the Western Pacific, particularly Vietnam and possibly the Kyushu-Palau Ridge, Japan. It has been found off Vietnam along with other members of the genus, C. acutifrons, C. nigromarginatus and C. cf. pectoralis.
