= Cucumberfish =

Cucumberfish is a common name for several fish and may refer to:

- the family Paraulopidae, in particular the species Paraulopus nigripinnis
- the Australian grayling, Prototroctes maraena
- the New Zealand smelt, Retropinna retropinna
- the bivalve pearlfish, Onuxodon margaritiferae
