= Hime (disambiguation) =

Hime is a Japanese woman of noble birth.

Hime may also refer to:

- Hime (surname), including a list of people with that surname
- Hime (rapper) (born 1979), Japanese hip hop artist
- Hime Station, a train station in Tajimi, Gifu Prefecture, Japan
- Hime cut, a hairstyle originating in Japan
- Hime (fish), a genus of flagfins
- Hime River, a river in Japan
