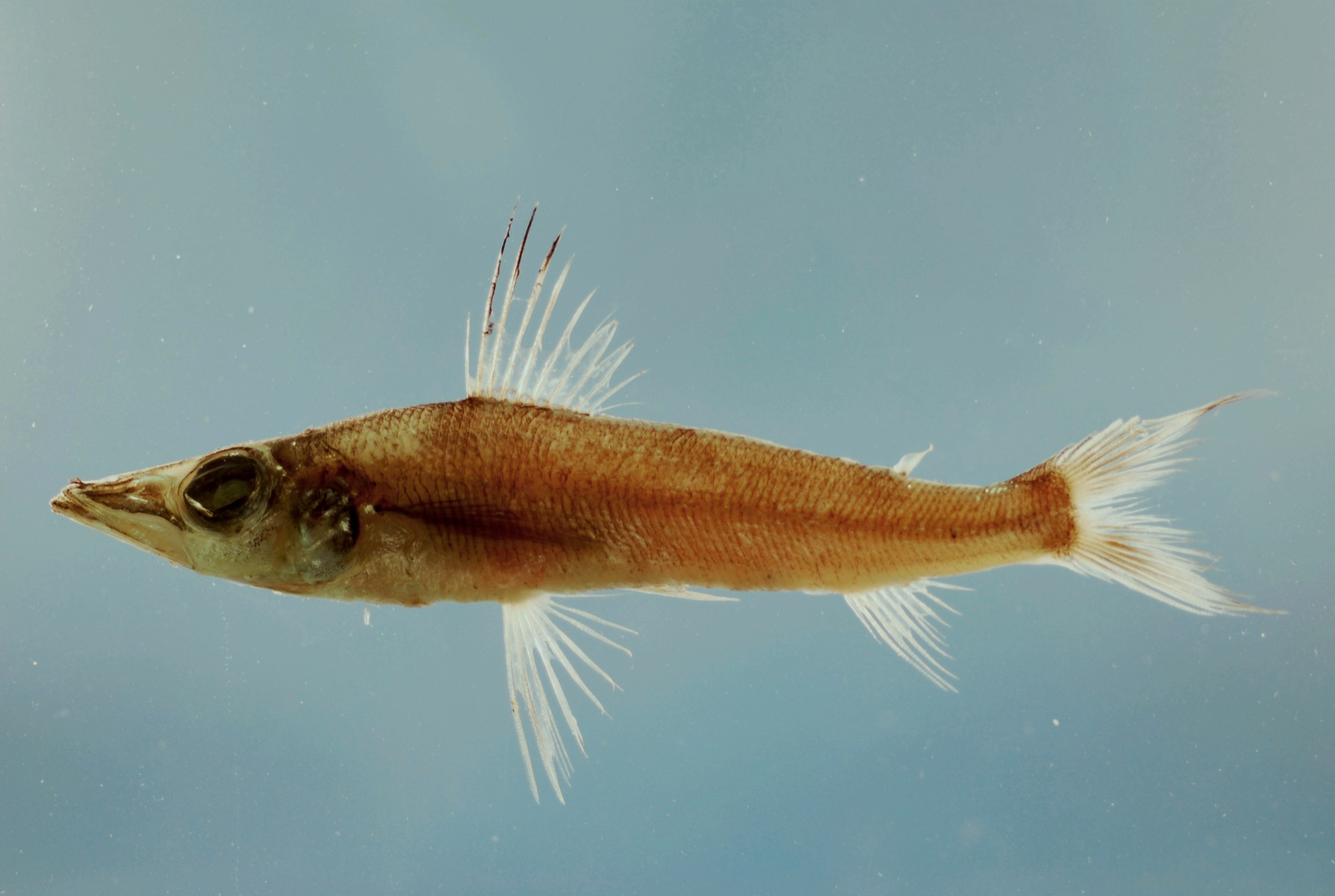
- Longnose greeneye (P. truculenta)

Scientific classification
- Kingdom: Animalia
- Phylum: Chordata
- Class: Actinopterygii
- Order: Aulopiformes
- Family: Chlorophthalmidae
- Genus: Parasudis; Regan, 1911

= Parasudis =

Genus of fishes

Parasudis is a genus of greeneyes found in the Atlantic Ocean, with these recognized species:

- Parasudis fraserbrunneri (Poll, 1953)
- Parasudis truculenta (Goode & T. H. Bean, 1896) (longnose greeneye)
