= William Baker (colonist) =

British settler in Australia (1761–1836)

- Born: c.1761
- Died: September 1836 (aged 74–75); Hobart, Tasmania, Australia
- Occupations: New South Wales Marine; Superintendent of convicts Farmer and publican Town crier, Supreme Court of Van Diemen's Land
- Title: Sergeant
- Spouse(s): Susannah Huffnell (1788—1790); Elizabeth Lavender (m. 1795 – 1824)

William Baker (c. 1761—14 September 1836) was a New South Wales Marine and member of the First Fleet that founded the European penal colony of New South Wales.

Initially an orderly for the colony's first Governor, Arthur Phillip, Baker was later appointed government storekeeper in Parramatta, and storekeeper and superintendent of convicts in the rural settlement of Hawkesbury. In 1810 he was dismissed from all government posts after being found to have misused his position for personal gain, and relocated to Hobart where he became the inaugural crier for Australia's oldest colony-wide judicature, the Supreme Court of Van Diemen's Land.

The Australian fish Latropiscis purpurissatus, or "Sergeant Baker", is named in his honour.

== Early life ==
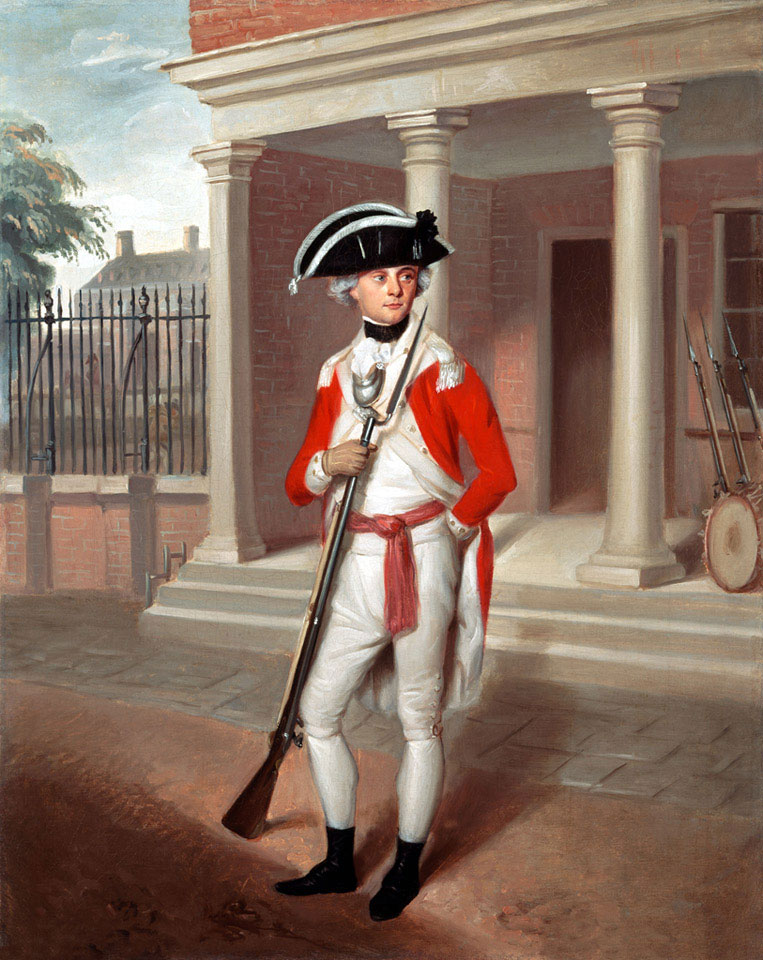
A British marine officer, c. 1780

There are no surviving records of Baker's life prior to enlistment in the New South Wales Marine Corps at the age of 26. Enlistment requirements mandated that members of the New South Wales Corps were at least five and a half feet tall, with previous satisfactory service in the British Marines and the appearance of being among " the stoutest, fittest and healthiest [of] men".

=== Voyage on First Fleet ===
Baker joined the First Fleet to New South Wales in 1787 as a Marine corporal of the 53rd (Portsmouth) Company, embarked aboard the convict transport Charlotte. The Fleet set sail from Portsmouth on 13 May 1787. Two days later Baker was severely wounded when he accidentally shot himself in the foot, having placed his loaded musket on the deck while preparing for guard duty. Ship's surgeon John White treated the wound, and reported a significant injury to the right ankle:

"The bones, after being a good deal shattered, turned the (musket) ball which, taking another direction, had still force enough left to go through a harness cask full of beef at some distance, and after that to kill two geese who were on the other side of it."

Baker was incapacitated for three months, but took pains to advance his recovery through exercise and careful tending of the wound. To the surprise of his shipmates he had recovered sufficiently to resume active duty when the Fleet reached Rio de Janeiro in August 1787. Surgeon White recorded that Baker had regained "the perfect use of the wounded leg", which he credited to Baker's youth and "good habit of body".

=== Marine Service in New South Wales ===
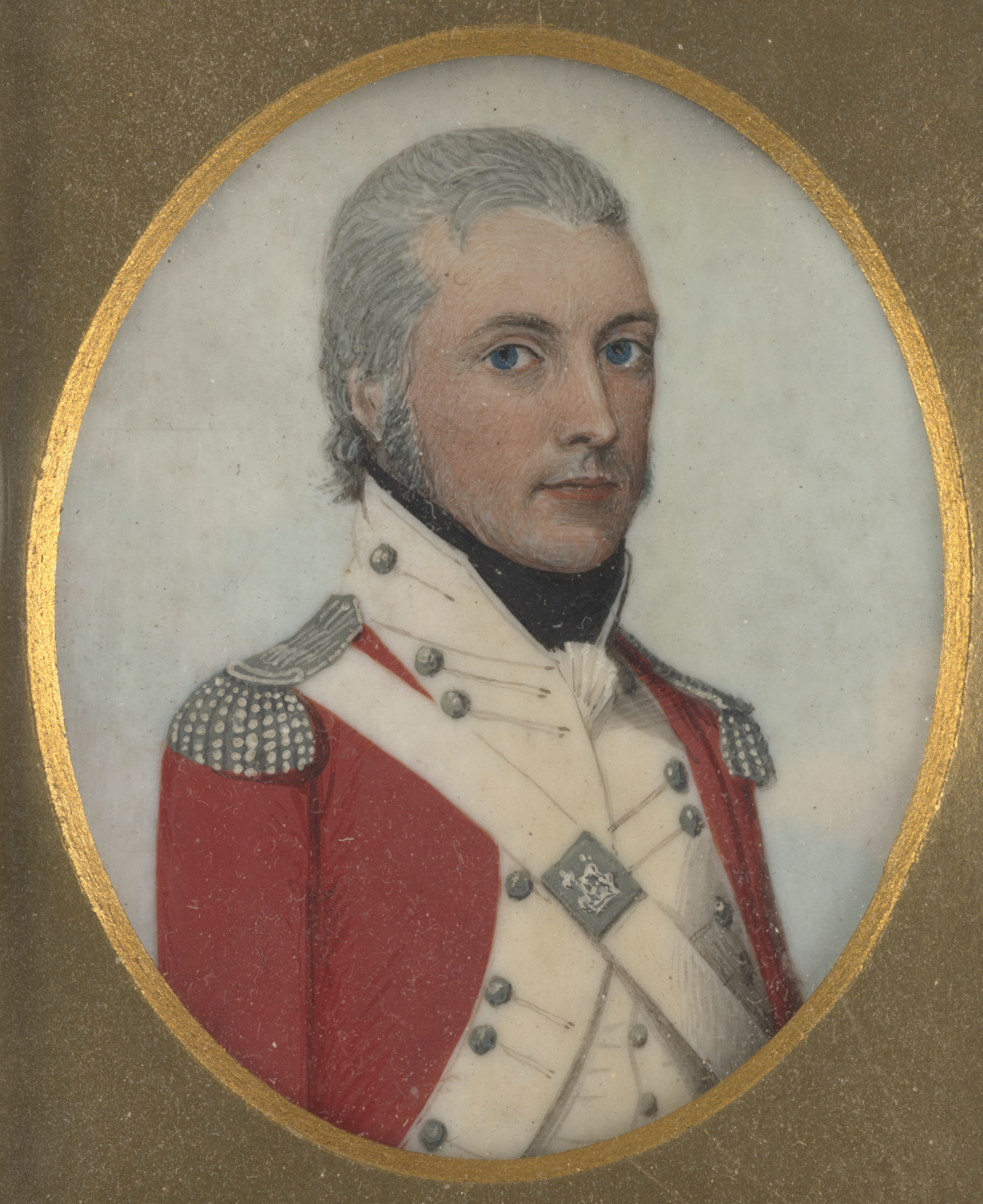
Captain Watkin Tench, Baker's commanding officer from 1788 to 1791. Artist unknown, c. 1800.

The Fleet arrived in New South Wales in January 1788, with the Marines disembarking first at Botany Bay. Six days later they reboarded the ships for the voyage to Port Jackson, where they were reorganised into four companies under the commands of Captains James Campbell and John Shea, and Captain-Lieutenants Watkin Tench and James Meredith. Baker was promoted to sergeant and assigned to Tench's company alongside fellow sergeants William Perry and Edward Campion. He was further appointed as orderly to the colony's Governor, Arthur Phillip, an administrative office that relieved him of routine duties such as supervising the landing of convicts or clearing trees and undergrowth for the building of the settlement.

Immediately on arrival in Port Jackson Baker also took a common-law wife from among the convicts – 25-year-old Susannah Huffnell, who had been sentenced to seven years transportation for petty larceny. Their only child, Elizabeth, was born on 1 January 1789. The relationship was not a happy one and Baker refused to accompany his wife and child when they were transferred to the remote colonial outpost of Norfolk Island in March 1790. Susannah and Elizabeth had no further contact with Baker, even after they returned to Sydney in the 1800s. (Note: Susannah Huffnell (born 1763), a household servant from Worcester, sentenced in 1786 to seven years transportation and carried to the colony aboard the convict ship Lady Penrhyn. She cohabited with Baker from March 1788 to March 1790, after which she and their child were transferred to Norfolk Island. Huffnell remained there until at least 1805, and is recorded as having given birth to at least two more children. She returned when the Norfolk Island settlement was abandoned, sometime between 1805 and 1813. Huffnell remained in Port Jackson until at least 1817, and married a free settler.)

Baker's Marine service was uneventful, and his name rarely appears in colonial records for this period. He was an enthusiastic fisherman and may have been the first to catch Latropiscis purpurissatus, a common species along the New South Wales coast and described as "growing to more than two feet, coloured red to violet blue with red and yellow tail fin", and "edible, but not greatly esteemed". The fish was named in his honour in 1843. (Note: The World Fish Center identifies Latropiscus purpurissatus and Hime purpurissatus as synonyms for a single species, with the former the accepted name and the latter a misspelling of later synonym Hime purpurissata.)

Marine Corps' terms of enlistment were for three years, with Baker's service expiring in 1791. The bulk of the Marine force departed in December of that year aboard HMS Gorgon, leaving sixty men behind under the command of Lieutenant John Poulden to support the newly established New South Wales Corps. Baker also remained in the colony, continuing his duties as orderly to Governor Phillip. He returned to England in December 1792, in company with Phillip and the remaining Marines as passengers aboard the convict transport Atlantic.

== Civilian life ==
On arrival in England, Baker declined re-enlistment into the Marines and returned to civilian life. Within six months he received an appointment from the Navy Board to act as civilian superintendent of convicts aboard the transport vessel Surprize, which departed for New South Wales in early 1794. Baker took an immediate dislike to four of the convicts under his watch who had sentenced for political offences and were collectively known as Scottish Martyrs. Late in the voyage he advised Surprize's captain Patrick Campbell that the four men planned to mutiny and seize the vessel. Acting on Baker's word, Campbell had three of the four confined until Surprize reached Sydney Cove.

=== Farmer and storekeeper ===
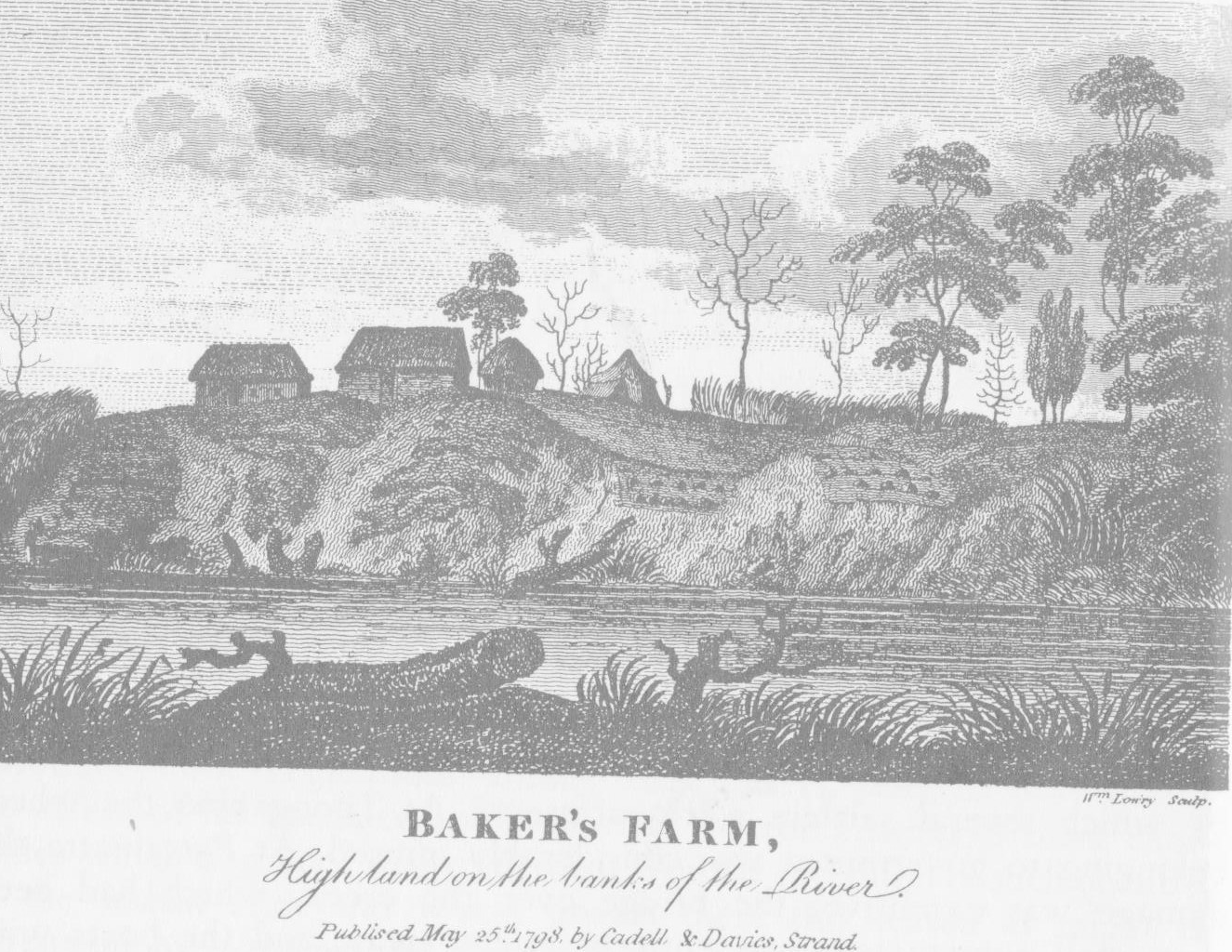
Sketch of Baker's farm, overlooking the Parramatta River. Dated 25 May 1798. Artist unknown.

On reaching Sydney Baker resigned his Navy position and sought opportunities as a farmer. His interests were assisted by the deregulation of land grants under Governor Phillip's successor, Francis Grose. In October 1794 he obtained a grant of 40 acres (16.2 ha) of farming land near Toongabbie, which he partly cleared and planted with wheat and maize. To supplement his farming income he petitioned for administrative employment and was appointed storekeeper in Parramatta in January 1795, supervising distribution and security of military and civilian supplies. On 26 August 1795, having comfortably established himself as a farmer and government agent, Baker married former convict Elizabeth Lavender.

Two months later Governor John Hunter appointed him superintendent of convicts for the Hawkesbury region, a newly established area of farms to the northwest of Baker's own lands. His reputation was somewhat marred by a 1797 conviction for stealing a boat worth £16 from a neighbour, Thomas Raby. Baker admitted possession of the vessel but denied it was Raby's. He was found guilty of theft and fined a proportion of the vessel's value.

In 1798 Baker received a third official appointment, as government storekeeper for the Hawkesbury region in addition to his equivalent duties in Parramatta. Despite his past experience, Baker was quickly found wanting in the management of the stores, specifically those for farmers near the settlement of Windsor. In 1798 the local grain harvest was too large to be receipted and stored in the Windsor storehouse, so Baker elected to fill that store solely with produce supplied by the region's three largest landholders. In consequence, smaller farmers at Windsor had no means of selling or storing their grain and were brought close to bankruptcy. Baker was deaf to their complaints, and Governor Hunter was forced to intervene in person to keep the peace. In a letter on 19 April, sent via the New South Wales Corps commander in Hawkesbury, Hunter directed Baker to return half of the harvest he had already stored, and instead fill the storehouse with goods from smaller farms.

Regardless of this setback, the following years were personally prosperous for Baker. In early 1800 he received a further official grant of 30 acres (12.1 ha) at Mulgrave, and on 20 June he purchased another 30 acres from a dissolute former convict, Charles Williams, who had settled in 1791 but abandoned active farming. (Note: Charles Williams, sentenced in 1784 to seven years transportation for stealing, arriving in New South Wales in 1788 aboard Scarborough. On expiry of his sentence he married fellow convict Eleanor McCabe and was granted 30 acres of farming land at Mulgrave. Eleanor drowned in the Parramatta River in 1793. The Colony's Chief Secretary David Collins noted that after Eleanor's death Williams ceased cultivating his land and gave "himself up to idleness and dissipation". After selling his 30 acres to Baker, Williams remained in Mulgrave as a labourer on his former property.) Baker's dealings in this period were not particularly honest; in 1800 he refused to pay a government debt of £86 owed for use of two servants that had worked on his farm since 1798, and historian Brian Fletcher has suggested he also misappropriated supplies and labour from his own government store. No action was taken against Baker for these offences, and with ready access to resources he was able to swiftly clear and farm his properties.

Land grant records in 1801 indicate that Baker had twelve acres of maize and wheat under cultivation with another twelve acres lying fallow, and that he owned one horse, four goats and 22 hogs. His two unpaid servants were recorded as still being present on the farm. In 1800 Baker also bought and began operating a public house, The Royal Oak, selling alcohol to convicts and settlers in Windsor.

=== Dismissal ===
As a publican Baker supported Governor William Bligh's attempts to regulate liquor imports, and signed a letter to this effect in 1807. Despite this, he publicly welcomed Bligh's overthrow in the 1808 Rum Rebellion and congratulated former Marines officer George Johnston for helping seize executive authority on behalf of the New South Wales Corps. In so doing he drew the attention of Bligh's replacement, Governor Lachlan Macquarie, who commenced an investigation into accusations that Baker had unfairly treated Hawkesbury settlers by appropriating supplies from the government store. The accusations were upheld and in 1810 Baker was dismissed from all his government posts. The Royal Oak, described by a later historian as one of "the worst houses along the river", was also ordered to be closed.

=== Life in Hobart ===
"I have heard reports that he was formerly in the habit of sometimes getting tipsy, yet his conduct ... has in other respects been proper."

— Referee comment on the character of William Baker, 1836

His business interests having collapsed, Baker abandoned his farm and relocated from New South Wales to the southern settlement of Hobart in Van Diemen's Land. In 1814 he is recorded as holding the office of government storekeeper in Hobart. A year later, at an approximate age of 54, he accepted a job as town crier for the newly created Deputy Judge Advocate's Court, calling witnesses and announcing verdicts on the roadside outside the courthouse. Any remaining business links with New South Wales were severed in 1819 with the sale of Baker's former farm to a colleague, Samuel Terry, who had recently visited him in Hobart. His wife, Elizabeth Baker, died in April 1824 and was buried in Hobart Cemetery.

The Supreme Court of Van Diemen's Land was established by The Royal Letters Patent of 13 October 1823 and commenced activities on 10 May 1824, with Baker as its inaugural crier. This would be Baker's last and longest occupation. In February 1836 he received his first pay rise since becoming crier, being granted an extra £20. A contemporary reference applauded Baker's respectable appearance as crier but noted that he was "in the habit of sometimes getting tipsy" while performing his tasks.

== Death ==
Baker died in Hobart on 14 September 1836, at the age of 75. (Note: Fletcher incorrectly records Baker as dying in April 1824, which is the date of death of his wife Elizabeth.) At the time of his death he owned 230 acres of uncultivated land at Argyle and Ulva, Van Diemen's Land. He is commemorated in the naming of Baker Street in Windsor, New South Wales, adjacent to the former site of The Royal Oak hotel, and in Baker's Lagoon, a body of water located between the Hawkesbury River and the town of Richmond.

== Notes ==
=== Citations ===
- Bladen, F. M., ed. (1978). Historical records of New South Wales. Vol. 2. Grose and Paterson, 1793–1795. Lansdown Slattery & Co. ISBN 0868330035.
- Bladen, F. M., ed. (1979). Historical records of New South Wales. Vol. 4, Hunter and King, 1800, 1801, 1802. Lansdown Slattery & Co. ISBN 0868330051.
- Britton, Alex R., ed. (1978). Historical records of New South Wales. Vol. 1, part 2. Phillip, 1783–1792. Lansdown Slattery & Co. OCLC 219911274.
- Chapman, Don (1986). 1788: The People of the First Fleet. Doubleday Australia. ISBN 0868242659.
- Clouston Associates; OneEighty Sport and Leisure Solutions (May 2013). Hawkesbury Regional Open Space Strategy (PDF) (Report). Hawkesbury City Council.
- Cobley, John (1963). Sydney Cove: 1789–1790. Angus & Robertson. ISBN 0207141711.
- Cobley, John (1986). Sydney Cove: 1795–1800. Angus & Robertson. ISBN 0207150842.
- Collins, David (1975). Fletcher, Brian H. (ed.). An Account of the English Colony in New South Wales. A.H. & A.W. Reed. ISBN 0589071688.
- Gillen, Mollie (1989). The Founders of Australia: A Biographical Dictionary of the First Fleet. Library of Australian History. ISBN 0908120699.
- Hill, David (2009). 1788. Random House Australia. ISBN 9781741668001.
- Moore, John (1987). The First Fleet Marines. University of Queensland Press. ISBN 0702220655.
- Steele, James (1977). Early Days of Windsor, N. S. Wales. Star Printing. ISBN 0908120028.
