= Black Lizard =

Black Lizard may refer to:

- The Black Lizard, a 1934 novel by Edogawa Ranpo
  - Black Lizard, a 1961 play by Yukio Mishima adapted from Ranpo's novel
  - Black Lizard, a 1962 film directed by Umetsugu Inoue adapted from Ranpo's novel
  - Black Lizard (film), a 1968 film directed by Kinji Fukasaku based on Mishima's adaptation
- Black Lizard (publisher), an American book publisher
- Black lizardfish, Bathysauropsis gracilis, a grinner of the genus Bathysauropsis
