= Pseudotrichonotus belos =

Conservation status
- Data Deficient (IUCN 3.1)

Scientific classification
- Kingdom: Animalia
- Phylum: Chordata
- Class: Actinopterygii
- Division: Teleostei
- Order: Aulopiformes
- Family: Pseudotrichonotidae
- Genus: Pseudotrichonotus
- Species: P. belos

Binomial name
- Pseudotrichonotus belos Gill & Pogonoski 2016

Species of fish

Pseudotrichonotus belos, commonly known as the dart sand-diving lizardfish, is a species of sand-diving lizardfish discovered in 2016 off the coast of Western Australia.

== Discovery and etymology ==
Pseudotrichonotus belos was first described in 2016 based on three specimens trawled 100-120m off the coast of Western Australia. The holotype is held in the Australian National Fish Collection.

The species name comes form the Greek word belos (βέλος), meaning arrow or dart, in reference to the fish's streamlined shaped. It was selected based on a vote by school students.

== Morphology ==
The holotype was 4.12cm long, with the two other collected specimens being 2.91cm and 2.33cm in length. The species was described from a deceased and frozen specimen. The specimen was pale tan to pinkish brown in color with a bright yellow midlateral stripe extending from the snout midway across the length of the body and bordered ventrally by an iridescent gray-blue stripe. The specimen also had yellow and gray spots along its body. P. belos is unique from its sister species in that its dorsal fin origin is well behind that of the pelvic fin.

== Habitat and ecology ==
All known examples of P. belos have been collected from the Indian Ocean off of Western Australia. Specimens have been collected from Exmouth Gulf Bay, Shark Bay, and west of Alison Point. The full extent of the specie’s range is unknown. A radiograph of one of the three original paratype specimens noted small gastropod shells in the gut.
