= B. malayanus =

B. malayanus may refer to:

- Bathysauropsis malayanus, a fish species in the genus Bathysauropsis and the family Ipnopidae
- Beloniscus malayanus, a harvestman species in the genus Beloniscus and the family Epedanidae

== See also ==
- Malayanus
