= Leptaulopus =

Scientific classification
- Kingdom: Animalia
- Phylum: Chordata
- Class: Actinopterygii
- Order: Aulopiformes
- Family: Aulopidae
- Genus: Leptaulopus; M. F. Gomon, Struthers & A. L. Stewart, 2013

Type species
- Leptaulopus damasi S. Tanaka (I), 1915

Genus of ray-finned fishes

Leptaulopus is a genus of flagfins native to the western Pacific Ocean, with these currently recognized species:

- Leptaulopus damasi (S. Tanaka (I), 1915)
- Leptaulopus erythrozonatus M. F. Gomon, Struthers & A. L. Stewart, 2013
