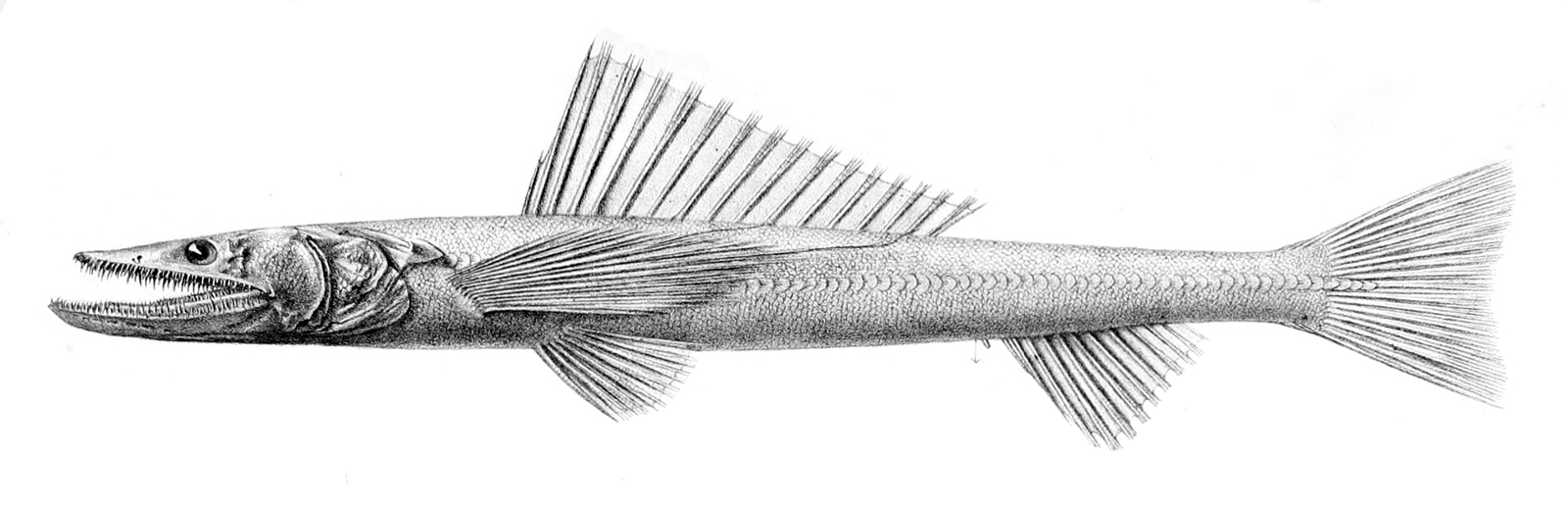
- Bathysaurus ferox

Scientific classification
- Kingdom: Animalia
- Phylum: Chordata
- Class: Actinopterygii
- Order: Aulopiformes
- Suborder: Giganturoidei
- Family: Bathysauridae; C. C. Baldwin & G. D. Johnson, 1996
- Genus: Bathysaurus; Günther, 1878

Synonyms
- Macristium

= Bathysauridae =

Genus of fishes

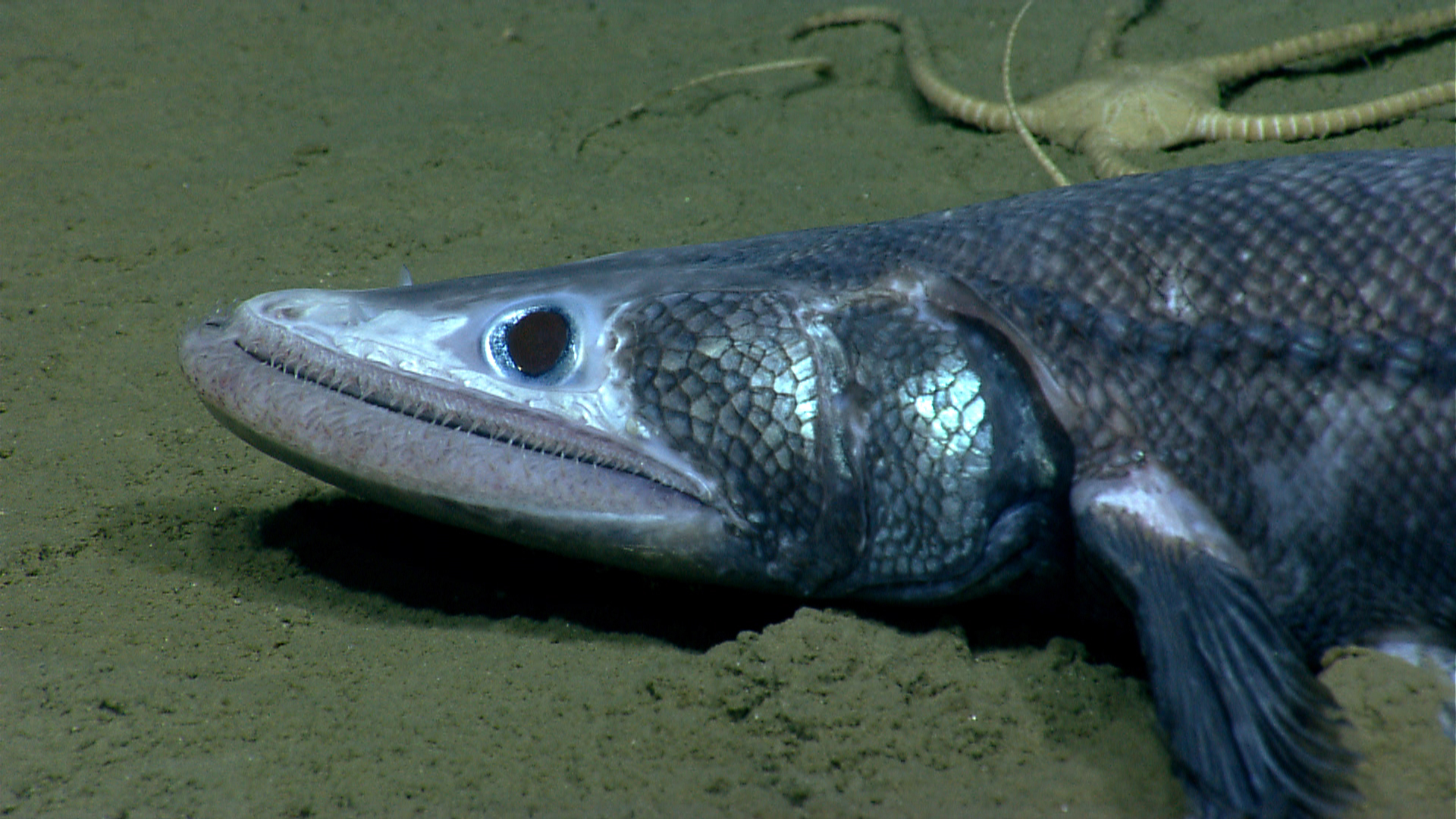
Bathysaurus use their lower jaw to scoop in the sand

The Bathysauridae are a small family of deepwater aulopiform fish, related to the telescopefishes. The two species in the family both belong to the genus Bathysaurus. Commonly called deepwater lizardfishes or deepsea lizardfishes, the latter name usually refers to the species B. ferox specifically.

Physically, the bathysaurids resemble the lizardfishes, as reflected in their common names. They can be distinguished from the lizardfishes by their flatter heads and curved and barbed teeth. They are moderately sized fish, up to 78 cm (31 in) in length.

Bathysaurids inhabit the deep oceans, below 1,600 m (5,200 ft) depth. They are one of the world's deepest living apex predators, and will not hesitate to eat anything they meet, including their own kind.

Their larvae were originally believed to represent a distinct genus (Macristium) and even family.

The two bathysaurid species, Bathysaurus mollis and Bathysaurus ferox are hermaphrodites, meaning they sport both male and female sex organs, but not much is known about their mating and breeding habits due to the great depth the two species live at.

== Species ==
The currently recognized species in this genus are:

- Bathysaurus ferox Günther, 1878 (deepsea lizardfish)
- Bathysaurus mollis Günther, 1878 (highfin lizardfish)
