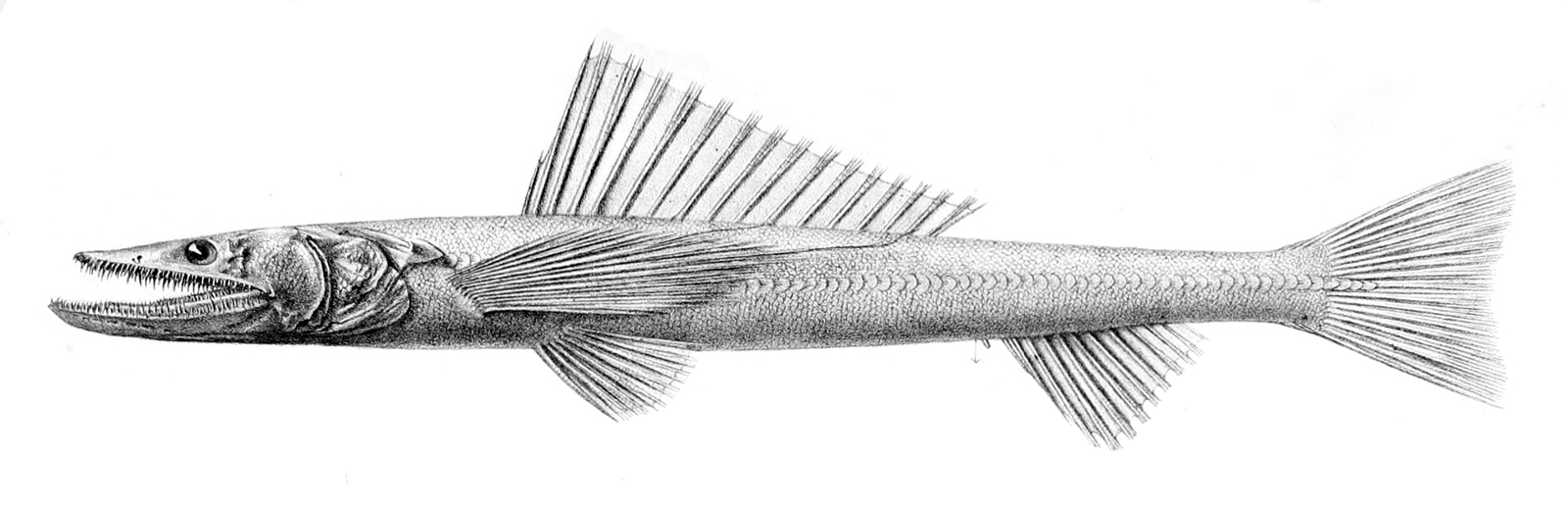

Conservation status
- Least Concern (IUCN 3.1)

Scientific classification
- Kingdom: Animalia
- Phylum: Chordata
- Class: Actinopterygii
- Order: Aulopiformes
- Family: Bathysauridae
- Genus: Bathysaurus
- Species: B. ferox

Binomial name
- Bathysaurus ferox Günther, 1878

= Deepsea lizardfish =

Species of fish

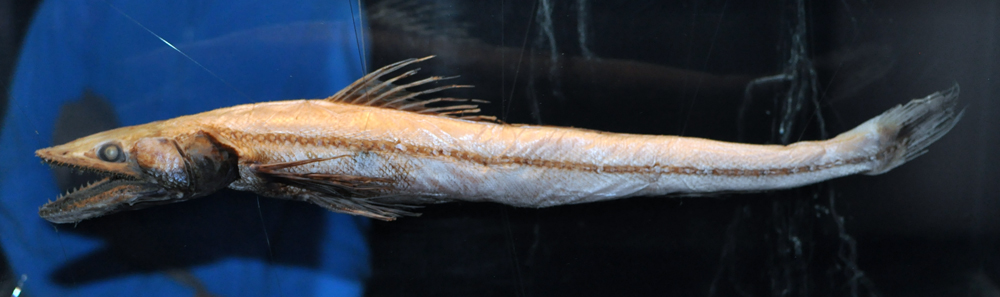

The deepsea lizardfish (Bathysaurus ferox) is an aulopiform of the family Bathysauridae, found in tropical and subtropical seas across the world. The deepsea lizardfish should not be confused with the true or "typical" lizardfishes of the related family Synodontidae.

== Taxonomy ==
Deepsea lizardfishes were first described in 1878 by British zoologist Albert Günther, who created the generic name from ancient Greek word elements "báthos" and "saûros" meaning "lizard of the depths". Previously recognized in the synodontidae, in 1996, Robert Karl Johnson et al. showed its relationships outside synodontidae, in its own family in the suborder Giganturoidei.

At the beginning of the 20th century, Bathysaurus ferox larvae were thought to be a distinct species called Macristium chavesi. Johnson gave evidence of the synonymy of the two species.

== Appearance ==
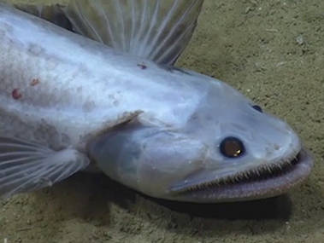
A deepsea lizardfish in Guayanilla Canyon off Puerto Rico on 16 April 2015

Deepsea lizardfish resemble shallow-water lizardfishes, as reflected in their common names. Adults reach over 70 cm in length, and have a slender, cylindrical body. Their lizard-like bony head is flattened, unlike in most fishes, and an enormous mouth is filled with multiple series of long, sharp and needle like teeth for piercing and trapping prey. Bathysaurus ferox are whitish, grey or brown in color, and are covered in tough scales, which are enlarged along the lateral line. The large, well developed eyes, with large pupils, are evidence of the importance of vision for prey detection. Although residual sunlight does not penetrate the depths inhabited by deep-sea lizardfish, their eyes aid in detecting distinct sources of residual or bioluminescent light. Deep-sea lizardfish have been known to have an expansive liver constituting up to 20% of total weight, serving as an energy reserve to sustain growth between sporadic feeding episodes.

== Habitat ==
Deepsea lizardfish are typical inhabitants of the deep ocean floor. They are found circumglobally, in tropical and temperate latitudes (between 65° N and 40° S) at depths of 600 to 3,500 metres (1,970 to 11,500 feet) in the aphotic zone, where water temperatures range between 3 and 4 °C (37 and 39 °F).

The energy-poor ecosystem in which the fish live dictates low population densities. Along the Mid-Atlantic Bight, a density of zero to eight fish per 25,000 square metres (269,098 sq ft) has been reported.

== Feeding habits ==
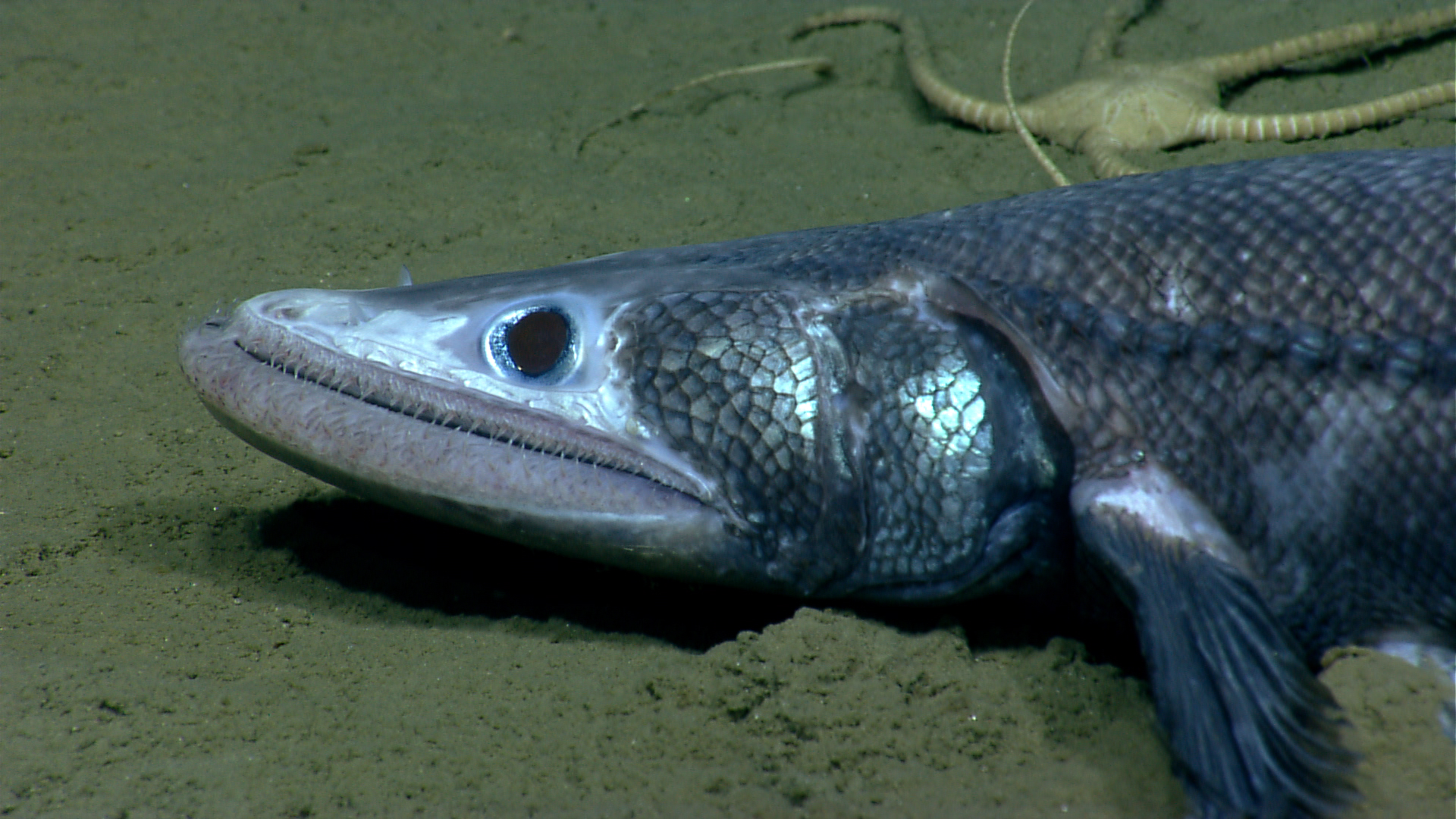
B. ferox waiting for prey

Deepsea lizardfish are one of the world's deepest living apex predators, and will not hesitate to eat anything they meet, including their own kind. They are predominantly piscivores, hunting deep-dwelling demersal and bathypelagic fishes. Occasionally, they also feed on crustaceans and molluscs, as well as on dead fish drifting down from above.

Most of the time, the deepsea lizardfish maintains a motionless stance on the substrate, with head and fore-body raised, waiting for prey. Being well equipped to pursue and devour whole prey, it captures it by lunging forward in a sudden rapid burst, accompanied by a snap of its trap-like jaws.

== Conservation ==
Although they are common inhabitants of the ocean floor, these deep-sea fish are considered a conservation concern.

== Reproduction ==
Deepsea lizardfish are hermaphrodites, bearing both male and female sex organs, thought to be an adaptation to low population densities. Mature gonads found in samples from November to January off the coast of Virginia show that their reproduction is synchronous, a means of maximizing breeding population densities without increasing the size of the feeding population. Mean fecundity rates of around 32,000 ova per fish were observed for eight specimens. Not much is known about their mating habits; however, larval deepsea lizardfish have been recorded at the surface of the ocean.
