= Parascopelus =

Scientific classification
- Domain: Eukaryota
- Kingdom: Animalia
- Phylum: Chordata
- Class: Actinopterygii
- Order: Alepisauriformes
- Genus: †Parascopelus

Extinct genus of fishes

Parascopelus (meaning "watches along") is a genus of prehistoric fish.
