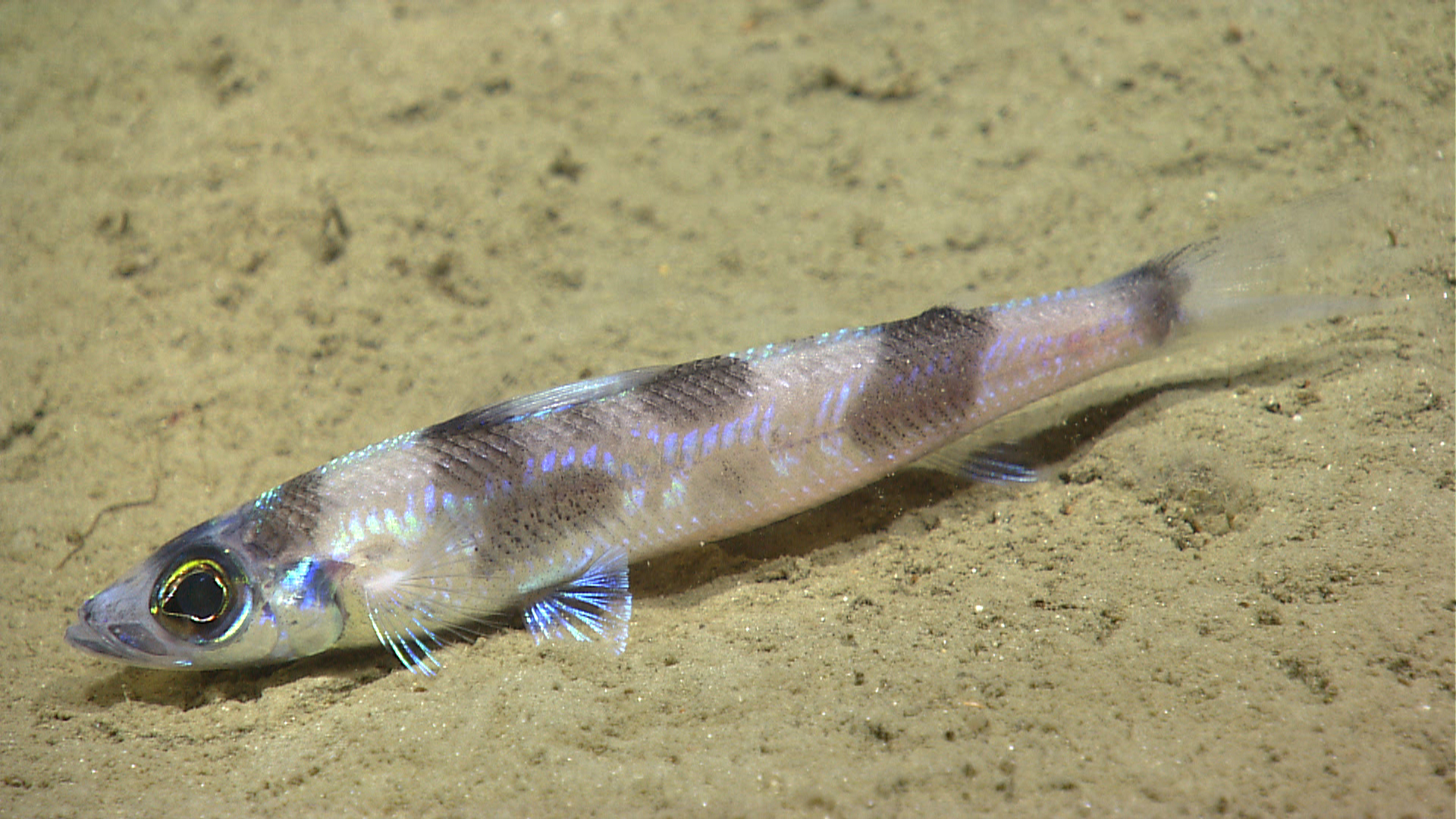
- Chlorophthalmus agassizi
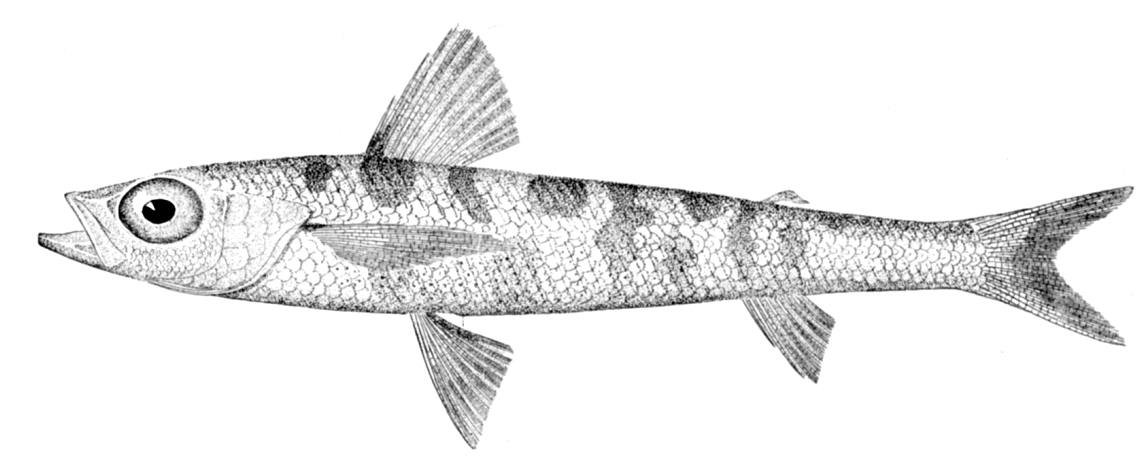
- Chlorophthalmus chalybeius

Scientific classification
- Kingdom: Animalia
- Phylum: Chordata
- Class: Actinopterygii
- Order: Aulopiformes
- Family: Chlorophthalmidae
- Genus: Chlorophthalmus; Bonaparte, 1840

Type species
- Chlorophthalmus agassizi Bonaparte, 1840

Synonyms
- Hyphalonedrus Goode, 1881; Pelopsia Facciolà, 1883

= Chlorophthalmus =

Genus of fishes

Chlorophthalmus is a genus of greeneyes.

The species is distinguished by a silvery gray body with black spots and dark crossbar traces, a lower jaw that ends in a peculiar horizontal plate with spine-like processes, and other unique characteristics including body part sizes and proportions. At depths of 200 to 500 metres (660 to 1,640 ft), C. corniger is mostly found in the northern part of the Indian Ocean, extending from southern Java, Indonesia, to Somalia.

== Species ==
There are currently 20 recognized species in this genus:

- Chlorophthalmus acutifrons Hiyama, 1940 (Greeneye)
- Chlorophthalmus agassizi Bonaparte, 1840 (Shortnose greeneye)
- Chlorophthalmus albatrossis D. S. Jordan & Starks, 1904
- Chlorophthalmus atlanticus Poll, 1953 (Atlantic greeneye)
- Chlorophthalmus basiniger Porkofiev, 2020
- Chlorophthalmus borealis Kuronuma & M. Yamaguchi, 1941
- Chlorophthalmus brasiliensis Mead, 1958
- Chlorophthalmus corniger Alcock, 1894
- Chlorophthalmus ichthyandri Kotlyar & Parin, 1986
- Chlorophthalmus imperator Fujiwara, Wada & Motomura, 2019
- Chlorophthalmus mascarensis Kobyliansky, 2013
- Chlorophthalmus mento Garman, 1899
- Chlorophthalmus nigromarginatus Kamohara, 1953 (Blackedge greeneye)
- Chlorophthalmus pectoralis Okamura & M. Doi, 1984
- Chlorophthalmus productus Günther, 1887
- Chlorophthalmus proridens C. H. Gilbert & Cramer, 1897
- Chlorophthalmus punctatus Gilchrist, 1904 (Spotted greeneye)
- Chlorophthalmus vityazi Kobyliansky, 2013
- Chlorophthalmus vulcanus Fricke & Durville, 2020
- Chlorophthalmus zvezdae Kotlyar & Parin, 1986

Synonyms

- Chlorophthalmus bicornis Norman, 1939; valid as C. corniger
- Chlorophthalmus chalybeius Goode, 1881; valid as C. agassizi
