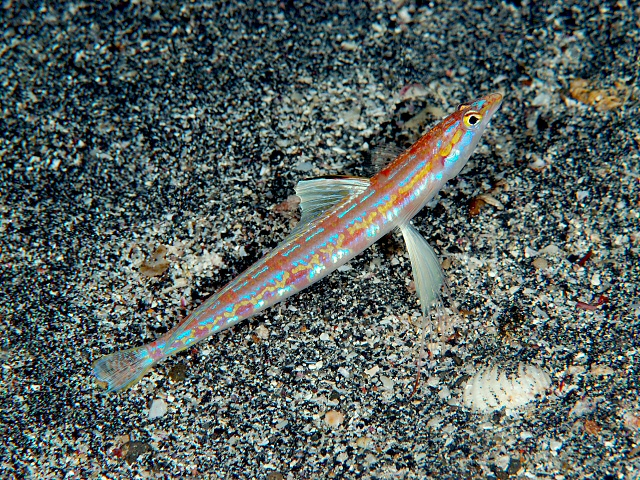
- Pseudotrichonotus altivelis photographed off the Izu Peninsula of Japan by さら

Conservation status
- Data Deficient (IUCN 3.1)

Scientific classification
- Kingdom: Animalia
- Phylum: Chordata
- Class: Actinopterygii
- Division: Teleostei
- Order: Aulopiformes
- Family: Pseudotrichonotidae
- Genus: Pseudotrichonotus
- Species: P. altivelis

Binomial name
- Pseudotrichonotus altivelis Yoshino and Araga, 1975

= Pseudotrichonotus altivelis =

Species of fish

Pseudotrichonotus altivelis is a species of sand-dwelling lizardfish found in the Pacific Ocean off the coast of Japan.

== Discovery and etymology ==
Pseudotrichonotus altivelis was described in 1975 by Yoshino and Araga in the 1975 book Coastal Fishes of Southern Japan. It was first collected collected near Izu Oceanic Park off of the Izu Peninsula in an area subject to strong tidal currents.

The scientific name of the species derives from the Latin altus, meaning high, and velis, meaning sail, in reference to the distinct shape of the fish's dorsal fin.

It has no known vernacular name in English but is referred to as ホタテエソ in Japanese.

== Morphology ==
Pseudotrichonotus altivelis has a yellow stripe running along the midline flanked by two iridescent blue stripes and overlaid by reddish bars. The dorsal fin is long and has a black patch at the anterior aspect. The anterior portion of the fin is generally held upright while the posterior portion remains folded along the back, giving the fin a sail-like appearance.

== Habitat and behavior ==
Pseudotrichonotus altivelis inhabits coastal waters near the Izu Peninsula and Kashiwajima. The abundance of photographs of this fish suggest that it is relatively abundant.

Pseudotrichonotus altivelis buries itself in the sand when startled. P. altivelis has been observed flicking the black-bordered anterior portion of the dorsal fin up and down; the purpose of this display is unknown but has been hypothesized to be a territorial or courtship display.
