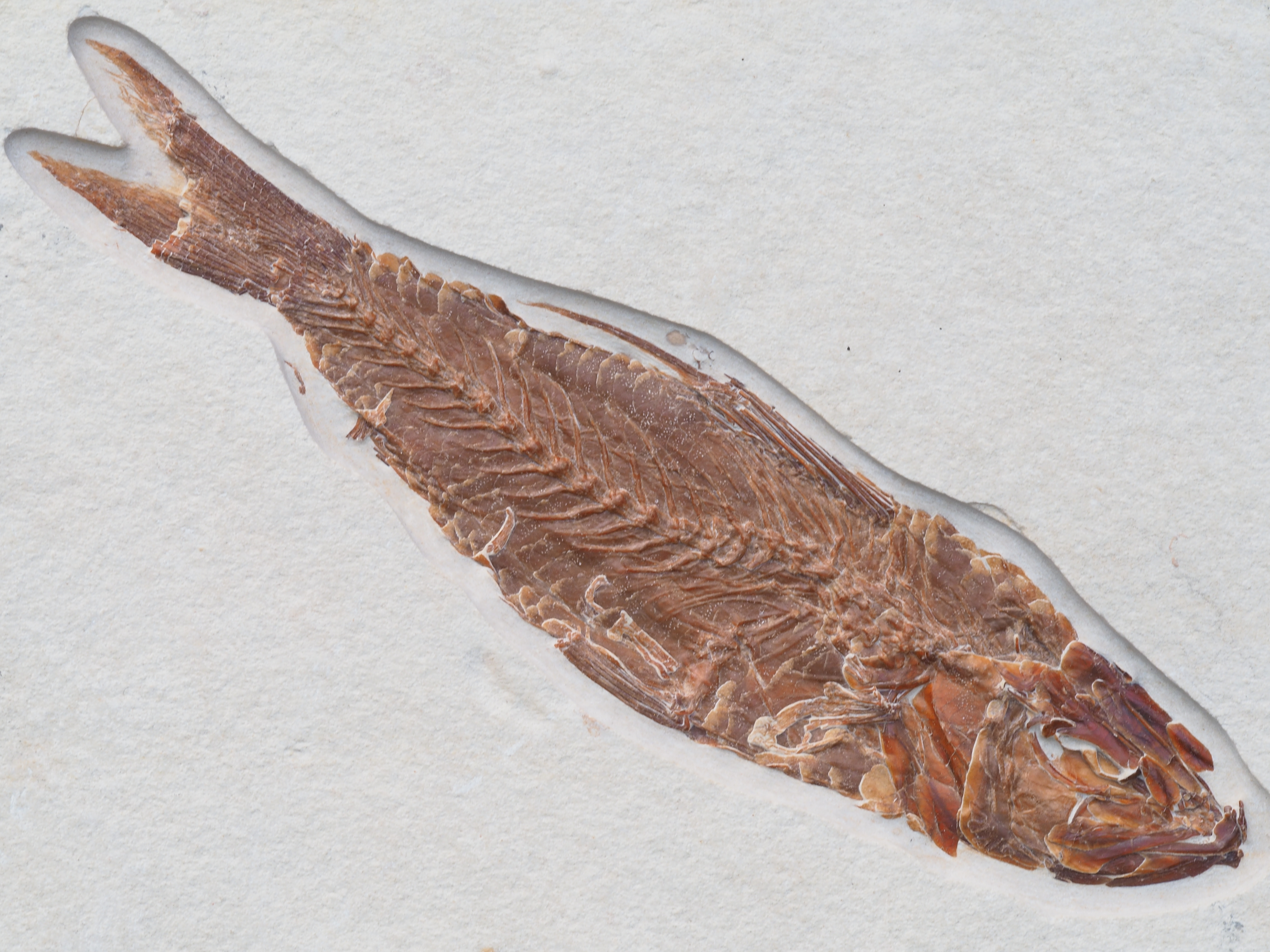
- Specimen of A. dodgei

Scientific classification
- Kingdom: Animalia
- Phylum: Chordata
- Class: Actinopterygii
- Order: Aulopiformes
- Family: Chlorophthalmidae
- Genus: †Acrognathus; Agassiz, 1836

Type species
- †Acrognathus boops Agassiz, 1836

Species
- A. boops Agassiz, 1836; A. dodgei Hay, 1903; A. libanicus Woodward, 1901

= Acrognathus =

Acrognathus Temporal range: Upper Cenomanian to Turonian, 95–89 Ma

Extinct genus of lizardfish

Acrognathus (from Greek: άκρος ákros, 'high' and Greek: γνάθος gnáthos 'jaw') is an extinct genus of ray-finned fish belonging to the order Aulopiformes. Although no extensive systematic analysis has been performed, it is tentatively placed with the greeneyes in the family Chlorophthalmidae, making it the oldest representative of that family.

The following species are known:

- A. boops Agassiz, 1836 (late Cenomanian/Coniacian to Turonian of the United Kingdom)
- A. dodgei Hay, 1903 (late Cenomanian of Lebanon)
- A. libanicus Woodward, 1901 (late Cenomanian of Lebanon)
