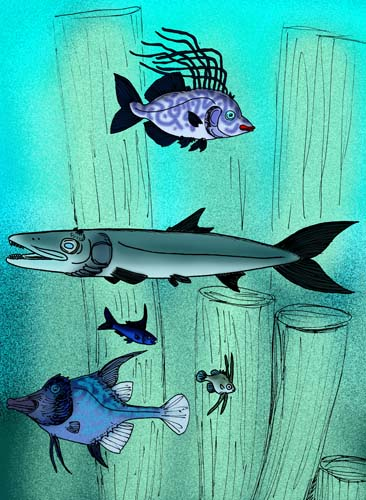
- Artist's reconstruction

Scientific classification
- Kingdom: Animalia
- Phylum: Chordata
- Class: Actinopterygii
- Order: Aulopiformes
- Family: †Nardorexidae
- Genus: †Nardorex; Taverne, 2004

Type species
- Nardorex zorzini Taverne, 2004

= Nardorex =

Nardorex Temporal range: Campanian to Maastrichtian

Extinct genus of ray-finned fishes

Nardorex zorzini is an extinct nektonic predatory aulopiform ray-finned fish from Late Cretaceous Italy.

== Description ==
Nardorex zorzini is a superficially mackerel-like animal whose overall anatomy places it within the order Aulopiformes. However, the details of its osteology make its placement within Aulopiformes problematic.

== Distribution ==
Specimens of N. zorzini are found in Campanian to Maastrichtian-aged marine strata of Nardo, Italy.
