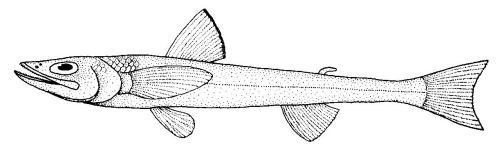

Scientific classification
- Domain: Eukaryota
- Kingdom: Animalia
- Phylum: Chordata
- Class: Actinopterygii
- Order: Aulopiformes
- Family: Bathysauropsidae
- Genus: Bathysauropsis
- Species: B. gracilis

Binomial name
- Bathysauropsis gracilis (Günther, 1878)

= Black lizardfish =

Species of fish

The black lizardfish or deep-water greeneye (Bathysauropsis gracilis) is a grinner of the genus Bathysauropsis, found around the world in the southern oceans, at depths between 1,500 and 3,000 m. Its length is from 20 to 30 cm.
