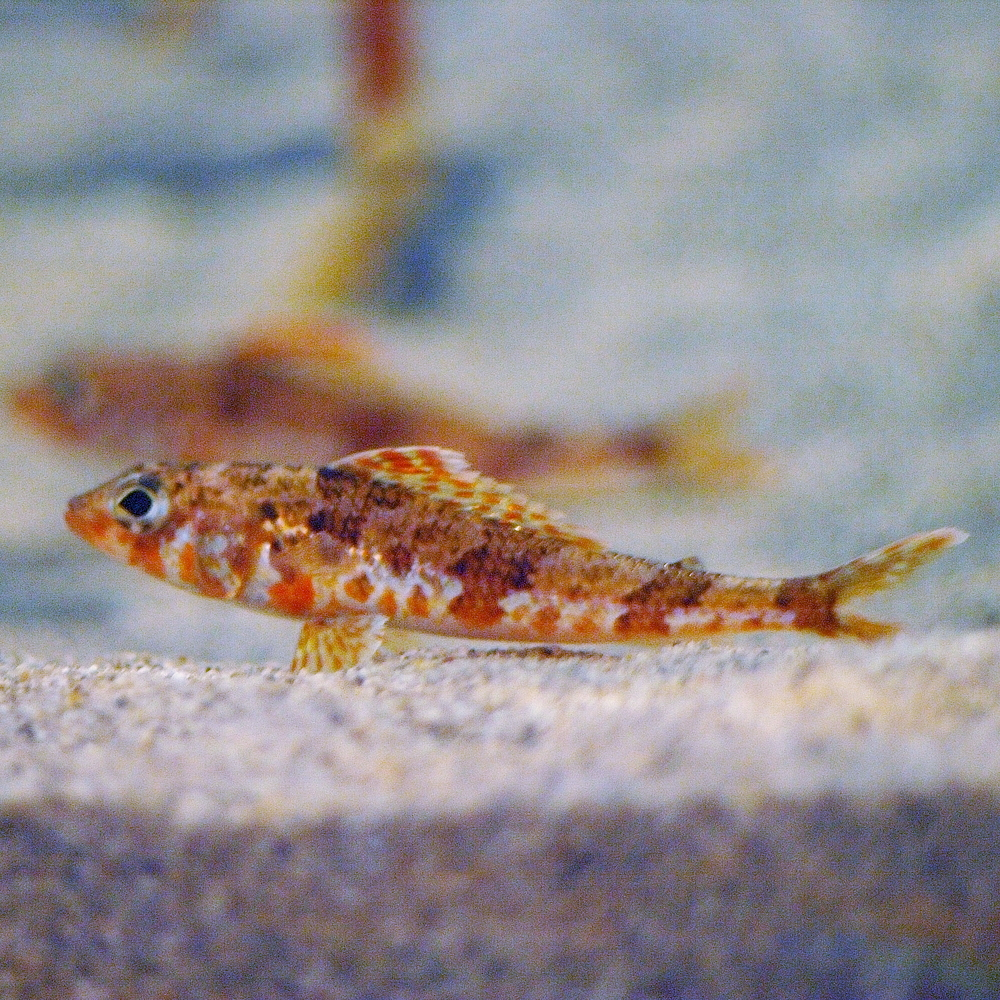
- Hime japonica

Scientific classification
- Kingdom: Animalia
- Phylum: Chordata
- Class: Actinopterygii
- Division: Teleostei
- Order: Aulopiformes
- Family: Aulopidae
- Genus: Hime; Starks, 1924

Type species
- Aulopus japonicus Günther, 1877

Species
- See text

= Hime (fish) =

Genus of ray-finned fishes

Hime is a genus of flagfins native to the eastern Indian Ocean and the western Pacific Ocean.

== Species ==
The recognized species in this genus are:

- Hime capitonis M. F. Gomon & Struthers, 2015 (New Caledonian flagfin)
- Hime caudizoma M. F. Gomon & Struthers, 2015 (Indonesian flagfin)
- Hime curtirostris (J. M. Thomson, 1967) (short-snout threadsail)
- Hime formosana (S. C. Lee & W. C. Chao, 1994)
- Hime japonica (Günther, 1877) (Japanese thread-sail)
- Hime microps Parin & Kotlyar, 1989
- Hime pyrhistion M. F. Gomon, Struthers & A. L. Stewart, 2013 (flaming flagfin)
- Hime surrubea M. F. Gomon & Struthers, 2015 (rosy flagfin)
