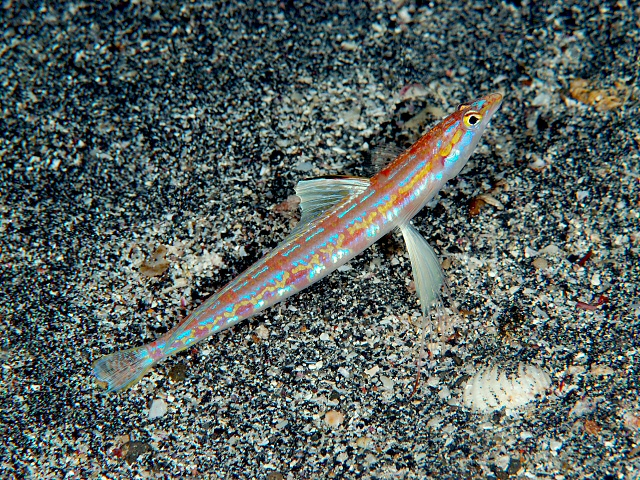
- Pseudotrichonotus altivelis

Scientific classification
- Kingdom: Animalia
- Phylum: Chordata
- Class: Actinopterygii
- Order: Aulopiformes
- Suborder: Aulopoidei
- Family: Pseudotrichonotidae; Yoshino & Araga, 1975
- Genus: Pseudotrichonotus; Yoshino & Araga, 1975

= Pseudotrichonotus =

Genus of fishes

Pseudotrichonotus is a genus of fish in the family Pseudotrichonotidae native to the Indian and Pacific Ocean. This genus consists of four species of sand-diving lizardfish and is the only member of its family.

== History and Etymology ==
The name Pseudotrichonotus comes from the Greek pseudes, meaning false, and Trichonotus, another genus of sand-diving fish to which it bears a superficial resemblance.

Their common name comes from their habit of submerging themselves in substrate.

== Morphology ==
Members of this genus have long cylindrical bodies with relatively small mouths and long dorsal fins. The anterior portion of the fin is generally held erect while the posterior portion is pressed against the back, concealing its true shape.

Pseudotrichonotus species lack a swim bladder.

== Species ==
There are currently 4 recognized species in this genus:

- Pseudotrichonotus altivelis Yoshino & Araga, 1975
- Pseudotrichonotus belos A. C. Gill & Pogonoski, 2016 (Dart sand-diving lizardfish)
- Pseudotrichonotus caeruleoflavus G. R. Allen, Erdmann, Suharti & Sianipar, 2017
- Pseudotrichonotus xanthotaenia Parin, 1992
