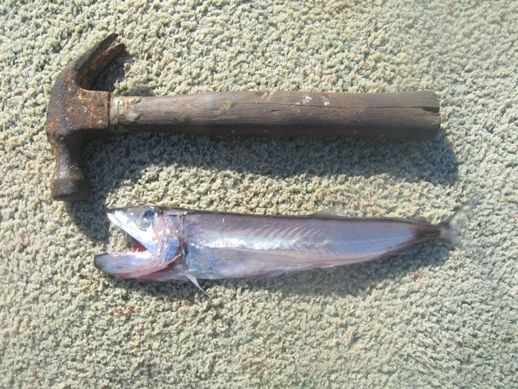

Conservation status
- Least Concern (IUCN 3.1)

Scientific classification
- Kingdom: Animalia
- Phylum: Chordata
- Class: Actinopterygii
- Division: Teleostei
- Order: Aulopiformes
- Suborder: Alepisauroidei
- Family: Omosudidae; Regan, 1911
- Genus: Omosudis; Günther, 1887
- Species: O. lowii

Binomial name
- Omosudis lowii Günther, 1887

= Hammerjaw =

Species of fish

The hammerjaw, Omosudis lowii, is a small deep-sea aulopiform fish, found worldwide in tropical and temperate waters to 4,000 m (13,000 ft) depth. It is the only representative of its family, Omosudidae (from the Greek omo, "shoulder", and Latin sudis, either "esox, fish of the Rhine" or "stake").

== Description ==
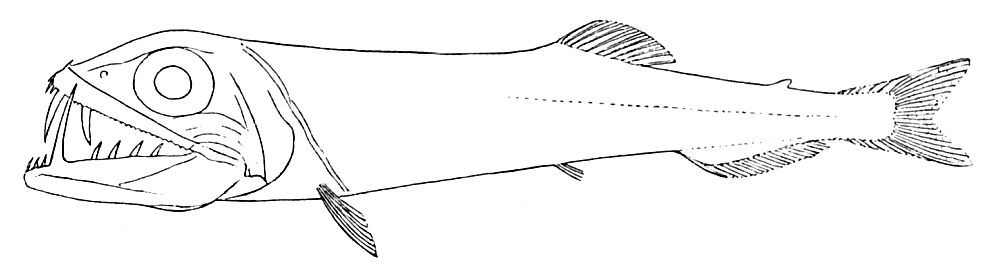
Illustration of a hammerjaw

The large head is dominated by a massive, truncated lower jaw and large, high-set eyes. The lower jaw has a dark, almost black distal end, "chin". The lower jaw possesses at least one pair of oversized, transparent, and dagger-like teeth; the palatines possess 1–4 pairs of slightly smaller teeth. The body itself is scaleless and laterally compressed; it is covered in iridescent, silvery-gray guanine with the dark peritoneum peeking through in places. Dark smoky gray dorsally, the body tapers strongly towards a thin caudal peduncle (which has a dermal keel) and deeply forked caudal fin. The caudal peduncle is a smoky black color, darker than the body and tail. All fins are spineless; both the low-slung pectoral fins (with 11–16 soft rays) and abdominal pelvic fins (with eight soft rays) are fairly small.

The single dorsal fin (with 9–12 soft rays) and anal fin (14–16 soft rays) are roughly equal in size; the anal fin's origin lies immediately posterior to the dorsal. The lateral line is uninterrupted and the gill rakers number 20–25. Like other members of their order, hammerjaws also possess a small adipose fin. The largest recorded hammerjaw measured 23 cm (9 inches) standard length (excluding the caudal fin).

== Life history ==
Very little is known of the hammerjaw's life history. It inhabits the mesopelagic and bathypelagic zones down to 4,000 m and is never caught in large numbers. It is inferred from their sporadic capture and sleek morphology that hammerjaws are swift swimmers—capable of avoiding sampling nets. Hammerjaws appear to spawn year-round; like many other deep-sea aulopiform fish, they are hermaphrodites. They are carnivorous and feed on squid and other pelagic fish; in turn, hammerjaws are known prey of lancetfish and tuna.
