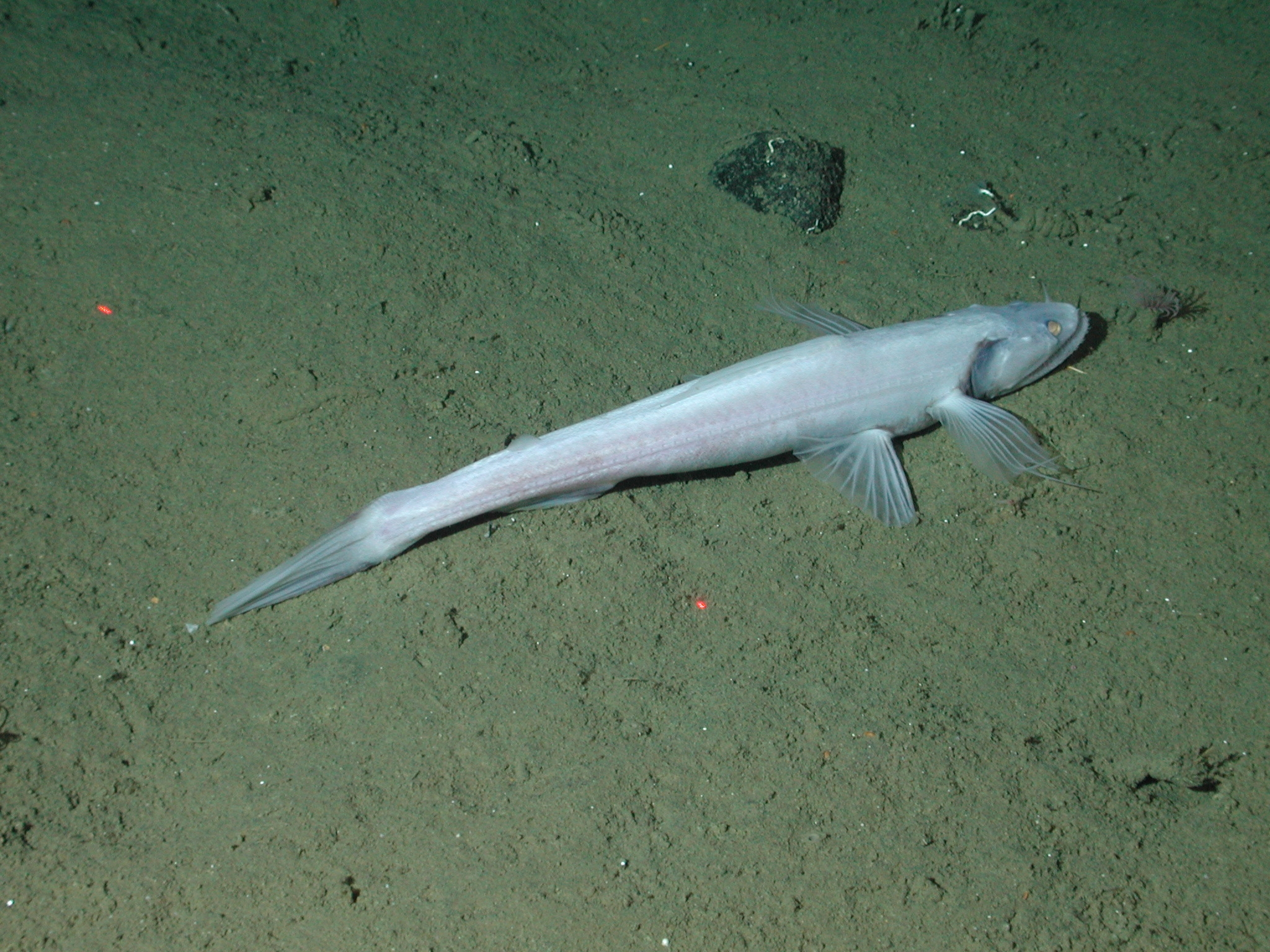

Conservation status
- Least Concern (IUCN 3.1)

Scientific classification
- Kingdom: Animalia
- Phylum: Chordata
- Class: Actinopterygii
- Division: Teleostei
- Order: Aulopiformes
- Family: Bathysauridae
- Genus: Bathysaurus
- Species: B. mollis

Binomial name
- Bathysaurus mollis Günther, 1878

= Bathysaurus mollis =

Species of fish

Bathysaurus mollis is a species of fish in the family Bathysauridae, commonly called bathysaur or highfin lizardfish.
