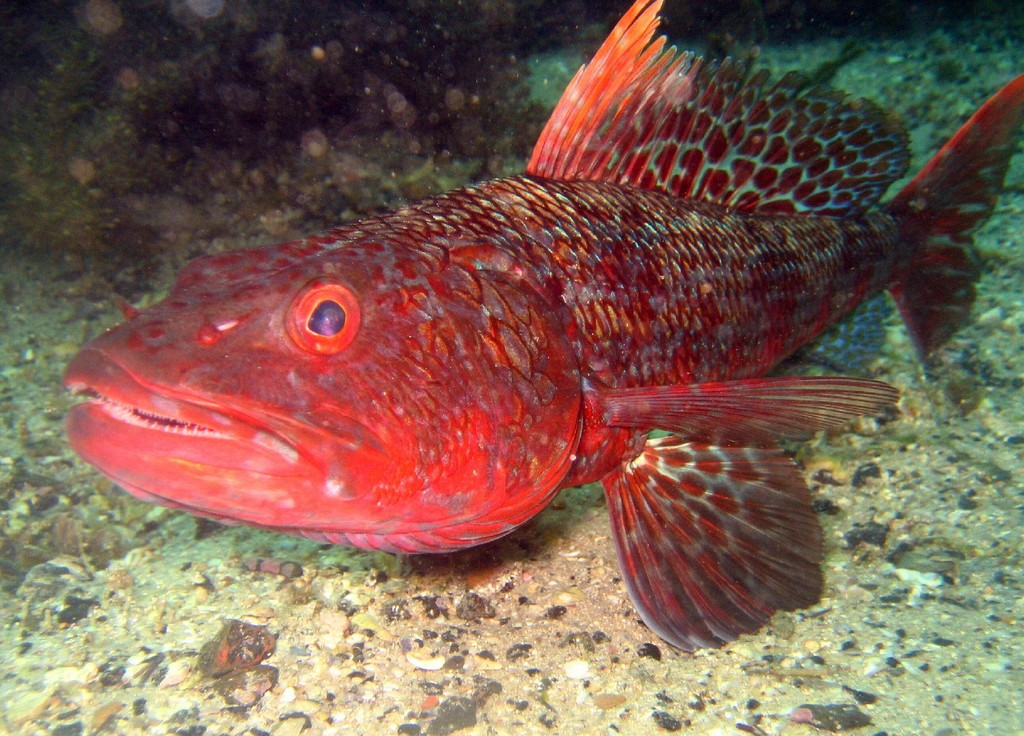

Conservation status
- Least Concern (IUCN 3.1)

Scientific classification
- Kingdom: Animalia
- Phylum: Chordata
- Class: Actinopterygii
- Division: Teleostei
- Order: Aulopiformes
- Family: Aulopidae
- Genus: Latropiscis; Whitley, 1931
- Species: L. purpurissatus

Binomial name
- Latropiscis purpurissatus (J. Richardson, 1843)

Synonyms
- Aulopus purpurissatus J. Richardson, 1843; Hime purpurissata (J. Richardson, 1843); Aulopus milesii Valenciennes, 1850

= Latropiscis =

Monospecific genus of ray-finned fish

Latropiscis purpurissatus, the sergeant baker, is a species of marine ray-finned fish belonging to the family Aulopidae, the flagfins. It is the only species in the monospecific genus Latropiscis. This species is endemic to the temperate coasts of Australia.

== Taxonomy ==
Latropiscis purpurissatus was first formally described as Aulopus purpurissatus in 1843 by the Scottish naval surgeon, naturalist and Arctic explorer John Richardson with its type locality given as the Houtman Abrolhos Islands in Western Australia. In 1931 Gilbert Percy Whitley proposed the new genus Latropiscis with Aulopus milesii designated as its type species. A. milesi is now considered to be a synonym of A. purpurissatus and Latropiscis is a monotypic taxon with L. purpurissatus as its only species. This taxon is classified within the family Aulopidae, the flagfins in the order Aulopiformes, the lizardfishes and related taxa.

== Etymology ==
Latropiscis purpurissatus is the only species in the genus Latropiscis, a name that Whitley did not explain the etymology of. It is thought that it might be a combination of latro, a Latin word meaning "robber", "mercenary" or "hunter", which may be an allusion to Whitley's description of this benthic ambush predator "hiding among rocks and weeds". The specific name, purpurissatus is Latin for "dressed" or "coloured" in purple, the overall colour of this fish. The common name, sergeant baker, is thought to be a reference to William Baker, the sergeant orderly to Governor Phillip, who was reputed to be a keen fisherman and may have been the first European settler to catch this fish.

== Description ==
Latropiscis purpurissatus has between 19 and 22 rays in its dorsal fin, it has a adipose fin and an anal fin which is supported by 12 to 14 rays. It has a moderately elongated body which tapers towards the tail with some compression to the sides. It has a large head and mouth with moderately sized eyes. The teeth are thin, sharp and curved with each jaw having two rows of teeth, the teeth on the upper jaw being larger than those on the lower jaw. The second ray of the dorsal fin is highly elongated in adult males. The caudal fin is forked and the pelvic fins are wide, with their origin immediately to the rearof the pectoral fin base. They are coloured deep reddish to purple on the back and flanks with pearly to yellowish-white on the underside. The fins are yellow, with variable scarlet, red, orange and brown blotches and spots. The eyes are orange and crimson. This species reaches a total length of 60 cm (24 in).

== Distribution and habitat ==
Latropiscis purpurissatus is endemic to Australia where it is found from just north of Brisbane in Queensland south to Tasmania, and west and north to just north of Shark Bay in Western Australis. It is found from inshore shallow water to a depth of 250 m (820 ft) on the upper continental slope. It is a demersal fish, typically occurring among rocks and coral in areas of soft bottom near the coast.

== Behaviour ==
Latropiscis purpurissatus is an ambush predator, hiding among the rocks and corals, feeding on benthic invertebrates and other fishes.

== Utilisation ==
Latropiscis purpurissatus is caught by hook and line fishers, the flesh is said to be very palatable but it is not highly regarded.
