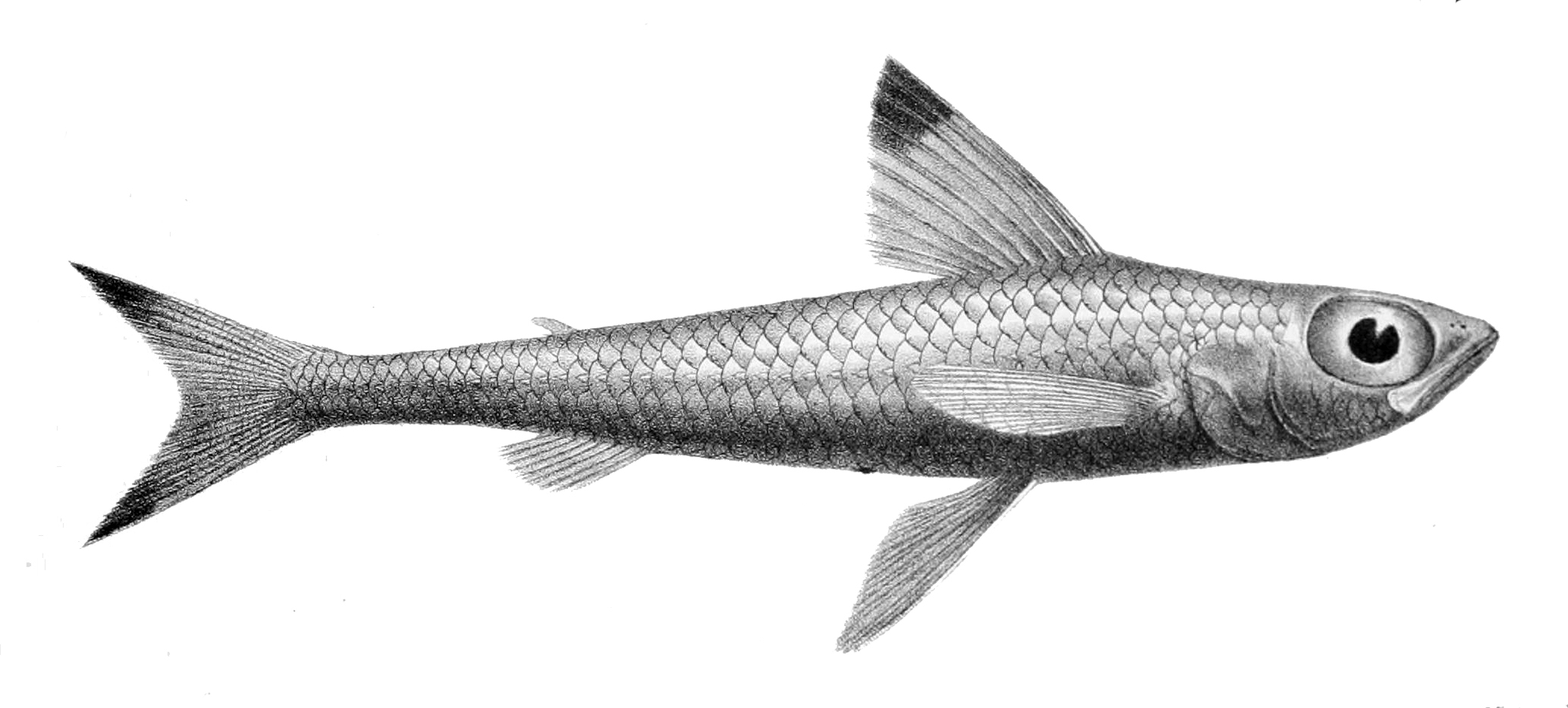

Scientific classification
- Domain: Eukaryota
- Kingdom: Animalia
- Phylum: Chordata
- Class: Actinopterygii
- Order: Aulopiformes
- Family: Paraulopidae
- Genus: Paraulopus
- Species: P. nigripinnis

Binomial name
- Paraulopus nigripinnis (Günther, 1878)

= Paraulopus nigripinnis =

Cucumber fish

Species of fish

Paraulopus nigripinnis, the cucumber fish, ‘’‘Montague whiting’’’ is a grinner of the genus Paraulopus. It is a deep water fish found around southern Australia and New Zealand on the continental shelf at depths between 65 and 600 m. Their length is between 15 and 20 cm. They were first described by Günther in 1878.
