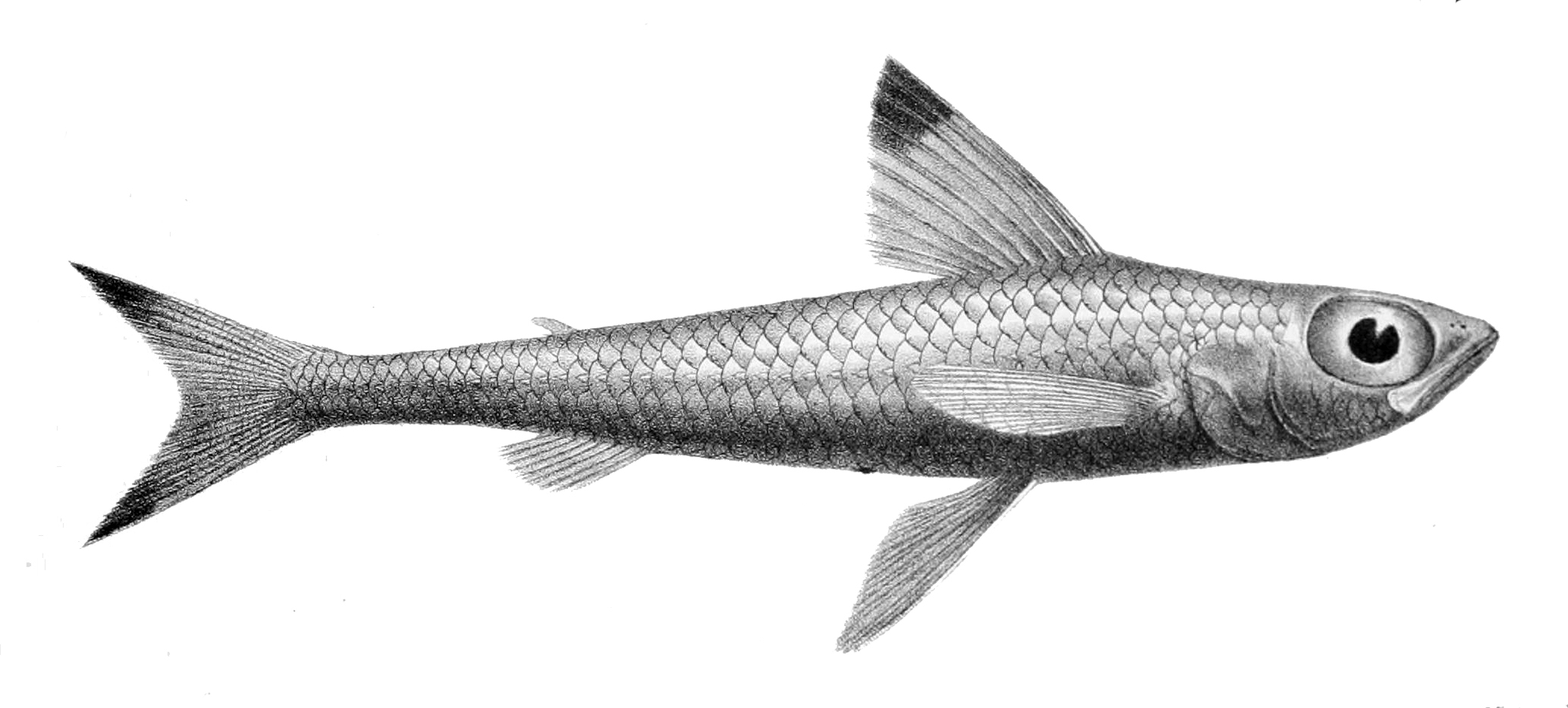
- Paraulopus nigripinnis

Scientific classification
- Kingdom: Animalia
- Phylum: Chordata
- Class: Actinopterygii
- Order: Aulopiformes
- Suborder: Synodontoidei
- Family: Paraulopidae; Tomoyasu Sato & Nakabo, 2002
- Genus: Paraulopus; Tomoyasu Sato & Nakabo, 2002

Species
- See text.

= Paraulopus =

Paraulopus Temporal range: Aptian–present

Genus of fishes

Paraulopus is the only genus in the family Paraulopidae, a family of grinners in the order Aulopiformes. They are commonly known as cucumberfishes, but locally some other Teleostei are also known by that name. They were considered in the Chlorophthalmidae or greeneye family until 2001.

The fishes tend to be slender and cylindrical, with large eyes and a large terminal mouth with only slightly protruding lower jaw.

The earliest known fossil evidence of cucumberfishes are otoliths from the Aptian and Albian of Spain, France, and Texas. It remains uncertain whether these otoliths actually belong to Paraulopus itself or to an extinct fossil paraulopid genus.

== Species ==
The currently recognized species in this genus are:

- Paraulopus atripes Tomoyasu Sato & Nakabo, 2003
- Paraulopus balteatus M. F. Gomon, 2010 (banded cucumberfish)
- Paraulopus brevirostris (Fourmanoir, 1981) (shortsnout cucumberfish)
- Paraulopus filamentosus (Okamura, 1982)
- Paraulopus japonicus (Kamohara, 1956)
- Paraulopus legandi (Fourmanoir & Rivaton, 1979)
- Paraulopus longianalis Tomoyasu Sato, M. F. Gomon & Nakabo, 2010 (longfin cucumberfish)
- Paraulopus maculatus (Kotthaus, 1967)
- Paraulopus melanogrammus M. F. Gomon & Tomoyasu Sato, 2004 (blackline cucumberfish)
- Paraulopus melanostomus Tomoyasu Sato, M. F. Gomon & Nakabo, 2010 (licoricemouth cucumberfish)
- Paraulopus nigripinnis (Günther, 1878) (cucumber fish)
- Paraulopus novaeseelandiae Tomoyasu Sato & Nakabo, 2002
- Paraulopus oblongus (Kamohara, 1953)
- Paraulopus okamurai Tomoyasu Sato & Nakabo, 2002 (piedtip cucumberfish)

Fossil taxa include:

- Paraulopus? applanatus Nolf, 2004 (Cenomanian of France)
- Paraulopus? manei Nolf, 2004 (Aptian of Spain)
- Paraulopus? pseudocentrolophus Nolf, 2004 (Aptian of Spain)
- Paraulopus pseudoperca Nolf & Dockery, 1990 (Campanian to Paleocene of the United States and Germany)
- Paraulopus? wichitae Schwarzhans, Stringer & Welton, 2022 (Albian of Texas)
