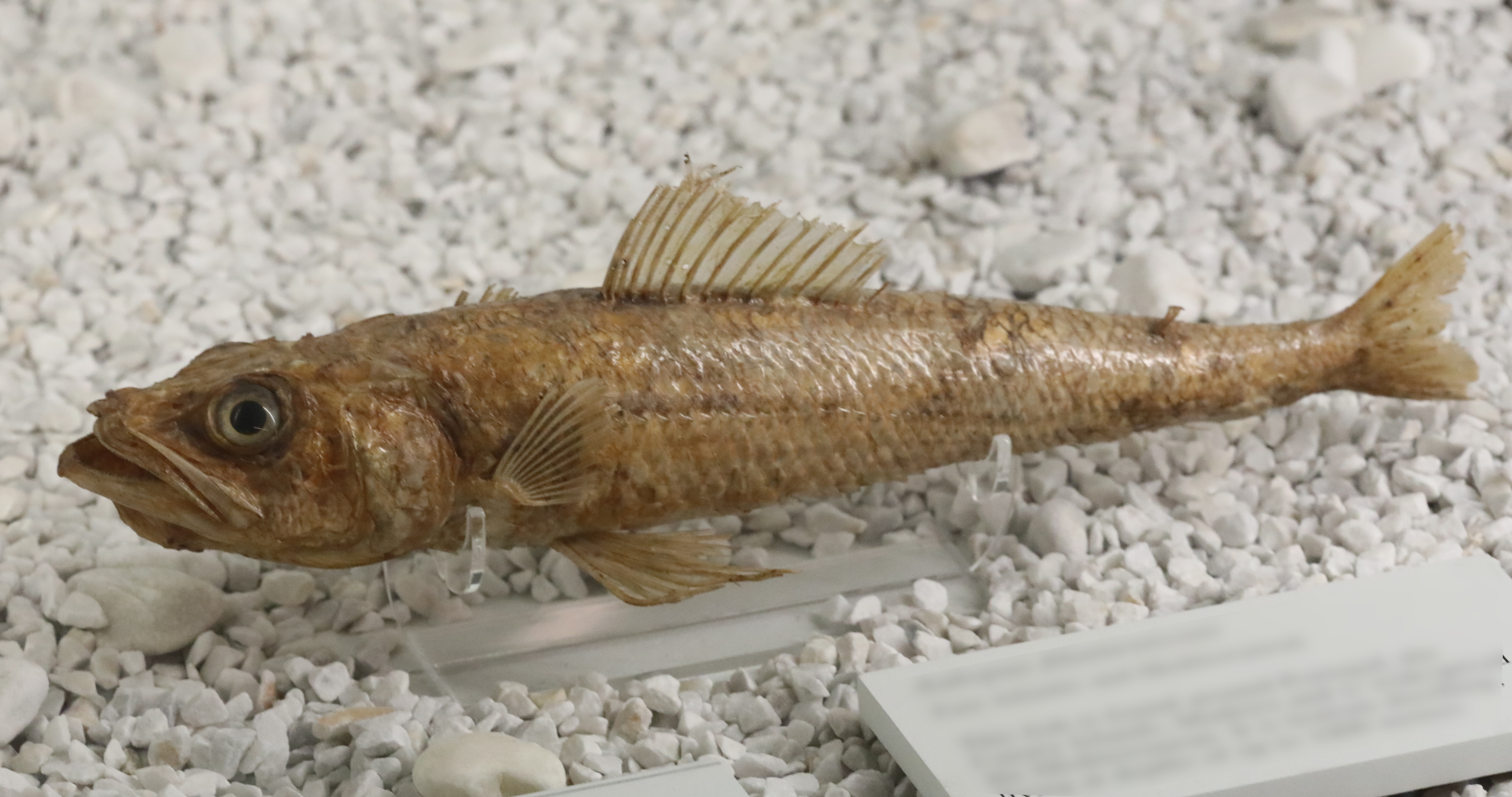
- Taxidermied Aulopus filamentosus at the Natural History Museum at Tring

Scientific classification
- Domain: Eukaryota
- Kingdom: Animalia
- Phylum: Chordata
- Class: Actinopterygii
- Order: Aulopiformes
- Family: Aulopidae
- Genus: Aulopus; Cloquet, 1816

Species
- See text

= Aulopus =

Genus of ray-finned fishes

Aulopus is a genus of flagfins native to the Atlantic Ocean and the Pacific Ocean. Although Aulopus is native to both the Atlantic and the Pacific oceans, for the first time in 2010 Aulopus filamentosus (the royal flagfin), was spotted in Brazilian waters. A discovery like this may suggest that these fish can be found in new environments.

== Species ==
The recognized species in this genus are:

- Aulopus bajacali Parin & Kotlyar, 1984 (eastern Pacific flagfin)
- Aulopus cadenati Poll, 1953 (Guinean flagfin)
- Aulopus diactithrix Prokofiev, 2008
- Aulopus filamentosus (Bloch, 1792) (royal flagfin)
