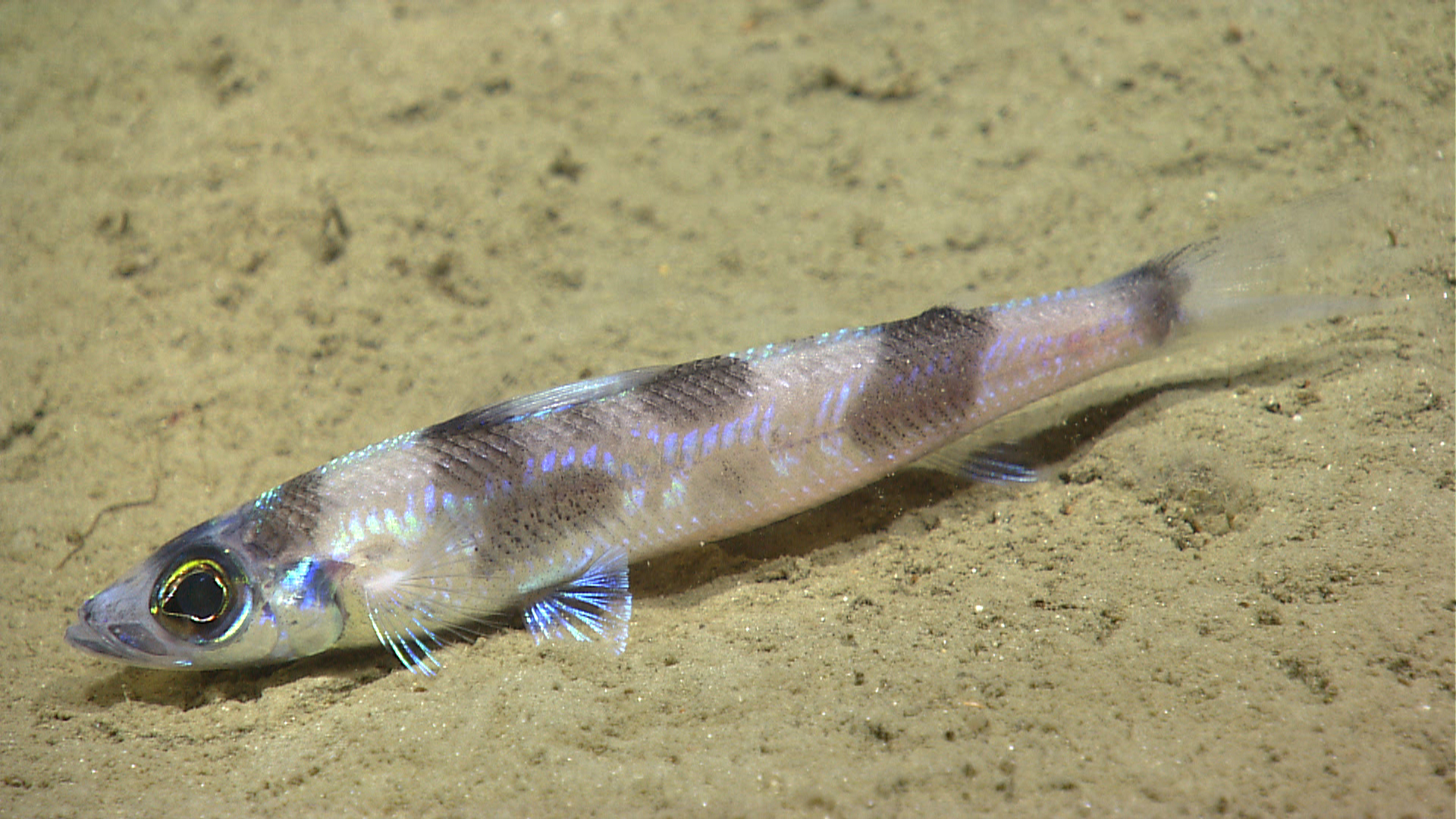
- Shortnose greeneye (C. agassizi)

Scientific classification
- Kingdom: Animalia
- Phylum: Chordata
- Class: Actinopterygii
- Division: Teleostei
- Order: Aulopiformes
- Suborder: Chlorophthalmoidei
- Family: Chlorophthalmidae; D. S. Jordan, 1923

Genera
- Chlorophthalmus Bonaparte, 1840; Parasudis Regan, 1911; †Omiodon Bassani, 1888; ?†Iniomus David, 1946

= Greeneye =

Greeneyes Temporal range: Early Eocene to present

Family of ray-finned fishes

Greeneyes are deep-sea aulopiform marine fishes in the small family Chlorophthalmidae. Thought to have a circumglobal distribution in tropical and temperate waters, the family contains just 18 species in two genera. The family name Chlorophthalmidae derives from the Greek words chloros meaning "green" and ophthalmos meaning "eye".

Some species are of interest to commercial and subsistence fisheries; the fish are made into fish meal or sold fresh.

The only known prehistoric member of this group is Omiodon, a stem-chlorophthalmid known from a complete fossil skeleton from the early Eocene of Italy.Acrognathus from the Cenomanian of England & Lebanon was previously classified in this family, but its classification into this family is now refuted due to its prominent scutes, which are not present on definite chlorophthalmids. Another potential fossil genus, Iniomus, is known from isolated scales from the Late Eocene of California.

== Description ==
Aptly named after their disproportionately large, iridescent (as well as fluorescent) eyes, greeneyes are slender fish with slightly compressed bodies. The largest species, the Shortnose greeneye (Chlorophthalmus agassizi) reaches a length of 40 cm (16 in), but most other species are much smaller. Their heads are small with large jaws. Their coloration ranges from a yellowish to blackish brown, and some species have cryptic blotches.

Their fins are simple and spineless; aside from their eyes, some species also have iridescent patches covering their heads.

== Behaviour and reproduction ==
Greeneyes are generally deepwater fish, found from 50 to 1,000 m (160 to 3,280 ft). They seem to prefer the continental slopes and shelves, possibly forming schools. Greeneyes are known to primarily feed on benthic invertebrates, as well as pelagic crustaceans such as decapods and mysids.

Like many aulopiform fish, greeneyes are hermaphroditic; this is thought to be a great advantage in deep-sea habitats, where the chances of running into a compatible mate are uncertain. Young and larval greeneyes are pelagic rather than benthic, staying within the upper levels of the water column. Hake are known predators of greeneyes.

== Classification ==
The genus Bathysauroides is sometimes classified with the greeneyes, but this article follows FishBase in placing it in its own family, Bathysauroididae.
