= Hime (surname) =

Hime is a surname. Notable people with the surname include:

- Albert Henry Hime (1842–1919), Irish Royal Engineers officer and politician
- Alan Hime (1929–1985), English swimmer
- Charles Hime (1869–1940), South African cricketer
- Ed Hime (born 1978), British playwright and screenwriter
- Francis Hime (born 1939), Brazilian composer, pianist and singer
- Gilbert Hime (1887–1957), Brazilian footballer
- Humphrey Lloyd Hime (1833–1903), Canadian photographer
- Olivia Hime (born 1943), Brazilian singer and lyricist
