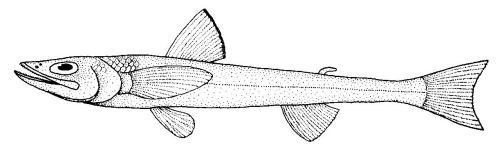
- Black lizardfish, B. gracilis

Scientific classification
- Kingdom: Animalia
- Phylum: Chordata
- Class: Actinopterygii
- Order: Aulopiformes
- Suborder: Chlorophthalmoidei
- Family: Bathysauropsidae; Tomoyasu Sato & Nakabo, 2002
- Genus: Bathysauropsis; Regan, 1911

= Bathysauropsis =

Genus of fishes

Bathysauropsis is the only genus in the lizard greeneye family, Bathysauropsidae, a group of deep-sea fishes.

== Species ==
The currently recognized species in this genus are:

- Bathysauropsis gracilis (Günther, 1878) (black lizardfish)
- Bathysauropsis malayanus (Fowler, 1938)
