= Bathysauroides =

Conservation status
- Least Concern (IUCN 3.1)

Scientific classification
- Kingdom: Animalia
- Phylum: Chordata
- Class: Actinopterygii
- Superorder: Cyclosquamata
- Order: Aulopiformes
- Family: Bathysauroididae; Sato & Nakabo, 2002
- Genus: Bathysauroides; Baldwin & Johnson, 1996
- Species: B. gigas

Binomial name
- Bathysauroides gigas (Kamohara, 1952)

Species of fish

Bathysauroides gigas, the pale deepsea lizardfish, is the only species in the family Bathysauroididae. This species is found in the western Pacific Ocean where it is so far only known from the waters around Japan and Australia. This species grows to 29 cm (11 in) in standard length.
