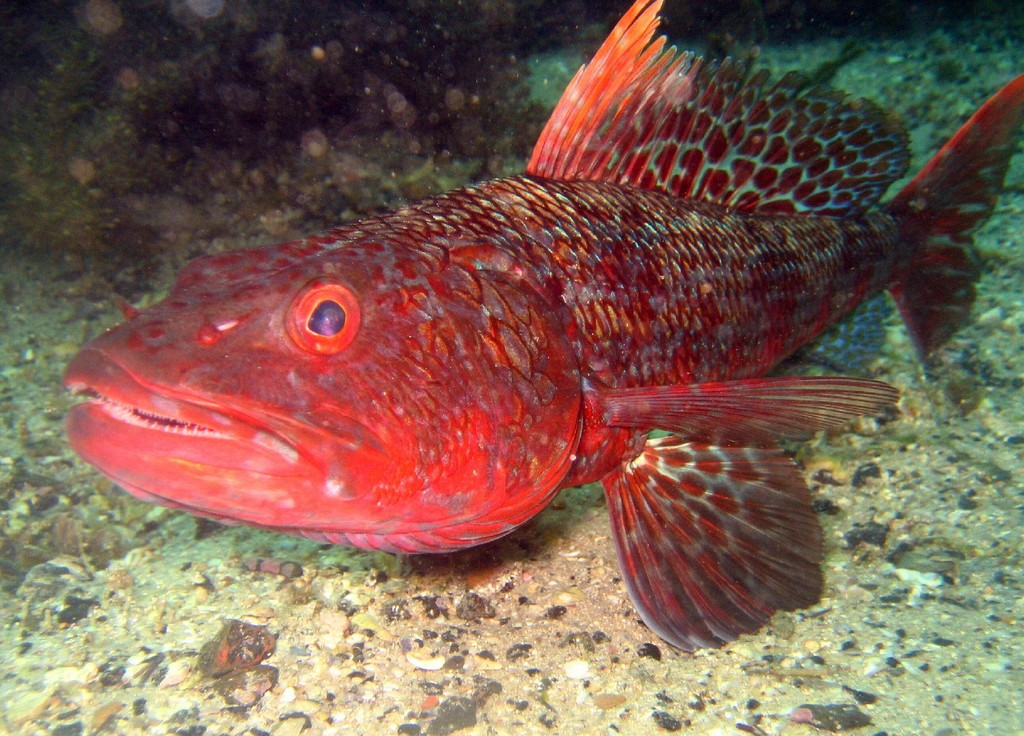
- A sergeant baker (Latropiscis purpurissatus)

Scientific classification
- Kingdom: Animalia
- Phylum: Chordata
- Class: Actinopterygii
- Division: Teleostei
- Order: Aulopiformes
- Suborder: Aulopoidei
- Family: Aulopidae; Cope, 1872

Genera
- Aulopus; Hime; Latropiscis; Leptaulopus

= Aulopidae =

Aulopidae Temporal range: Cenomanian–present, 96–0 Ma

Family of ray-finned fishes

The Aulopidae are a small family of aulopiform ray-finned fish. They are found in tropical and subtropical waters, including the Atlantic, Mediterranean, and Pacific. The aulopids are commonly known as flagfins.

The aulopids resemble lizardfishes in appearance, and range up to 60 cm (24 in) in length. They have large dorsal fins, the first ray of which is greatly extended. They are bottom-dwelling fish, living at depths of 1,000 m (3,300 ft).

The earliest known member of the group is Nematonotus from the Cenomanian of Lebanon.
