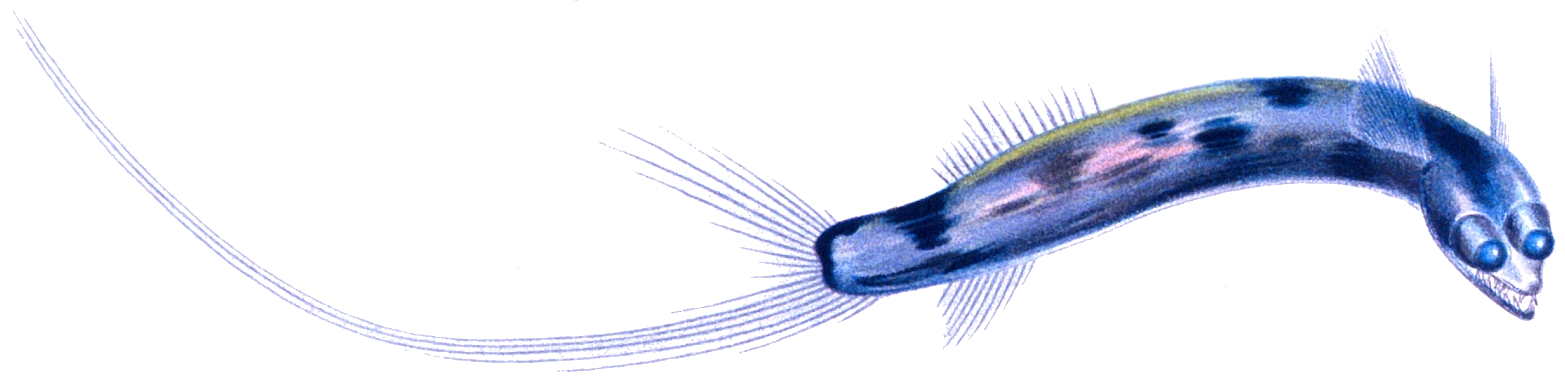
- Gigantura chuni

Scientific classification
- Kingdom: Animalia
- Phylum: Chordata
- Class: Actinopterygii
- Division: Teleostei
- Order: Aulopiformes
- Family: Giganturidae
- Genus: Gigantura; A. B. Brauer, 1901

= Telescopefish =

Genus of fishes

Telescopefish are small, deep-sea aulopiform fish classified in the small family Giganturidae. Telescopefish can be found at the depths of 2000 meters under water. The two species are within the genus Gigantura. Though rarely captured, they are found in cold, deep tropical to subtropical waters worldwide.

The common name of these fish is related to their bizarre, tubular eyes. The genus name Gigantura refers to the Gigantes, a race of giants in Greek mythology—coupled with the suffix oura, meaning 'tail', thus Gigantura refers to the greatly elongated, ribbon-like lower half of the tailfin that may account for over half of the total body length.

== Species ==
The currently recognized species in this genus are:

- Gigantura chuni A. B. Brauer, 1901 (gigantura)
- Gigantura indica A. B. Brauer, 1901 (telescopefish)

== Description ==
The Giganturidae are slender, slightly tapered fish with large heads dominated by large, forward-pointing, telescoping eyes with large lenses. Their heads end in short, pointed snouts. The highly extensile mouth is lined with sharp, slightly recurved and downward-flexing teeth and it extends well past the eyes. The body lacks scales, but is covered in easily abraded, silvery guanine, which gives them a greenish to purplish iridescence in life. The gas bladder is absent and the stomach is highly elastic.

The transparent fins are spineless; the deeply forked and hypocercal caudal fin has a lower lobe extended to a length exceeding that of the body. The pectoral fins are large (about 30–42 rays), situated above the gill opening, and positioned horizontally. The anal fin (about 8–14 rays) and the single dorsal fin (about 16–19 rays) are both situated far back of the head. The pelvic fins and adipose fin are absent.

Also absent are the premaxilla, orbitosphenoid, parietal, symplectic, posttemporal, and supratemporal bones, the gill rakers, and the branchiostegal rays. The loss of these structures is attributed to neoteny; that is, the retention of larval characteristics.

Gigantura indica is the larger of the two species at about 20.3 centimetres (8 in) standard length (a measurement excluding the caudal fin). However, Gigantura chuni (at about 15.6 centimetres (6.1 in) standard length) is slightly more robust in build. Both species within the genus have been recently observed in Australian waters and have a very similar species distribution.

== Life history ==
Telescopefish are presumed to be solitary, active predators, inhabiting the mesopelagic to bathypelagic zones of the water column from 500 to 3,000 metres (1,640 to 9,840 ft). By using their tubular, large-lensed eyes—which are adapted for optimal binocular light collection, at the expense of lateral vision—telescopefish are likely able to spy their prey's weak bioluminescence from a distance, as well as (by looking skyward) resolve the outlined silhouettes of prey against the gloom above. Their eyes may also help telescopefish to better judge distance of prey; these visual adaptations are typical of deep-sea fish (barrel-eye, tube-eye). Common prey include bristlemouths, lanternfish, and barbeled dragonfish. Owing to the telescopefishes' highly extensile jaws and distensible stomachs, they are able to swallow prey larger than themselves; this is also a common adaptation to life in the lean depths (sabertooth fish, black seadevil).

Telescopefish participate in the diel vertical migration in which mesopelagic fish migrate to the surface at night to feed before returning to the depths to shelter during the day.

Little is known of their reproductive habits. They are presumed to be nonguarding pelagic spawners, releasing eggs and sperm indiscriminately into the water. The fertilized eggs are buoyant and become incorporated into the zooplankton, wherein they and the larvae remain—likely at much shallower depths than the adults—until metamorphosis into juvenile or adult form.

== See also ==
- List of fish families
- List of fish common names
