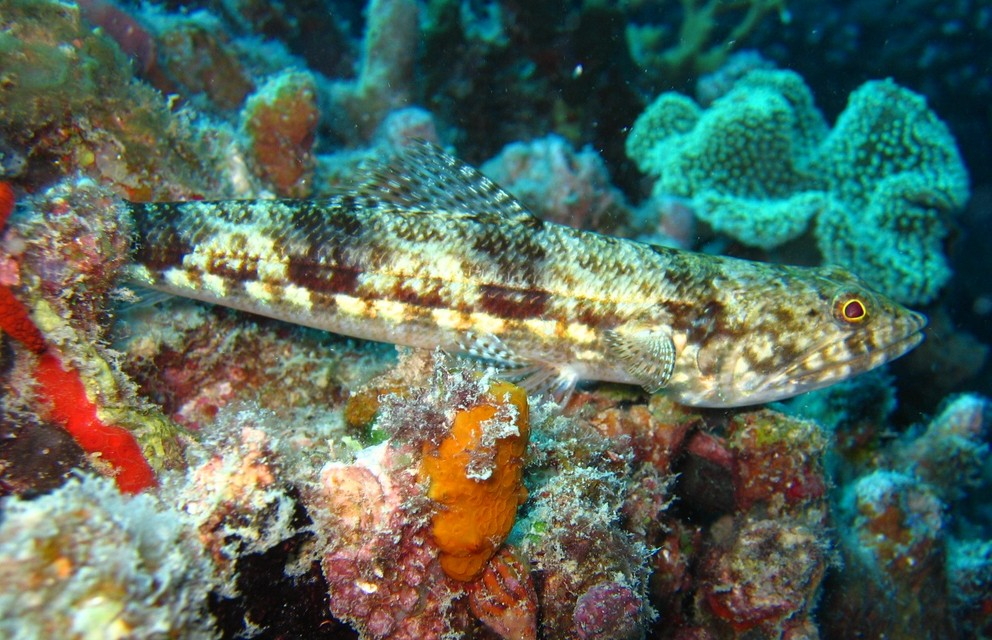
- Variegated lizardfish, Synodus variegatus (Synodontoidei: Synodontidae)

Scientific classification
- Kingdom: Animalia
- Phylum: Chordata
- Class: Actinopterygii
- Clade: Eurypterygii
- Superorder: Cyclosquamata
- Order: Aulopiformes; D. E. Rosen, 1973

Type genus
- Aulopus Cloquet, 1816

Suborders
- Alepisauroidei; †Enchodontoidei; Giganturoidei; Synodontoidei; Aulopoidei

Synonyms
- Macristiidae (see text)

= Aulopiformes =

Aulopiformes Temporal range: 125–0 Ma Early Cretaceous to present

Order of fishes

Aulopiformes /ˈɔːləpɪfɔːrmiːz/ (Note: Meaning "Aulopus-shaped", from Aulopus (the type genus) + the standard fish order suffix "-formes"; this ultimately derives from Ancient Greek aulós (αὐλός, "flute" or "pipe") + Latin forma ("external form"), the former in reference to the elongated shape of many aulopiforms.) is a diverse order of marine ray-finned fish consisting of some 15 extant and several prehistoric families with about 45 genera and over 230 species. The common names grinners, lizardfishes and allies, or aulopiforms are sometimes used for this group. They are included in the superorder Cyclosquamata, (Note: cyclō + squāmātus; "circle scale", referring to the cycloid scales predominant in these fish) though modern taxonomists consider this superorder to be unwarranted.

Many extant aulopiforms are deep-sea fishes, with some species recognized as being hermaphroditic, a number of which are able to self-fertilise. Some are benthic, but most are pelagic swimmers (nektonic). A clade of Aulopiformes, the suborder Enchodontoidei and its many constituent families, were dominant nektonic fish throughout much of the Late Cretaceous before the extinction of most of their members around the K–Pg event, with the Dercetidae surviving for some time in the Cenozoic.

== Taxonomy ==
Past authors have considered aulopiforms to be so distinct as to warrant separation in a monotypic superorder of the Teleostei, the Cyclosquamata. However, monotypic taxa are generally avoided by modern taxonomists if not necessary, and in this case a distinct superorder seems indeed unwarranted: together with the equally dubious superorder "Stenopterygii", the grinners appear to be closely related to some of the Protacanthopterygii, namely, the Salmoniformes (salmon, trout, and relatives), and should perhaps be part of that larger clade. As an alternative, the superorders are sometimes united as an unranked clade named Euteleostei, but in that case the Protacanthopterygii would need to be split further to account for the phylogenetic uncertainty. This would result in a highly cumbersome and taxonomically redundant group of two very small and no less than four monotypic superorders.

== Description ==
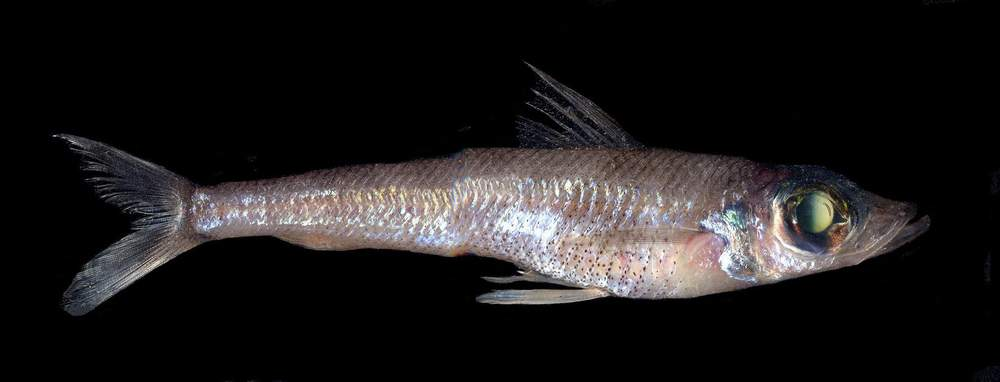
A shortnose greeneye, Chlorophthalmus agassizi (Chlorophthalmoidei: Chlorophthalmidae)

In general, aulopiform fish have a mixture of advanced and primitive characteristics relative to other teleost fish. Aulopiformes are grouped together (claded) because of common features in the structure of their gill arches; their second pharyngobranchial bone (part of the gill arch) is greatly elongated posterolaterally away from third pharyngobranchial, which lacks a cartilaginous condyle to articulate with the preceding bone, but is contacted by the elongated uncinate process of the second epibranchial. Aulopiforms have a gas bladder which is either vestigial or entirely absent, a hypaxialis muscle that is unusually extended forward at its upper end, attaching to the neurocranium below the spine (perhaps to snap the upper part of the skull down when catching prey), and the position of the maxillary bone. Other features include the position of the pelvic fins far back on the body, the fused medial processes of pelvic girdle, and the presence of an adipose fin (which is also typical for the Protacanthopterygii).

The larvae of some Aulopiformes are extremely bizarre-looking, with elongated fins, and do not resemble the adult animals. They were not only described as distinct species, but also even separated as genera and finally in a family "Macristiidae" which was allied with various Protacanthopterygii (sensu lato), but the initial assessment – which found "Macristium" to resemble the deepwater lizardfishes (Bathysauridae) in some details – was in fact not far off the mark: "Macristium" species are now known to be the larvae of Bathysaurus, while the supposed other "macristiids" "Macristiella spp." are larvae of the deepsea tripodfish Bathytyphlops.

Several extant aulopiform families have Cretaceous representatives, and phylogenetic evidence indicates that the extant families of the order diversified around the Early Cretaceous, making it rather ancient. These diversification events included the earliest adaptations for deep-sea living, which is common among many extant aulopiform taxa. Below is a timeline indicating fossil evidence for the group:

== Classification ==
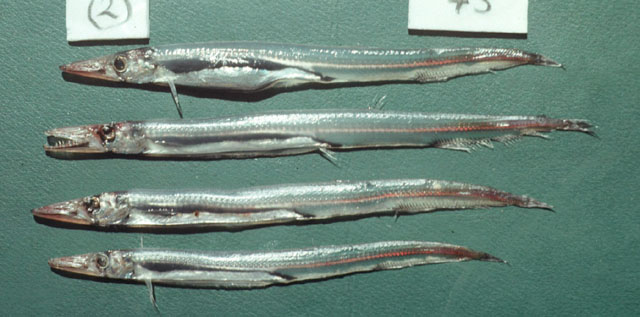
Lestrolepis japonica (Alepisauroidei: Paralepididae)

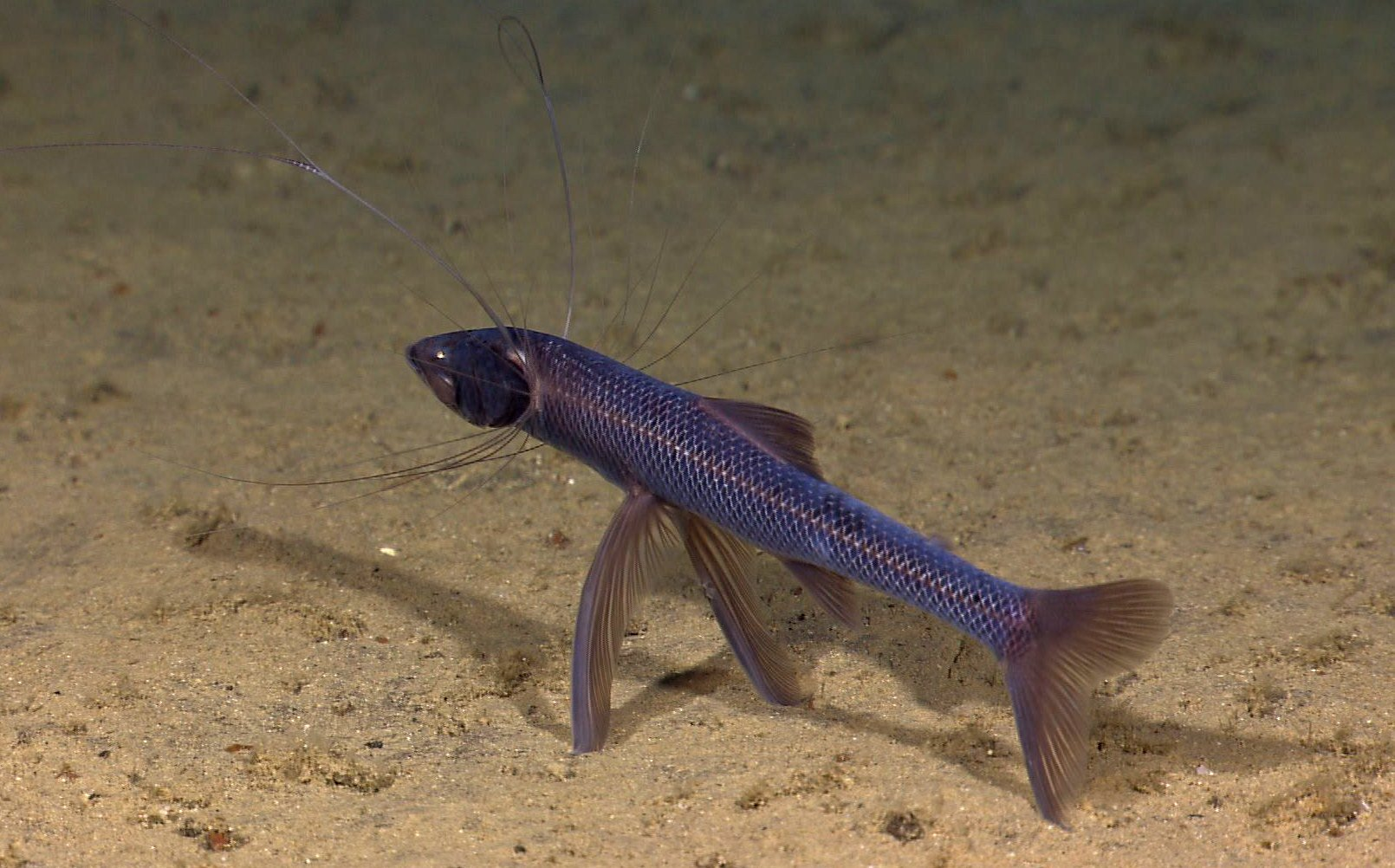
Tripodfish; Bathypterois sp. (Chlorophthalmoidei: Ipnopidae)

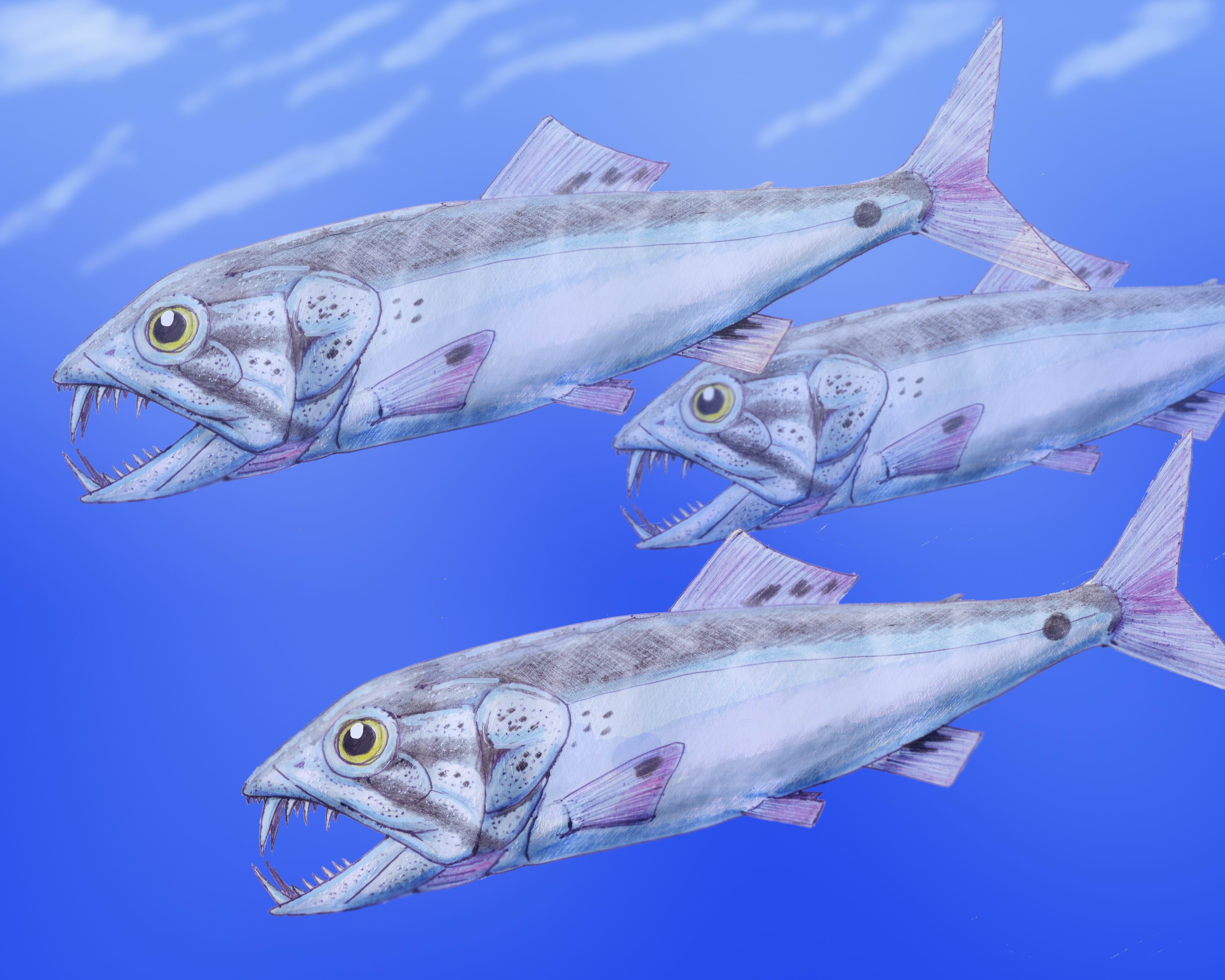
Enchodus petrosus, reconstruction (Enchodontoidei: Enchodontidae)

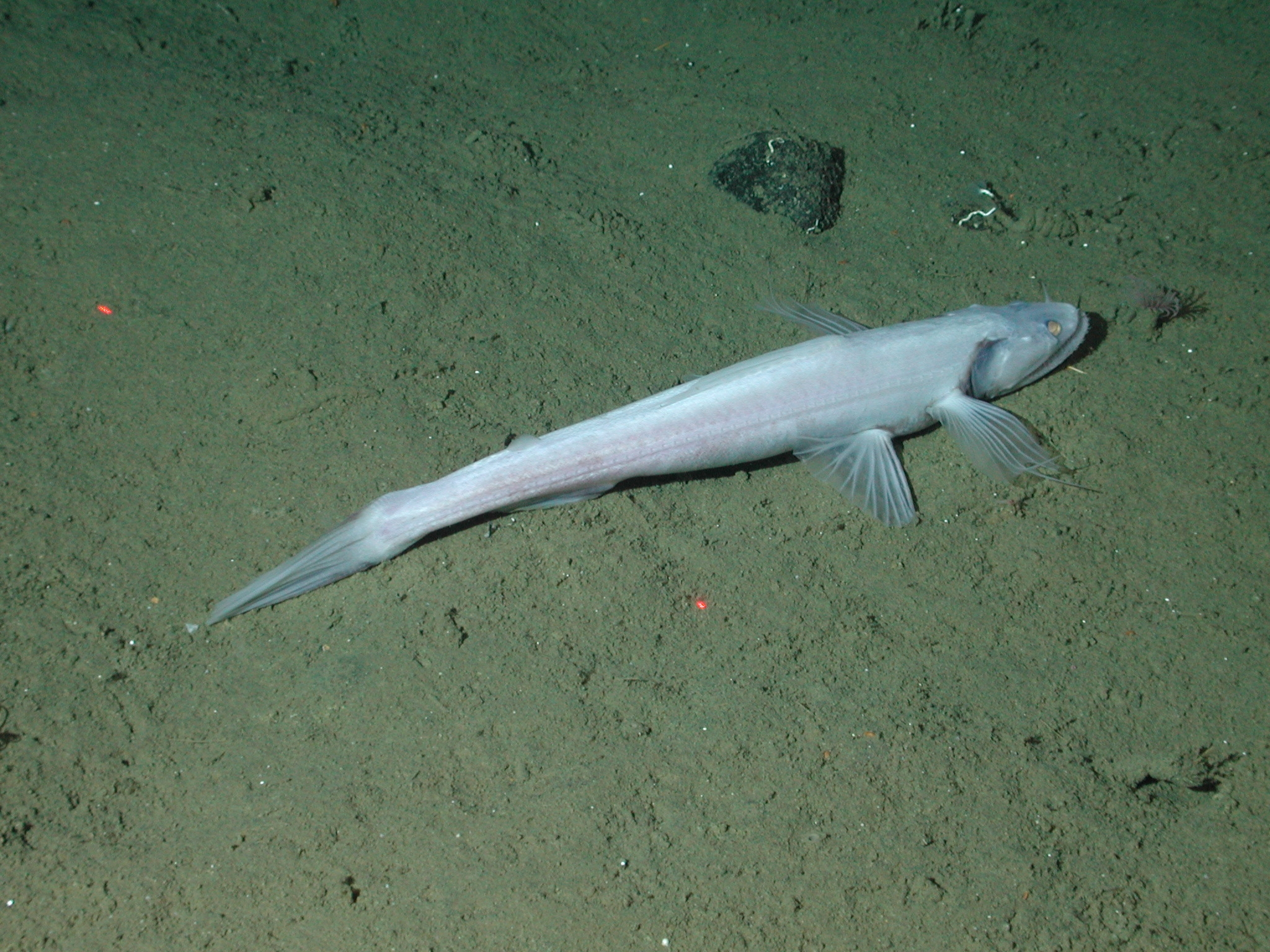
Highfin lizardfish; Bathysaurus mollis (Giganturoidei: Bathysauridae)

- Suborder Synodontoidei
  - Family Synodontidae – typical lizardfishes
- Suborder Aulopoidei
  - Family Pseudotrichonotidae – sandliving lizardfishes, sand-diving lizardfishes
  - Family Aulopidae – flagfins
  - Family Harpadontidae – Bombay ducks
- Suborder Paraulopoidei
  - Family Paraulopidae – "cucumberfishes
- Suborder Alepisauroidei
  - Family Ipnopidae – deepsea tripodfishes (includes Bathysauropsidae)
  - Family Giganturidae – telescopefishes
  - Family Bathysauroididae – pale deepsea lizardfish
  - Family Bathysauridae – deepwater lizardfishes
  - Family Chlorophthalmidae – greeneyes
  - Family Notosudidae – waryfishes
  - Family Scopelarchidae – pearleyes
  - Family Evermannellidae – sabertooth fishes
  - Family Paralepididae – barracudinas
  - Family Anotopteridae – daggertooths (may belong in Paralepididae)
  - Family Alepisauridae – lancetfishes
  - Family Omosudidae – hammerjaw (sometimes included in Alepisauridae)
  - Family †Polymerichthyidae – an extinct alepisauroid closely related to the daggertooths and lancetfish
- Suborder †Enchodontoidei (including Halecoidei, Ichthyotringoidei, may belong in Alepisauroidei; fossil)
  - Genus †Nardorex (fossil, tentatively placed here)
  - Genus †Serrilepis (fossil, tentatively placed here)
  - Genus †Yabrudichthys (fossil, tentatively placed here)
  - Family †Apateopholidae (fossil)
  - Family †Cimolichthyidae (fossil)
  - Family †Dercetidae (fossil)
  - Family †Enchodontidae (fossil)
  - Family †Eurypholidae (fossil)
  - Family †Halecidae (fossil)
  - Family †Ichthyotringidae (fossil)
  - Family †Prionolepididae (fossil)
- Suborder incertae sedis
  - ?Family †Cheirothricidae (fossil, generally considered indeterminate eurypterygians)
  - Genus †Aulopopsis (fossil)

† means extinct.
