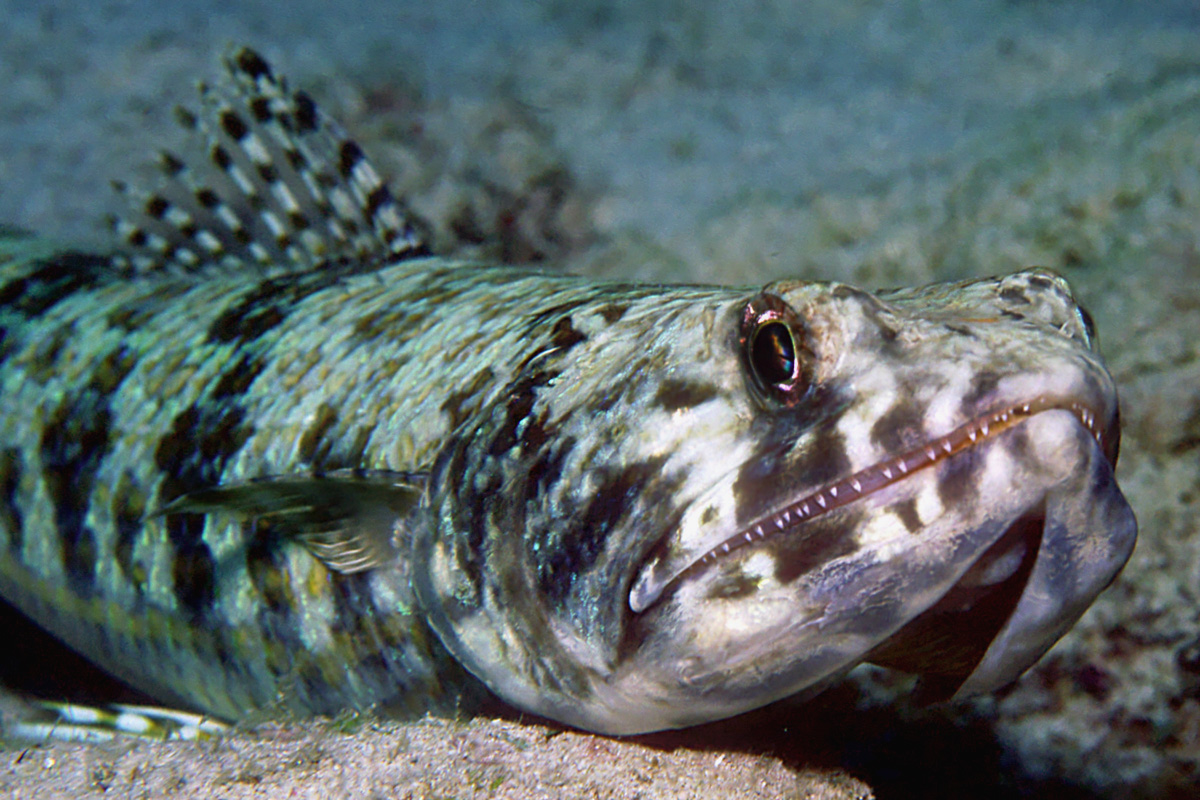

Scientific classification
- Kingdom: Animalia
- Phylum: Chordata
- Class: Actinopterygii
- Order: Aulopiformes
- Family: Synodontidae
- Genus: Synodus
- Species: S. intermedius

Binomial name
- Synodus intermedius (Spix & Agassiz, 1829)

Synonyms
- Saurus intermedius Spix & Agassiz, 1829; Synodus intermidius (Spix & Agassiz, 1829)

= Synodus intermedius =

Species of fish

Synodus intermedius, the common sand diver, is a species of fish in the lizardfish family, the Synodontidae, a basal ray-finned fish in the class Actinopterygii. Sand divers inhabit subtropical marine ecosystems, (37-17°N), including sandy- bottom areas on continental shelves, coral reefs, estuaries, bays, and reef structures. They are demersal or benthic fish, which means they live on or close to the sea bed. Distribution ranges from the northern Gulf of Mexico south to the Guianas, and western Atlantic north to North Carolina and Bermuda. They are a common lizardfish in the West Indies. They grow to about 40 cm (16 in) total length, and weigh around 1 kg (2.2 lb).

The trunk of sand divers is a pallid color, ranging from gray to brownish gray with mottling on the head and trunk grading to a whitish underbelly. They have variable markings, including a black patch on the shoulder girdle, reddish-brown vertical bars across the back, and thin yellow-gold striped lateral lines running from behind the gill flap or operculum to the base of the tail or caudal fin. They are able to alter their color, becoming paler or darker to blend with the background.

== Etymology ==
The etymology of Synodus is of Greek origin: syn, symphysis or grown together, and odous, which means teeth. The common English name for the species is "sand diver" and for the genus "lizardfishes". In French, the fish is named anoli de sable and in Spanish it is known under various names, such as chile manchado, doncella, guaripete, guavina, lagarto gigante, lagarto mato, lagarto manchado, or manuelito.

== Taxonomy and evolution ==
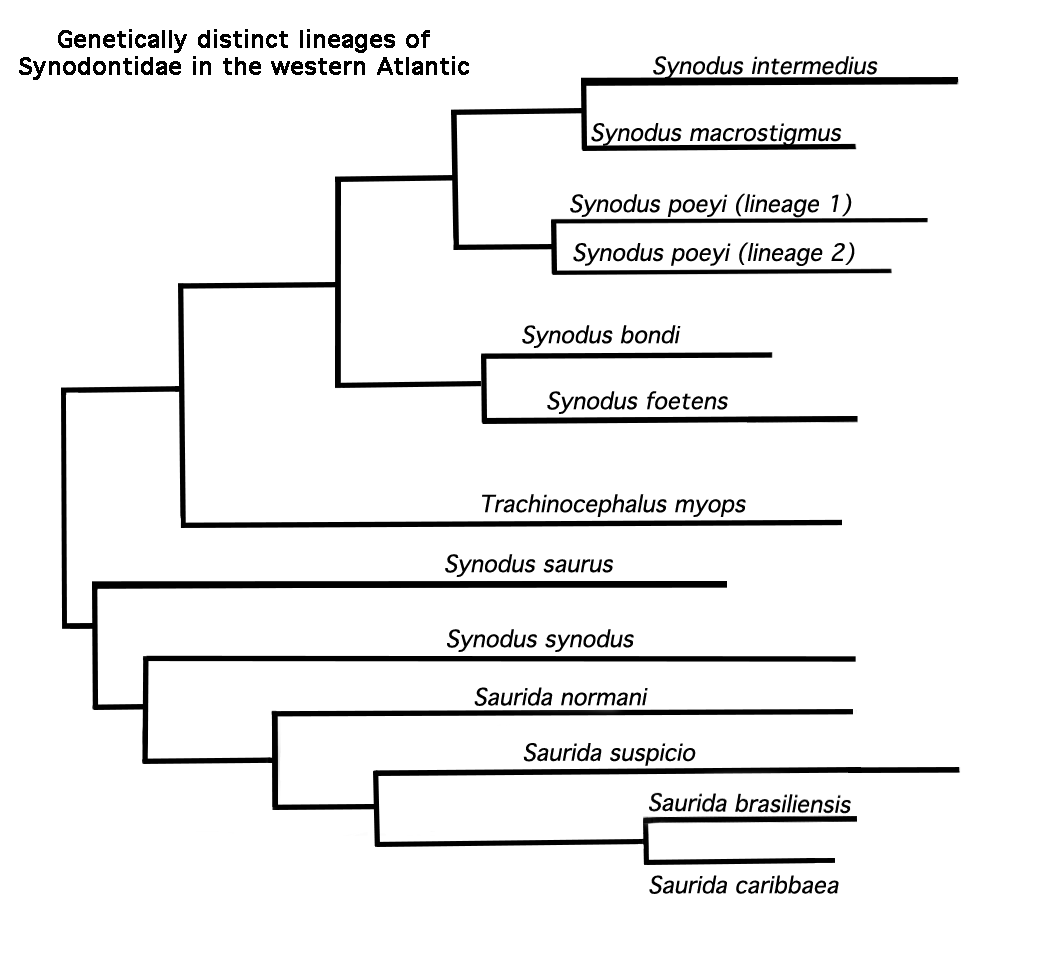
Genetically distinct lineages of the Synodontidae in the western Atlantic, rendition from Frable et al.

Lizardfishes are aulopiforms in the family Synodontidae, which is represented in the western Atlantic by three genera: Synodus, comprising six species, Saurida, comprising four species, and Trachinocephalus which includes a single species.

The fossil record indicates an evolutionary divergence of the Aulopidae dating back to the Early Cretaceous or Late Jurassic, with most extant families appearing by the Late Cretaceous to the Eocene. Aulopoids are a small group of benthic fishes that inhabit coral reefs and continental shelves, including lizardfishes (Synodus, Saurida) and flagfin fishes (Aulopus). Integrated studies regarding deep-sea evolutionary adaptations, simultaneous hermaphroditism, and tubular eyes suggest that the stem species of lizardfishes arose in a marine environment with separate sexes, and round eyes that were laterally directed. The study also identified the suborder Alepisauroidei as the largest and oldest known vertebrae clade with the reproductive strategy of simultaneous hermaphroditism.

== Description ==
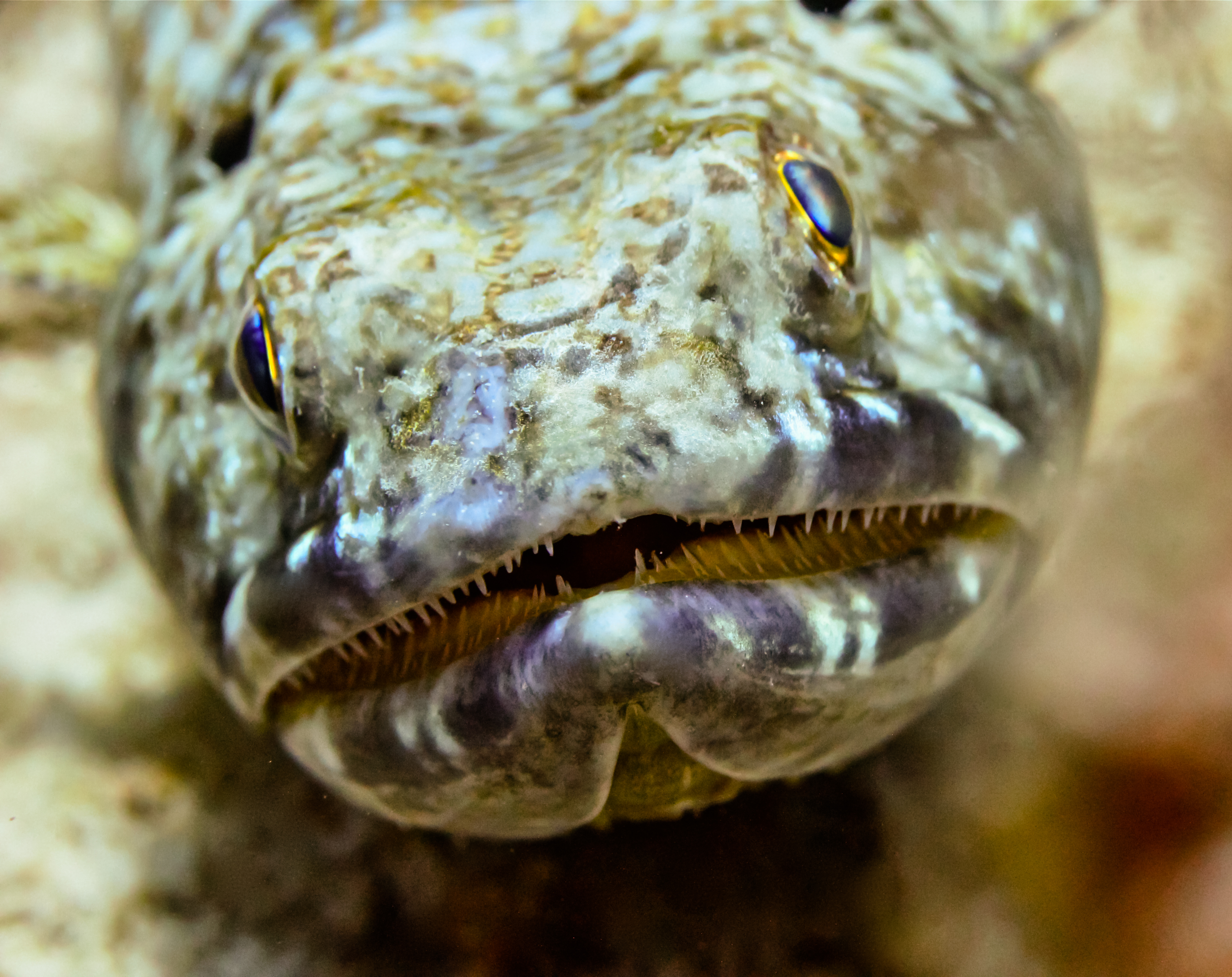
S. intermedius has a wide mouth with numerous needlelike teeth.

Sand divers have an elongated body and can grow to 46 cm (18 in) long. The dorsal (upper) surface is dappled brownish-gray and a black patch occurs on the shoulder girdle at the upper end of the gill slits. About eight pairs of reddish-brown bars are on the top and sides of the body, broadest at the lateral line and narrowing towards the belly. Also, slender yellowish-gold longitudinal lines run along the body. The ventral (under) surface of the fish is pale. The tip of the lower jaw is rounded, without a fleshy knob, and the soft rays of the dorsal fin are relatively short, the tip of the front one lying on top of the origin of the hind one when depressed. These characteristics help to distinguish this species from the offshore lizardfish (S. poeyi). The anal fin of the sand diver has 10-12 soft rays which distinguish it from the otherwise similar diamond lizardfish (S. synodus) which has eight to 10. Another fish with which it might be confused is the Atlantic lizardfish (S. saurus), but that species is uncommon in the Caribbean and has slender, blue or turquoise longitudinal lines.

As is common among benthic and demersal fish, the cornea of the eye has an iridescent layer, the function of which may be to offer protection to the eye from very bright light. The mouth is wide and filled with numerous needlelike teeth. Two rows of teeth are in the upper jaw; the inner row teeth are longer than the outer row. Three rows of teeth are on the lower jaw; the outer row is covered by lips, the middle teeth increase in size. Both jaws have posterior teeth that slant slightly toward the back. Also, three or four rows of depressible teeth exist on the palate. The tongue has five rows of teeth, the largest positioned closest to the anterior tip, slanting toward the back.

== Distribution and habitat ==
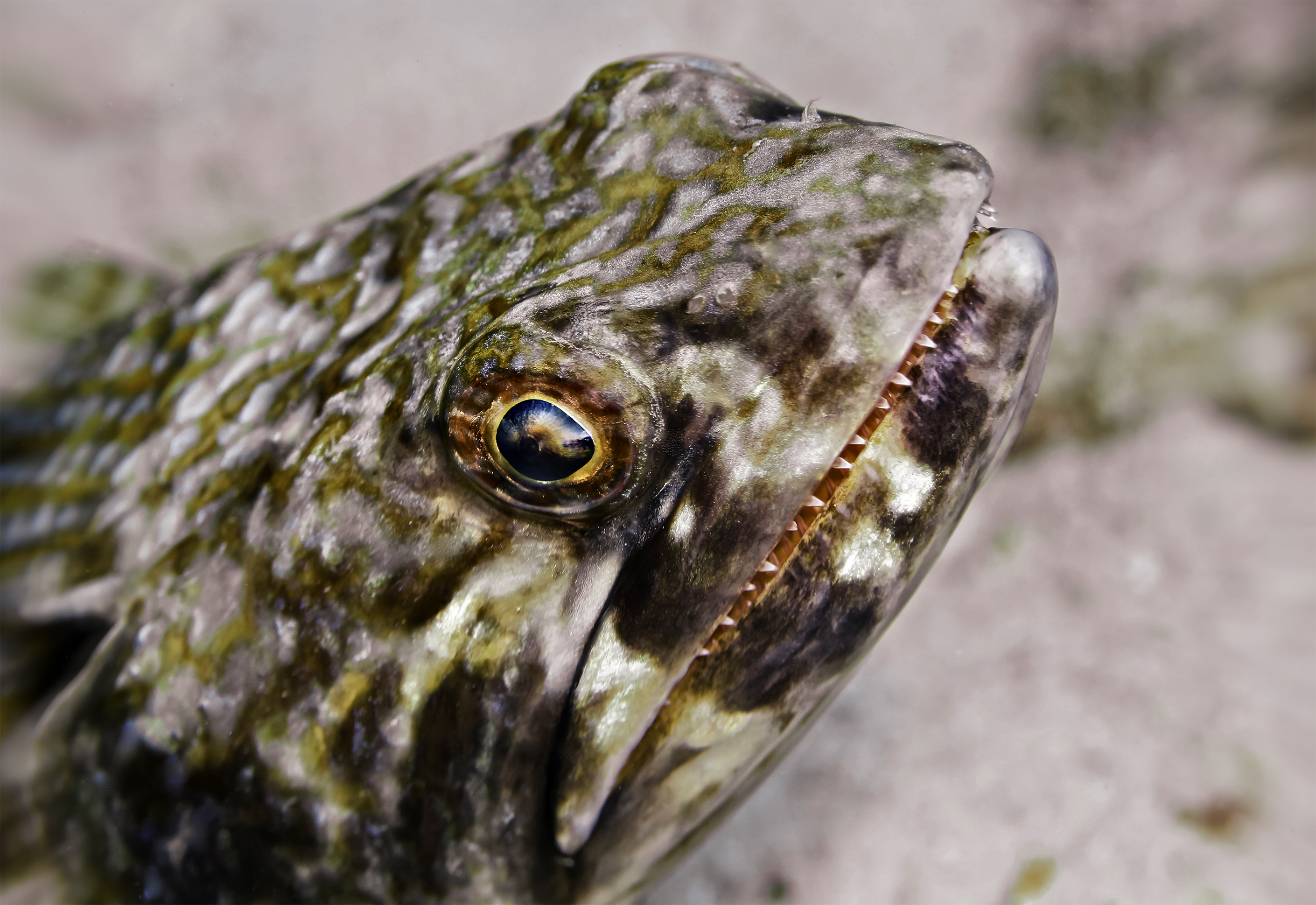
At Bari Reef in the Caribbean

Sand divers are found in the subtropical western Atlantic Ocean between 37 and 17°N, the Caribbean Sea, and the Gulf of Mexico. Their range extends from North Carolina and Bermuda, southwards to Santa Catarina in Brazil, and includes the West Indies, Caribbean Sea and northern, eastern, and southern Gulf of Mexico. They have been reported from São Tomé and Príncipe in the eastern Atlantic, though that record is questionable, and are also known from the Philippines. Sand divers are usually found on or near the seabed in sandy areas among boulders or in sandy corridors in reefs, but they also rest on the tops of reef structures, propping themselves up on their pectoral fins. They are found at depths down to 320 m (1,050 ft), but they seldom occur near shore and most records are in the depth range 38 to 110 m (125 to 361 ft). Divers also record seeing these at depths of 20 to 80 feet in the reef of Bonaire.

== Ecology ==
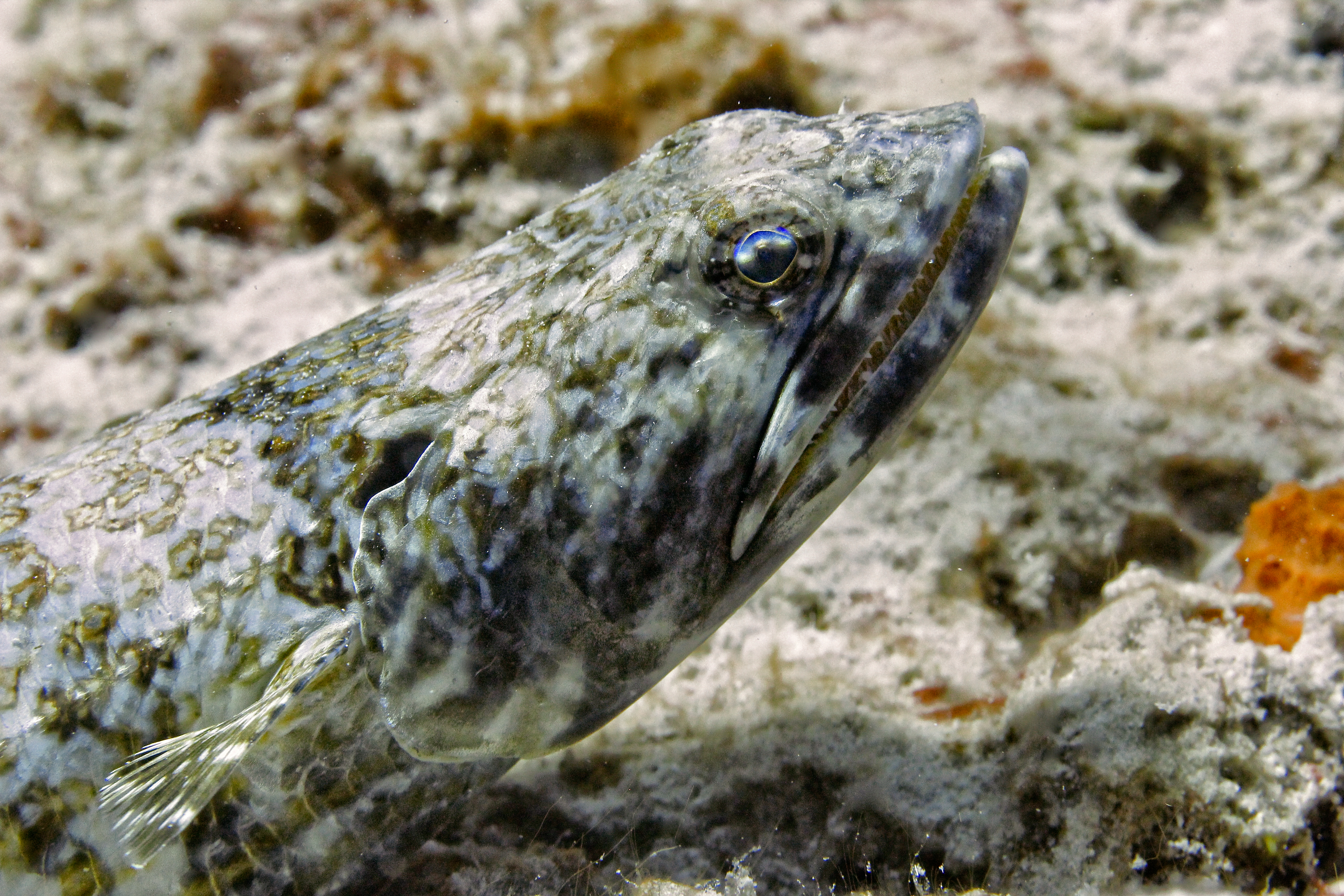
S. intermedius on Bari Reef, Bonaire

Sand divers are piscivorous ambush predators once thought to occupy a midtrophic position as a lie-in-wait predator. They occupy a high trophic position as active hunters that feed on other predatory fishes. In some systems, they are considered apex predators. They can be found on top of the sand or on reef tops, and also bury themselves in the sand with only their heads exposed. Sand divers feed primarily on finfish and bony fish (such as bar jacks, wrasses, small grunts, and silversides), but also feed on benthic crustaceans, and cephalopods including squid and cuttlefish.
