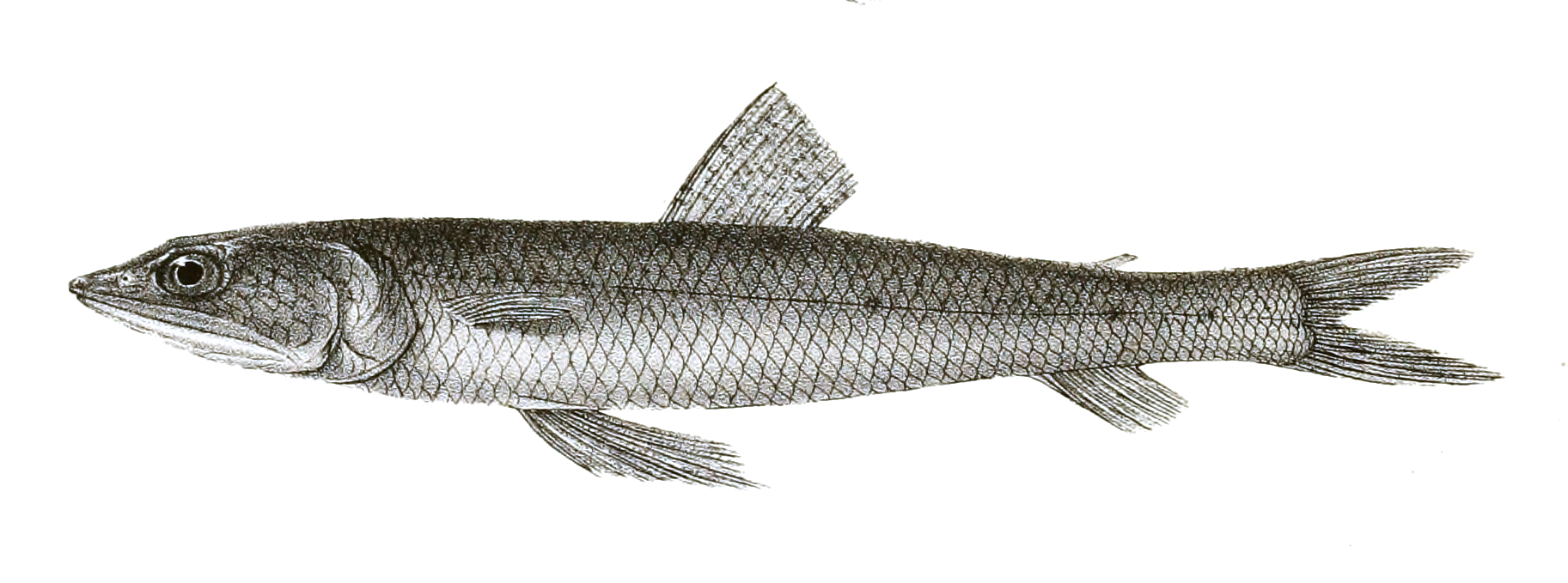

Conservation status
- Least Concern (IUCN 3.1)

Scientific classification
- Kingdom: Animalia
- Phylum: Chordata
- Class: Actinopterygii
- Division: Teleostei
- Order: Aulopiformes
- Family: Synodontidae
- Genus: Synodus
- Species: S. indicus

Binomial name
- Synodus indicus (F. Day, 1873)

Synonyms
- Saurus indicus F. Day, 1873; Synodus dietrichi Kotthaus, 1967

= Indian lizardfish =

Species of fish

The Indian lizardfish (Synodus indicus) is a species of marine ray-finned fish belonging to the family Synodontidae, the lizardfishes. This fish has a wide Indo-West Pacific distribution.

== Taxonomy ==
The Indian lizardfish was first formally described as Saurus indicus in 1873 by the British army surgeon and naturalist Francis Day with its type locality given as Madras in India. This species is now classified in the genus Synodus which is the type genus of the family Synodontidae which is the only family in the monotypic suborder Synodontoidei of the order Aulopiformes.

== Etymology ==
The Indian lizardfish is a member of the genus Synodus, which is an Ancient Greek name for a kind of marine fish and which is tautonym of the type species of the genus S. synodus. The specific name, indica means "belonging to India", where the type locality of Madras is located..

== Description ==
The Indian lizardfish has an elongated body which reaches a total length of 33 cm (13 in), although 12 cm (4.7 in) is more typical. The dorsal fin has 11 to 13 soft rays while the anal fin has 9 to 11 soft rays. The body is greyish pink on the back amrked with light bluish-grey blotches and stripes with 2 streaks at the upper margin of the operculum. The caudal fin is yellow with a few dark blotches along the lateral line.

== Distribution and habitat ==
The Indian lizardfish occura in the Indo-West Pacific, southern Red Sea, East Africa, southern India and Sri Lanka. It has been recorded from the Philippines and occurs in Indonesia and northwestern Australia. This species is reef-associated and is foun at depths between 20 and 100 m (66 and 328 ft). This species is native to a tropical climate. They are found in areas of sandy or muddy bottoms of waters that are prone to currents. This species is known to bury itself in the sand.

== Commercial use ==
The Indian lizardfish is sold both fresh and dried and salted in markets. This species is bred in fisheries for human commercial uses.

== Threats ==
S. indicus is not a threat to humans.
