= Synodus isolatus =

Rapanui lizardfish

Conservation status
- Least Concern (IUCN 3.1)

Scientific classification
- Kingdom: Animalia
- Phylum: Chordata
- Class: Actinopterygii
- Order: Aulopiformes
- Family: Synodontidae
- Genus: Synodus
- Species: S. isolatus

Binomial name
- Synodus isolatus Randall, 2009

Species of lizardfish

Synodus isolatus, the Rapa Nui lizardfish (Rapa Nui: pāpa hakatara), is a species of small lizardfish that is endemic to the shallow waters of the southern Pacific Ocean around Easter Island.

== Taxonomy and nomenclature ==
The Rapa Nui lizardfish was first observed by Charles Henry Gilbert in the 19th century and was described as Synodus lacertinus. Later studies referred them to as belonging to the species Synodus doaki, which also occurs in the southwestern Pacific Ocean. In 2009, American ichthyologist John Ernest Randall classified the Rapa Nui lizardfish as a separate species, Synodus isolatus. The holotype for this species, BPM 39162, was collected at a depth of 10 m (33 ft) near Motu Tautara off the west coast of Rapa Nui and is housed at the Bishop Museum in Honolulu, Hawaii.

== Description ==
The Rapa Nui lizardfish's dorsal fin usually has 14 or 15 soft rays, while the anal fin has 9 or 10, and the pectoral fins have 12 to 14. The lateral line system is usually made up of 57 to 59 scales, which closely mirrors the number of vertebrae (59 or 60). There are also scales present behind the mouth. Inside the mouth, the anterior palatine teeth are longer than those on the posterior of the palate. In other lizardfishes, peritoneal spots are often used to differentiate species, however S. isolatus has been reported to have anywhere between 1 and 8 spots. This variation has been used to suggest that peritoneal spots may not be as useful tools for differentiating lizardfish species as previously thought.

== Distribution and habitat ==
Despite being generally observed in the shallows, the Rapa Nui lizardfish's habitat spans a broad range of depths ranging between 10–250 m (33–820 ft). When observed at a depth of 150 m (490 ft), the fish appeared to prefer rocky and sandy bottoms. Individuals collected from deeper depths tend to show a distinct reddish color, but otherwise possess the same features as shallower-dwelling members of the species. Fishes from Easter Island usually tend to be depth-tolerant, which may be due to the low species diversity in this area and the limited amount of geographic space for shallow-adapted fishes to occupy.

== Relationship with humans ==
The Rapa Nui lizardfish was last assessed by the IUCN in 2015 and was found to be of Least Concern. Its population does not appear to be falling, and it may occur in protected areas such as Easter Island Marine Park. The species is not utilized for human consumption, however it is sometimes caught accidentally by anglers or as by-catch from shrimp trawling. Most suggestions to improve any conservation concerns for this species center the netting used in trawling, though Randall wrote that individuals were more likely to be caught with a hook and line in 2009 and 2011, and collected the holotype specimen with a spear.
