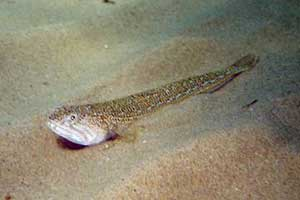
- Synodus saurus

Scientific classification
- Domain: Eukaryota
- Kingdom: Animalia
- Phylum: Chordata
- Class: Actinopterygii
- Order: Aulopiformes
- Family: Synodontidae
- Subfamily: Synodontinae

Genera
- See text

= Synodontinae =

Synodontinae Temporal range: Ypresian to Holocene

Subfamily of fishes

Synodontinae is a subfamily of lizardfishes in the family Synodontidae.

It comprises two extant genera, and one extinct genus:

- Synodus, fossil material known from Miocene-aged strata
- Trachinocephalus
- Argillichthys, known only from a skull, from the Ypresian of England
