= Synodus randalli =

Scientific classification
- Kingdom: Animalia
- Phylum: Chordata
- Class: Actinopterygii
- Division: Teleostei
- Order: Aulopiformes
- Family: Synodontidae
- Genus: Synodus
- Species: S. randalli

Binomial name
- Synodus randalli Cressey, 1981

Species of fish

Synodus randalli is a species of lizardfish that lives mainly in the Western Indian Ocean and the Red Sea.

== Information ==
Synodus randalli can be found in a marine environment within a benthopelagic range. This species is native to a tropical climate. Synodus randalli have an average length of 11.3 centimeters or 4.4 inches as an unsexed male. They live in salt water systems.

== Notes ==
- Froese, Rainer; Pauly, Daniel (eds.). "Synodus randalli". FishBase. April 2012 version.
