= Synodus orientalis =

Scientific classification
- Kingdom: Animalia
- Phylum: Chordata
- Class: Actinopterygii
- Order: Aulopiformes
- Family: Synodontidae
- Genus: Synodus
- Species: S. orientalis

Binomial name
- Synodus orientalis J. E. Randall & Pyle, 2008

Species of fish

Synodus orientalis is a species of lizardfish that lives mainly in the Northwest Pacific Ocean.

== Description ==
This species can reach the average length of about 23.4 cm (9.2 in) as an unsexed male.

== Distribution and habitat ==
Synodus orientalis can be found in a marine environment within a benthopelagic range. Their depth range is anywhere between 2 and 32 meters. They are native to a tropical climate in areas of Asia, such as Japan and Taiwan.

== Notes ==
- Froese, Rainer; Pauly, Daniel (eds.). "Synodus orientalis". FishBase. April 2012 version.
