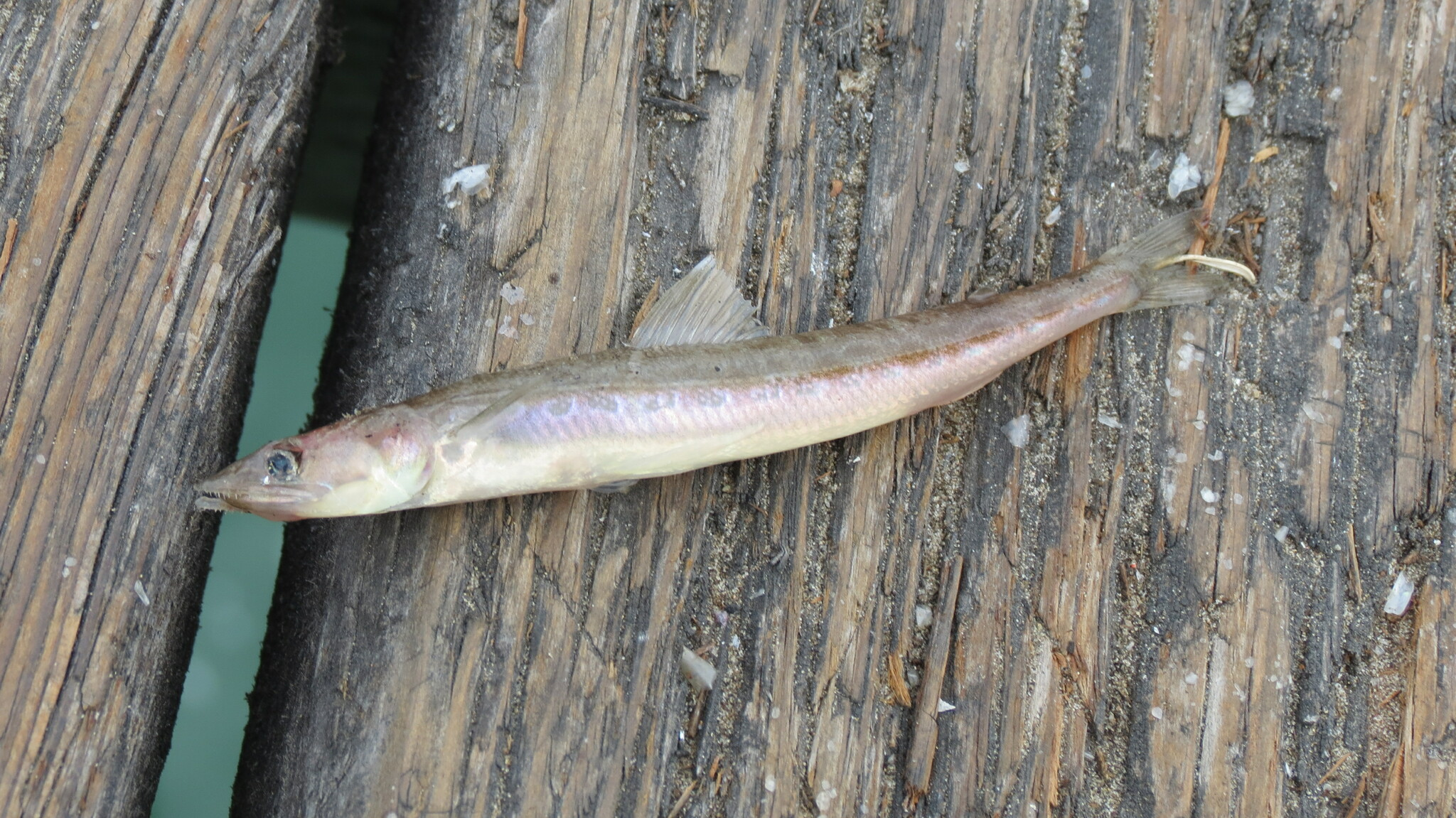

Conservation status
- Least Concern (IUCN 3.1)

Scientific classification
- Kingdom: Animalia
- Phylum: Chordata
- Class: Actinopterygii
- Order: Aulopiformes
- Family: Synodontidae
- Genus: Synodus
- Species: S. lucioceps

Binomial name
- Synodus lucioceps (Ayres, 1855)

Synonyms
- Saurus lucioceps Ayres, 1855

= California lizardfish =

Species of fish

The California lizardfish (Synodus lucioceps) is a species of lizardfish primarily inhabiting the Californian coast. It has a long, brown body, which offers it camouflage in its habitat, the sandy bottom of the ocean. From its hiding spot on the bottom it ambushes small fish and squid. California lizardfish are oviparous and are believed to spawn in the summer months.

== Description ==
The California lizardfish derives its name from its elongated cylindrical body and lizard-like head and mouth. The body is uniformly brown on its back, with its sides fading to tan and a white belly. It has a dorsal fin at its midback, no spinous fin rays, a small adipose fin, yellowish pelvic fins ahead of its dorsal fin with about eight or nine rays each, and a forked caudal fin. The longest fish recorded was 25.17 inches (63.9 cm) long, and may weigh up to 4 pounds (1.8 kg).

Because of its long body and sharp teeth, the California lizardfish is occasionally mistaken for the barracuda. The barracuda, however, is silvery rather than brown and has two similar-sized dorsal fins with a wide space between them, whereas the lizardfish only has a single dorsal fin with a tiny fleshy fin behind it.

== Range ==
The California lizardfish occurs from Guaymas, Mexico to San Francisco, California. Some specimens have even been found as far north as British Columbia, Canada and as far south as the Galapagos Islands. Although it is most commonly found on sandy bottoms in shallow water ranging from 5 to 150 feet deep, specimens have been found at depths up to 750 feet.

The California lizardfish is not sought by most anglers because its flesh has a strong taste resembling iodine, but can uncommonly be taken in fairly large numbers by anglers fishing for halibut and other shallow water bottom-dwelling fish. They will take most baited hooks.

== Natural history ==
The California lizardfish spends most of its time camouflaged at the sandy bottom, buried or unburied, with its body propped up by its front ventral fins at a slight angle. When prey in the form of small fish or squid swims past, the fish will dart upward to grab it, swallowing the prey whole. This species is believed to spawn during the summer months, when adult fish have been observed to congregate on sandy patches. Young lizardfish are less than 3 inches (7.6 cm) long, nearly transparent, and scaleless, with a row of large black spots under the skin of the belly. They may live for about nine years, as the otoliths of a specimen taken off the Galapagos Islands indicates. The California lizardfish is also host to a parasitic tapeworm, Anantrum histocephalum.
