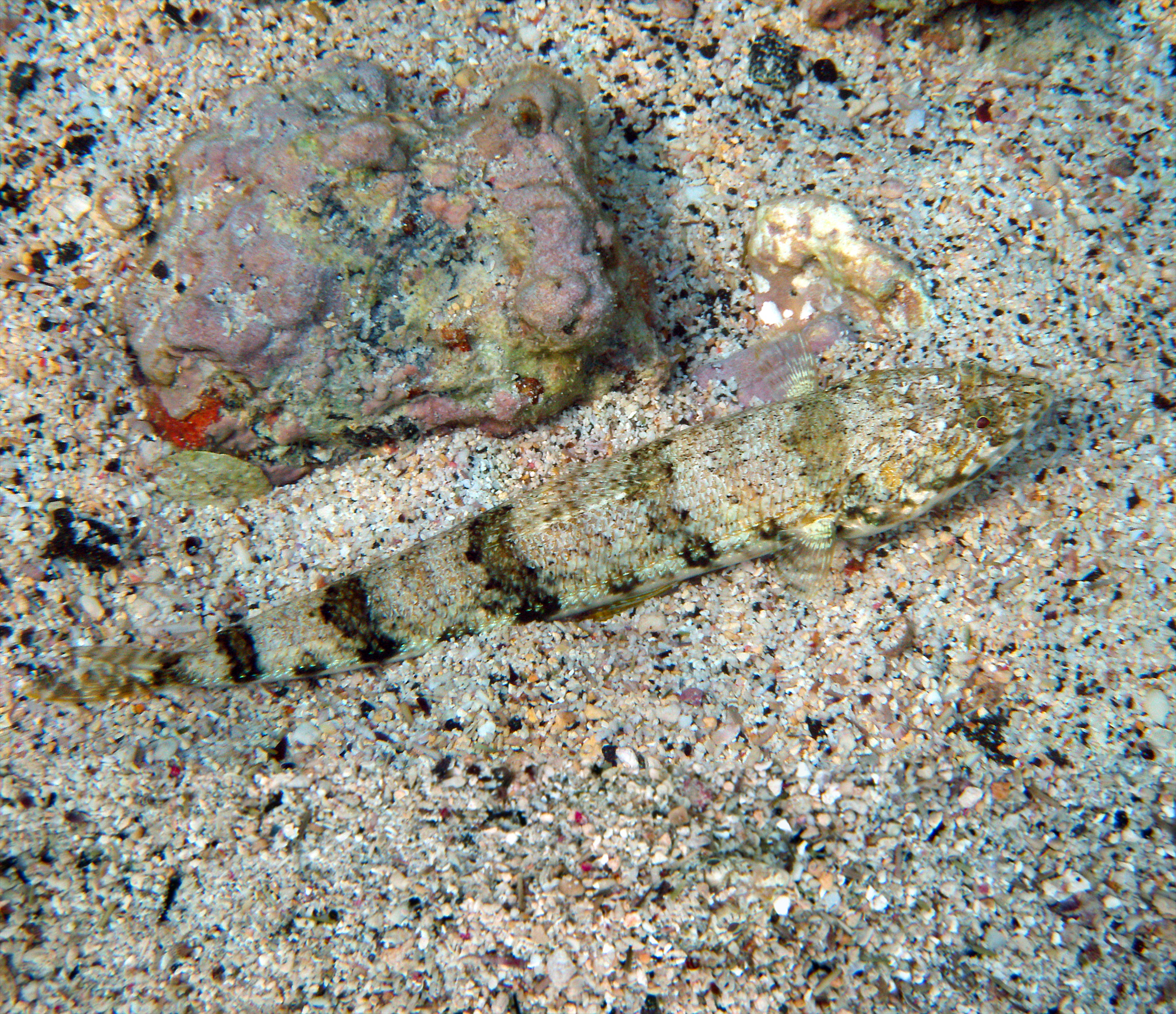

Conservation status
- Least Concern (IUCN 3.1)

Scientific classification
- Kingdom: Animalia
- Phylum: Chordata
- Class: Actinopterygii
- Order: Aulopiformes
- Family: Synodontidae
- Genus: Synodus
- Species: S. binotatus

Binomial name
- Synodus binotatus L. P. Schultz, 1953

= Two-spot lizardfish =

Species of fish

The two-spot lizardfish (Synodus binotatus) is a species of lizardfish that lives mainly in the Indo-Pacific Ocean.

== Information ==
The two-spot lizardfish is known to be found in a marine environment within a reef-associated area. This species is known to be found broadly in a benthic depth range of 3–20 m (10–66 ft). To be more specific, this species is usually found between 1–10 m (3 ft 3 in – 32 ft 10 in).

The two-spot lizardfish is native to a tropical climate. The maximum recorded length of the two-spot lizardfish as an unsexed male is about 18 cm (7.1 in). The common length of this species as an unsexed male is about 10 cm (3.9 in). The distribution of this species is known to be found in the areas of Indo-Pacific, Gulf of Aden, East Africa, Hawaiian and Gambier islands, north to the Ogasawara Islands, and south to the Great Barrier Reef. This species is known to occur in coral reefs. It is common to find this species on hard surfaces with their heads down on the slope. They also stay solitary and not within a group. This species can be found in markets sold fresh for food. It is known to be harmless and not serve as any threat to humans.

== Common names ==
The common names for the two-spot lizardfish in different languages include the following:

- Ulae : Hawaiian
- Anoli à deux taches : French
- Bubule : Tagalog
- Jebak : Marshall
- Jebak : Marshallese (Kajin M̧ajeļ)
- Kalaso : Tagalog
- Kolneus-akkedisvis : Afrikaans
- lagarto dos manchas : Spanish
- Mo'o 'anae : Tahitian (Reo Mā`ohi)
- Niten-eso : Japanese (日本語)
- Peixe-banana de manchas : Portuguese
- Spotnose lizardfish : English
- Ta'oto : Samoan (gagana fa'a Samoa)
- Tiki-tiki : Tagalog
- Tiki-tiki : Visayan
- Toplettet øglefisk : Danish
- Two-spot lizard fish : English
- Twospot lizardfish : English
- wutimate : Fijian (vosa Vakaviti)
- 吻斑狗母魚 : Mandarin Chinese
- 吻斑狗母鱼 : Mandarin Chinese
- 狗母 : Mandarin Chinese

== Notes ==
- Froese, Rainer; Pauly, Daniel (eds.). "Synodus binotatus". FishBase. April 2012 version.
