= Speartoothed grinner =

Scientific classification
- Kingdom: Animalia
- Phylum: Chordata
- Class: Actinopterygii
- Order: Aulopiformes
- Family: Synodontidae
- Genus: Synodus
- Species: S. sageneus

Binomial name
- Synodus sageneus Waite, 1905

Species of fish

The speartoothed grinner (Synodus sageneus) is a species of lizardfish that lives mainly in the Indo-West Pacific.

== Information ==
The speartoothed grinner is known to live in marine environment within a demersal range depth of about 12 – 30 meters. This species is native to tropical environment. The maximum length of the speartoothed grinner as a mature and unsexed male is about 26 centimeters or about 10.23 inches. The common length of this species is about 14 centimeters or about 5.5 inches. The maximum published weight of the speartoothed grinner was 150 grams or about .33 pounds. This species is native to the areas of Indo-West Pacific, Sri Lanka, the Arafura, Australia, and New Guinea. It is also known to be sold in markets as a source of food. People sell this species of fish fresh or salted. It is recorded to be rare to find in its common environment of shallow shelf waters.

== Common names ==
The common names of the Synodus sageneus are as follows:

- French : Anoli poignard
- English : Banded lizardfish
- English : Fishnet lizardfish
- Spanish : Lagarto espadachín
- English : Netted lizardfish
- English : speartoothed grinner
- Chinese : 尖齒狗母魚

== Notes ==
- Froese, Rainer; Pauly, Daniel (eds.). "Synodus sageneus". FishBase. April 2012 version.
