= Synodus gibbsi =

Scientific classification
- Domain: Eukaryota
- Kingdom: Animalia
- Phylum: Chordata
- Class: Actinopterygii
- Order: Aulopiformes
- Family: Synodontidae
- Genus: Synodus
- Species: S. gibbsi

Binomial name
- Synodus gibbsi Cressey, 1981

Species of fish

Synodus gibbsi is a species of lizardfish that lives mainly in the Indian Ocean. It is found in a marine demersal environment. This species is native to a tropical climate. Synodus gibbsi is recorded to not serve as any threat to humans.
