= Gunther's lizard fish =

Scientific classification
- Kingdom: Animalia
- Phylum: Chordata
- Class: Actinopterygii
- Order: Aulopiformes
- Family: Synodontidae
- Genus: Synodus
- Species: S. kaianus

Binomial name
- Synodus kaianus (Günther, 1880)

Species of fish

The Gunther's lizardfish (Synodus kaianus) is a species of lizardfish that seems to live mainly in the Pacific Ocean. This fish species is extremely rare and so far only one specimen has been found in Hawaii.
