= Inotted lizardfish =

Conservation status
- Least Concern (IUCN 3.1)

Scientific classification
- Kingdom: Animalia
- Phylum: Chordata
- Class: Actinopterygii
- Order: Aulopiformes
- Family: Synodontidae
- Genus: Synodus
- Species: S. evermanni

Binomial name
- Synodus evermanni D. S. Jordan & Bollman, 1890

Species of fish

The Inotted lizardfish (Synodus evermanni) is a type of lizardfish that lives mainly in the Eastern Pacific.

S. evermanni is found in marine environments at a demersal depth range around 25–275 m (80–900 ft). This species is native to a tropical climate. The common length for an unsexed male is about 20 cm or 8 in. This species is known to occupy the areas of Eastern Pacific, Mazatlán, Mexico, Chilca, and Peru. They are commonly found on soft bottoms in the ocean. The Inotted lizardfish can be identified by its large eyes and knob chin. It also has a brownish grey, elongated body. The species is also known to have dark splotches on its back. This species is also frequently and accidentally caught by shrimp trawlers. S. evermanni serves as no threat to humans.
