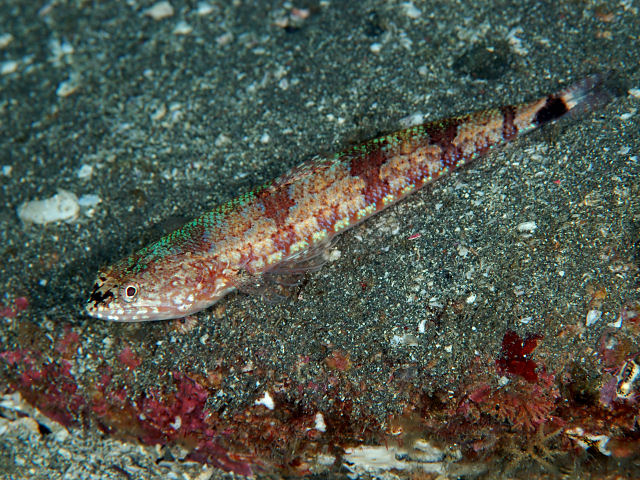

Scientific classification
- Kingdom: Animalia
- Phylum: Chordata
- Class: Actinopterygii
- Order: Aulopiformes
- Family: Synodontidae
- Genus: Synodus
- Species: S. jaculum

Binomial name
- Synodus jaculum B. C. Russell & Cressey, 1979

= Lighthouse lizardfish =

Species of fish

The lighthouse lizardfish (Synodus jaculum), also known as the blacktail lizardfish, is a species of lizardfish that lives mainly in the Indo-Pacific.

== Information ==
The lighthouse lizardfish is known to live in a marine environment within a depth range of about 2–100 meters. They are native to reef-associated locations within a tropical climate. The average length of the Synodus jaculum as an unsexed male is about 10 centimeters or 3.9 inches. The maximum recorded length of the Synodus jaculum as an unsexed male is about 20 centimeters or 7.87 inches. This species is identified by its brown colored body with the dark brown splotches. This species also has transparent fins. The lighthouse lizardfish is native to the areas of Indo-Pacific, East Africa, Marquesan, Society islands, north to the Izu Islands in Japan, south to New South Wales in Australia, Palau, and Kosrae in Micronesia. This species occupies coral reefs and it is found on sand or rubble near coral heads. This species of fish is caught and sold as fresh and salted in markets. It is also common to find this species isolated, in pairs, or in small groups.

== Etymology ==
The specific epithet of the species, jaculum, is the Latin word for javelin, in reference to the peculiar behaviour this species has of launching itself off the bottom and swimming in midwater for prolonged periods.

== Notes ==
- Froese, Rainer; Pauly, Daniel (eds.). "Synodus jaculum". FishBase. April 2012 version.
