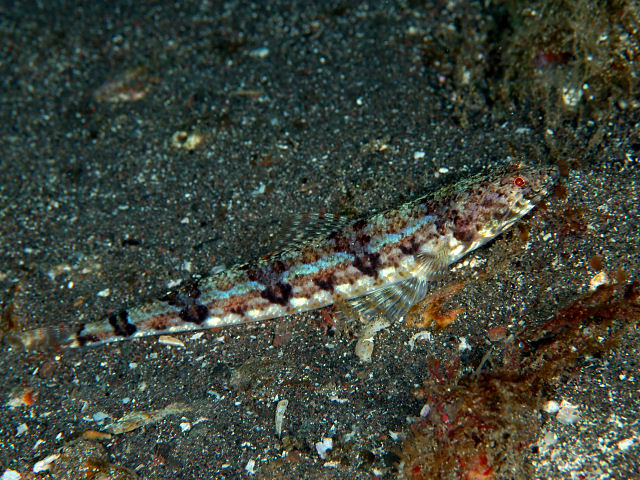

Scientific classification
- Kingdom: Animalia
- Phylum: Chordata
- Class: Actinopterygii
- Order: Aulopiformes
- Family: Synodontidae
- Genus: Synodus
- Species: S. ulae

Binomial name
- Synodus ulae L. P. Schultz, 1953

= Red lizardfish =

Red lizard fish

Species of fish

The red lizardfish (Synodus ulae), also known by its Hawaiian name ʻulae, is a species of lizardfish found in the Pacific Ocean.

== Description ==
This species has unique traits that separate it from other lizardfish species such as high lateral line-scale and vertebral counts. Red lizardfish also have long dermal flaps while other Synodontidae may have shorter flaps. It gets the name red lizardfish due to the red hue of the bands across its body. Sizes across Synodus ulae populations, specifically their snout to dorsal length, is consistent across their species. Another unique trait in comparison to other Synodontidae is that Synodus ulae have comparatively lower amounts of peritoneal spots, the average amount for a red lizardfish is 11-12 spots.

== Distribution ==
Red lizardfish occurrences have been confirmed throughout the entire Hawaiian Archipelago, both the main islands and the northwestern islands. Specimens were also collected from the Mariana Islands, and the Marshall Islands showing the western boundary of its range. Confirmed occurrences near Yaku-shima Island in the south of Japan are northernmost documented sighting of this species.

== Habitat ==
Red lizardfish, like other lizardfish species are demersal (bottom dwelling). They prefer to inhabit shallow, sandy environments near reefs, with 50 m (160 ft) or less being their preferred depth. This allows them to use sand, coral, rocks, and other debris for camouflage.

== Hunting ==
Red lizardfish bury their body under sand with only their head remaining exposed, a common ambush posture for lizardfishes.
