= Synodus mascarensis =

Scientific classification
- Kingdom: Animalia
- Phylum: Chordata
- Class: Actinopterygii
- Order: Aulopiformes
- Family: Synodontidae
- Genus: Synodus
- Species: S. mascarensis

Binomial name
- Synodus mascarensis Prokofiev, 2008

Species of fish

Synodus mascarensis is a species of lizardfish family Synodontidae that is found in the highest concentrations in the Mascarene Ridge.
