= Synodus tectus =

Scientific classification
- Domain: Eukaryota
- Kingdom: Animalia
- Phylum: Chordata
- Class: Actinopterygii
- Order: Aulopiformes
- Family: Synodontidae
- Genus: Synodus
- Species: S. tectus

Binomial name
- Synodus tectus Cressey, 1981

Species of fish

Synodus tectus, the tectus lizardfish, is a species of lizardfish that lives mainly in the West Indo-Pacific Ocean.
