= Sechura lizardfish =

Conservation status
- Least Concern (IUCN 3.1)

Scientific classification
- Kingdom: Animalia
- Phylum: Chordata
- Class: Actinopterygii
- Order: Aulopiformes
- Family: Synodontidae
- Genus: Synodus
- Species: S. sechurae

Binomial name
- Synodus sechurae Hildebrand, 1946

Species of fish

The Sechura lizardfish (Synodus sechurae) is a species of lizardfish that lives mainly in the eastern Pacific Ocean.

== Information ==
The Sechura lizardfish are known to be found in a marine environment and within a demersal depth range of about 45–60 metres (150–200 ft). This species is native to a marine environment. The maximum recorded length of the Sechura lizardfish is about 30 centimetres (11.8 in). This species is considered to be an uncommon species. This species is not used for commercial use for aquarium use, and it is not recommended.

== Common names ==
The common names of the Sechura lizardfish in different languages include the following:

- French : Anoli iguane
- Spanish : chile iguana
- Spanish : Huavina
- English : iguana lizardfish
- Spanish : Lagarto iguana
- English : Lizardfish
- Spanish : Pez lagartija
- English : Sechura lizardfish
- Mandarin Chinese : 塞氏狗母魚
- Mandarin Chinese : 塞氏狗母鱼

== Countries ==
The distribution of the Sechura lizardfish includes the following countries:

- Colombia
- Costa Rica
- Ecuador
- El Salvador
- Guatemala
- Honduras
- Mexico
- Nicaragua
- Panama
- Peru

== Classification ==
The taxonomic classification of the Sechura lizardfish is as follows:

- Kingdom : Animalia
- Phylum : Chordata
- Class : Actinoptergii
- Order : Aulopiformes
- Family : Synodontidae
