= Synodus mundyi =

Mundy's arrowtooth lizardfish

Scientific classification
- Kingdom: Animalia
- Phylum: Chordata
- Class: Actinopterygii
- Order: Aulopiformes
- Family: Synodontidae
- Genus: Synodus
- Species: S. mundyi

Binomial name
- Synodus mundyi John E. Randall, 2009

Species of fish

Synodus mundyi (Mundy's arrowtooth lizardfish) is a lizardfish of the family Synodontidae, found in the Hawaiian Islands, at depths of between 9 and 200 m. Its length is between 15 and 28 cm.

== Taxonomy ==
Synodus mundyi was previously identified as Synodus doaki by many authors, but Randall (2009) noted that Hawaiian specimens differ from S. doaki in the scale counts and numbers of anal rays, and named them S. mundyi, in honor of Bruce C. Mundy.
