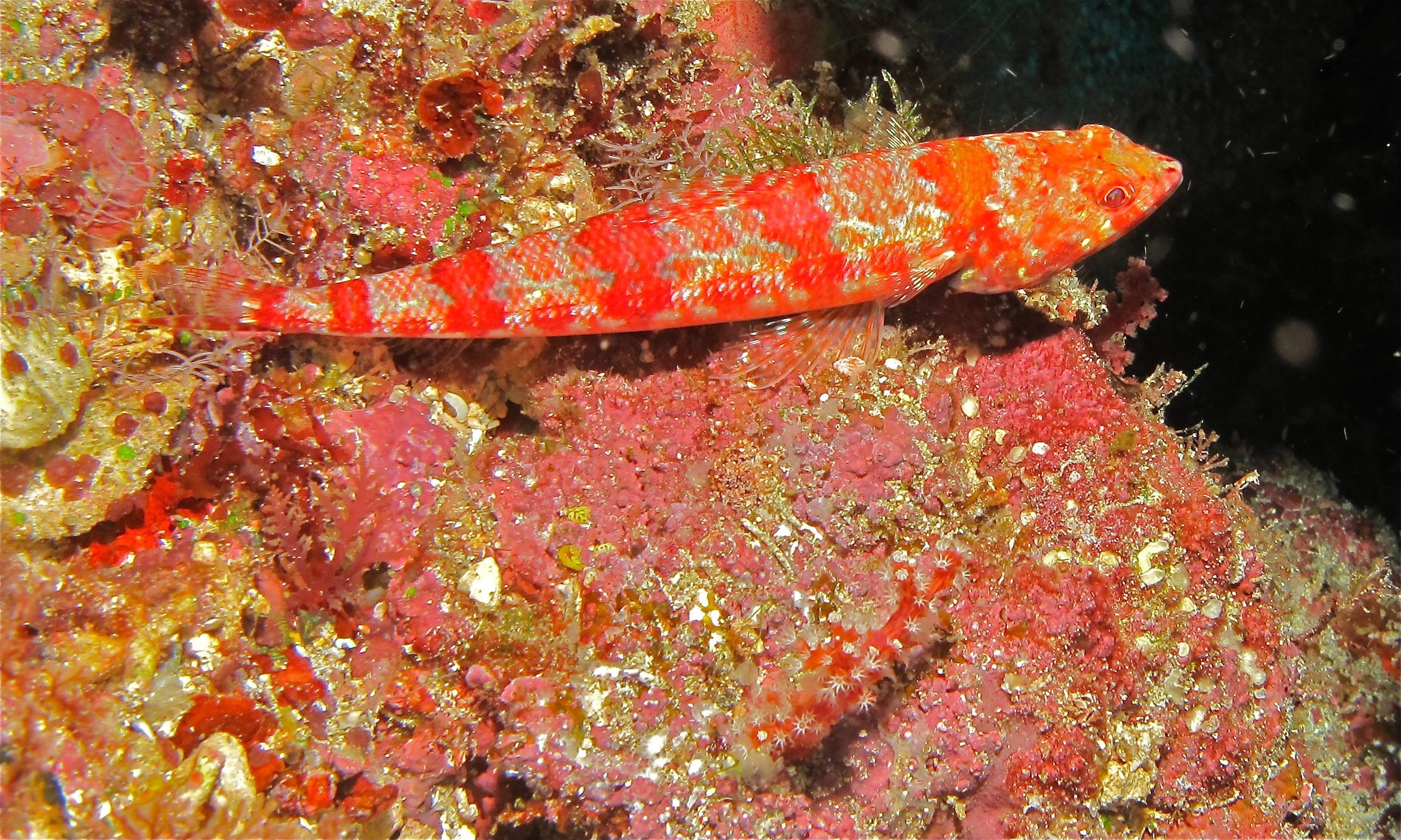
- Muka, Bunaken Island, Sulawesi, Indonesia

Scientific classification
- Kingdom: Animalia
- Phylum: Chordata
- Class: Actinopterygii
- Order: Aulopiformes
- Family: Synodontidae
- Genus: Synodus
- Species: S. rubromarmoratus

Binomial name
- Synodus rubromarmoratus Russell & Cressey, 1979

= Synodus rubromarmoratus =

Species of fish

Synodus rubromarmoratus, the redmarbled lizardfish, is a species of lizardfish that primarily lives in the Indo-West Pacific.
