= Arrowtooth lizardfish =

Conservation status
- Least Concern (IUCN 3.1)

Scientific classification
- Kingdom: Animalia
- Phylum: Chordata
- Class: Actinopterygii
- Order: Aulopiformes
- Family: Synodontidae
- Genus: Synodus
- Species: S. doaki

Binomial name
- Synodus doaki B. C. Russell & Cressey, 1979

Species of fish

The arrowtooth lizardfish (Synodus doaki) is a lizardfish of the family Synodontidae, found in isolate locations across the southwestern Pacific (namely Queensland, the Coral Sea, New Caledonia, Lord Howe Island, Norfolk Island and the North Island), at depths of between 9 and 200 m. Its length is between 15 and 28 cm.

Published occurrences of Synodus doaki from the Hawaiian Islands, Indonesia, Philippines, Easter Island, and Fiji are now treated as the distinct species Synodus mundyi, S. fasciapelvicus, S. isolatus, S. pylei, and S. sanguineus.
