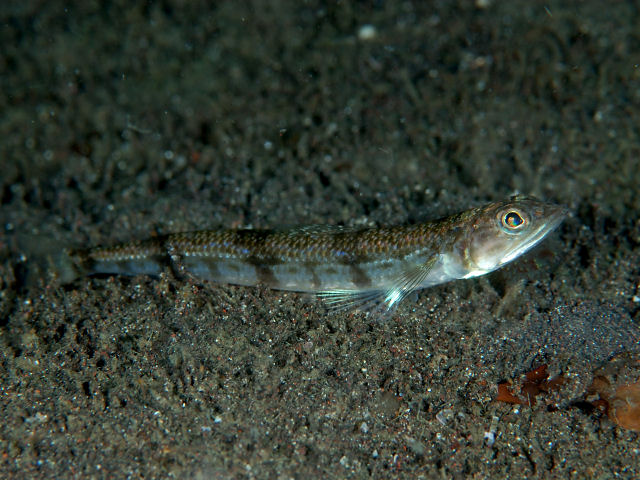

Scientific classification
- Kingdom: Animalia
- Phylum: Chordata
- Class: Actinopterygii
- Order: Aulopiformes
- Family: Synodontidae
- Genus: Synodus
- Species: S. macrops

Binomial name
- Synodus macrops S. Tanaka (I), 1917

= Triplecross lizardfish =

Species of fish

The triplecross lizardfish (Synodus macrops) is a type of lizardfish that lives mainly in the Indo-West Pacific.

== Information ==
The triplecross lizardfish can be found in a marine environment within a demersal depth range of about 35–200 m (110–660 ft). This species is native to a tropical environment. The maximum recorded length of the Triplecross lizardfish as an unsexed male is about 20 cm (7.9 in). The common length of this species as an unsexed male is around 10 cm (3.9 in). The triplecross lizardfish can be found in the areas of Indo-West Pacific, Red Sea, India, Andaman Sea, eastward to southern Japan, and Australia. It is common in ranges from coastal sand flats to deep off-shore, but prefers deeper waters. It is used as a source of food. It is commonly caught and sold fresh or dried salted in markets. This species is considered to be a benthic species. The Triplecross lizardfish serves as no threat to humans and it is considered to be harmless. This species cannot be kept in an aquarium or be used for commercial trading for aquaria.

== Notes ==
- Froese, Rainer; Pauly, Daniel (eds.). "Synodus macrops". FishBase. April 2012 version.
