= Shorthead lizardfish =

Scientific classification
- Domain: Eukaryota
- Kingdom: Animalia
- Phylum: Chordata
- Class: Actinopterygii
- Order: Aulopiformes
- Family: Synodontidae
- Genus: Synodus
- Species: S. scituliceps

Binomial name
- Synodus scituliceps D. S. Jordan & C. H. Gilbert, 1882

Species of fish

The shorthead lizardfish (Synodus scituliceps) is a species of lizardfish that lives mainly in the eastern Pacific Ocean.

== Information ==
Synodus scituliceps is recorded as least concern to becoming an endangered species and there are no major threats that influence the decline of its population. This species is native to the countries of Chile, Colombia, Costa Rica, Ecuador, El Salvador, Guatemala, Honduras, Mexico, Nicaragua, Panama, and Peru. Synodus scituliceps are found in Marine Protected Areas in the Gulf of California and the Galapagos Islands. It is common to find this species in cooler waters with soft substrate at the bottom. This species can be found in a marine environment within a demersal range. They are also native to a tropical environment. The average length of Synodus scituliceps as an unsexed male is about 35 centimeters or 13.7 inches. They can reach up to 22 inches at maturity. Synodus scituliceps is identified by its slender, grey-colored body. This species has a small eyes, a large mouth, a pointed snout, and sharp teeth. They have a knob chin with pectorals that do not reach the pelvic origin. They are considered to be a part of the carnivore feeding group. They eat shrimp, crab, octopus, squid, and cuttlefish. The females produce the egg type of pelagic larvae.

== Common names ==
The common names for Synodus scituliceps include the following:

=== English common names ===
- Lance lizardfish
- Shorthead lizardfish

=== Spanish common names ===
- Chile arpón
- Huavina
- Lagarto camote puro
- Lagarto liguisa

== Notes ==
- Froese, Rainer; Pauly, Daniel (eds.). "Synodus scituliceps". FishBase. April 2012 version.
