= Synodus marchenae =

Scientific classification
- Kingdom: Animalia
- Phylum: Chordata
- Class: Actinopterygii
- Order: Aulopiformes
- Family: Synodontidae
- Genus: Synodus
- Species: S. marchenae

Binomial name
- Synodus marchenae Hildebrand, 1946

Species of fish

Synodus marchenae is a species of lizardfish that is found in the highest concentrations in the Southeast Pacific Ocean.

== Environmental ==
Synodus marchenae is native to a marine environment. This species is known to be found in a demersal depth range within a tropical climate.

== Notes ==
- Froese, Rainer; Pauly, Daniel (eds.). "Synodus marchenae". FishBase. April 2012 version.
