= Synodus usitatus =

Scientific classification
- Kingdom: Animalia
- Phylum: Chordata
- Class: Actinopterygii
- Order: Aulopiformes
- Family: Synodontidae
- Genus: Synodus
- Species: S. usitatus

Binomial name
- Synodus usitatus Cressey, 1981

Species of fish

Synodus usitatus is a species of lizardfish that lives mainly in the indo-west pacific.
