= Synodus oculeus =

Scientific classification
- Domain: Eukaryota
- Kingdom: Animalia
- Phylum: Chordata
- Class: Actinopterygii
- Order: Aulopiformes
- Family: Synodontidae
- Genus: Synodus
- Species: S. oculeus

Binomial name
- Synodus oculeus Cressey, 1981

Species of fish

Synodus oculeus (commonly called the large-eyed lizardfish) is a species of lizardfish that lives mainly in the Western Pacific.

== Information ==
The large-eyed lizardfish can be found in a marine environment within a tropical climate. In the ocean, this species lives in at a demersal depth. The average length of an unsexed male is about 18.3 cm (7.2 in). The color is brown and silvery-gray with red splotches on it. The fins of this species are all pale in color.

Large-eyed lizardfish live in saltwater. They are native to the areas of Indonesia and the Chesterfield Islands. This species does not occur in brackish water, freshwater, or reefs, and cannot be kept in an aquarium.

== Notes ==
- Froese, Rainer; Pauly, Daniel (eds.). "Synodus oculeus". FishBase. April 2012 version.
