= Synodus fuscus =

Scientific classification
- Kingdom: Animalia
- Phylum: Chordata
- Class: Actinopterygii
- Order: Aulopiformes
- Family: Synodontidae
- Genus: Synodus
- Species: S. fuscus

Binomial name
- Synodus fuscus S. Tanaka (I), 1917

Species of fish

Synodus fuscus is a species of lizardfish that lives mainly in the Northwest Pacific Ocean.
