= Synodus macrocephalus =

Scientific classification
- Kingdom: Animalia
- Phylum: Chordata
- Class: Actinopterygii
- Division: Teleostei
- Order: Aulopiformes
- Family: Synodontidae
- Genus: Synodus
- Species: S. macrocephalus

Binomial name
- Synodus macrocephalus Cressey, 1981

Species of fish

Synodus macrocephalus is a species of lizardfish that lives mainly in the Indo-West Pacific. A common English name largehead lizardfish.

== Information ==
S. macrocephalus is known to be found in a marine environment within a demersal range. This species is native to a tropical climate. The average length of an unsexed male is about 7.8 cm (3.1 in). They commonly occupy Indonesia and the Chesterfield Islands.

It is a marine species only recorded to live in salt water. S. macrocephalus is also known to be reef-associated when it comes to its living environment.

== Notes ==
- Froese, Rainer; Pauly, Daniel (eds.). "Synodus macrocephalus". FishBase. April 2012 version.
