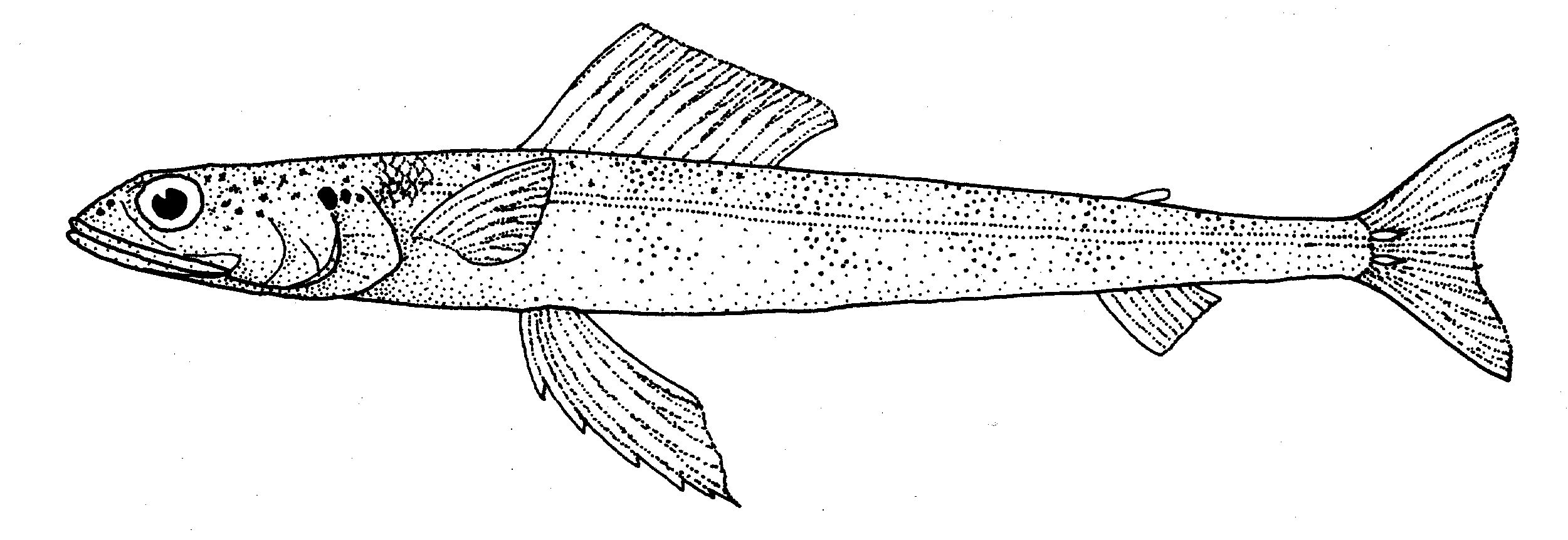

Scientific classification
- Kingdom: Animalia
- Phylum: Chordata
- Class: Actinopterygii
- Order: Aulopiformes
- Family: Synodontidae
- Genus: Synodus
- Species: S. similis

Binomial name
- Synodus similis McCulloch, 1921

= Lavender lizardfish =

Species of fish

The lavender lizardfish (Synodus similis) is a lizardfish of the family Synodontidae, found in the western Pacific including Japan, north eastern Australia, Lord Howe Island, and northern New Zealand, at depths down to 75 m. Its length is between 12 and 18 cm.
