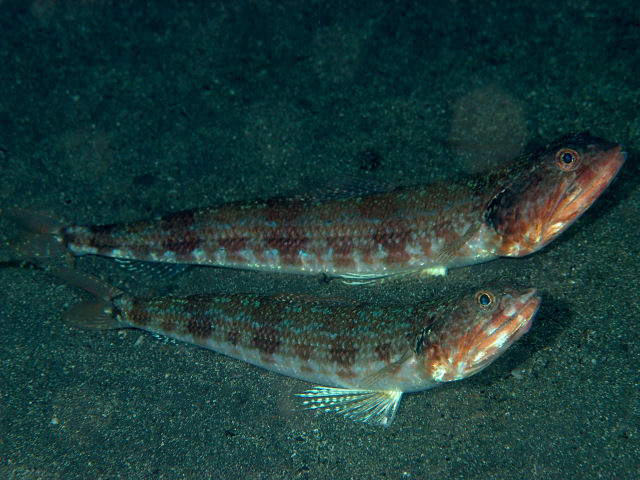

Scientific classification
- Kingdom: Animalia
- Phylum: Chordata
- Class: Actinopterygii
- Order: Aulopiformes
- Family: Synodontidae
- Genus: Synodus
- Species: S. hoshinonis

Binomial name
- Synodus hoshinonis S. Tanaka (I), 1917

= Blackear lizardfish =

Species of fish

The blackear lizardfish (Synodus hoshinonis) is a species of lizardfish that lives mainly in the Indo-West Pacific Ocean.
