= Synodus falcatus =

Scientific classification
- Kingdom: Animalia
- Phylum: Chordata
- Class: Actinopterygii
- Order: Aulopiformes
- Family: Synodontidae
- Genus: Synodus
- Species: S. falcatus

Binomial name
- Synodus falcatus Waples & J. E. Randall, 1989

Synonyms
- Synodus janus Waples & Randall, 1989

Species of fish

Synodus falcatus is a species of lizardfish that lives mainly in the eastern central Pacific Ocean.

== Environment ==
Synodus falcatus is native to a subtropical climate. They are commonly found in a benthic depth range of about 65 – 115 meters.

== Identification ==
Synodus falcatus is identified by its rose color or an orangish-brown color.

== Distribution ==
Synodus falcatus is recorded to reside in the areas of Eastern Central Pacific and Hawaii.

== Size ==
Synodus falcatus is known to reach the maximum recorded length of about 14.5 centimeters or about 5.7 inches.
