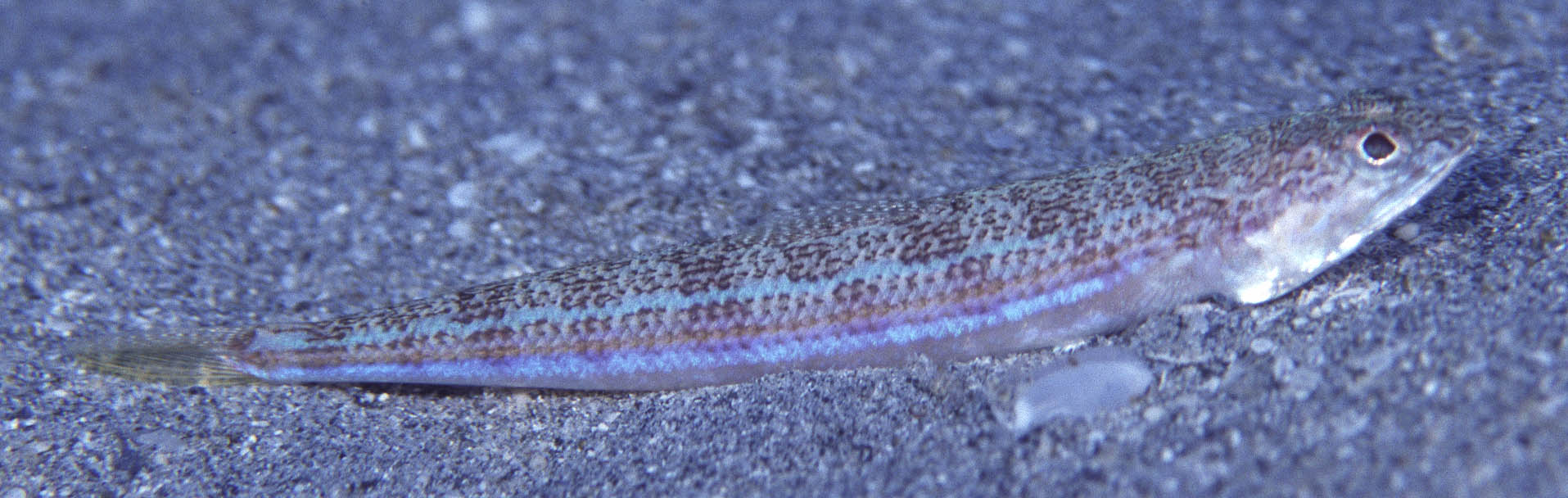

Conservation status
- Least Concern (IUCN 3.1)

Scientific classification
- Kingdom: Animalia
- Phylum: Chordata
- Class: Actinopterygii
- Division: Teleostei
- Order: Aulopiformes
- Family: Synodontidae
- Genus: Synodus
- Species: S. lobeli

Binomial name
- Synodus lobeli Waples & J. E. Randall, 1988

= Synodus lobeli =

Species of fish

Synodus lobeli, common name Lobel's lizardfish, is a marine species of lizardfish that lives mainly in the Northwest Pacific Ocean.

It was named in honor of a ichthyologist named Philip S. Lobel who worked extensively at Johnston Atoll.

== Description ==
The average length of S. lobeli is 38.7–116.3 mm (1.52–4.58 in) in standard length and they have an average of 11 to 12 dorsal rays, and 10 to 11 peritoneal spots. They have around 30 needle sharp teeth, with around 3 to 4 rows on the on the lower jaw, and 3 to 4 more rows on the upper jaw. Their colors consists of faint blue and yellow stripes that run down their body from head to tail.

== Distribution ==
It is native to the areas of Northwest Pacific, Japan, Eastern Central Pacific, Hawaii, and Taiwan. It lives within a demersal depth range of about 30–140 m (98–459 ft) in the tropics. It tends to live out far from any reefs, living in open sand beds.
