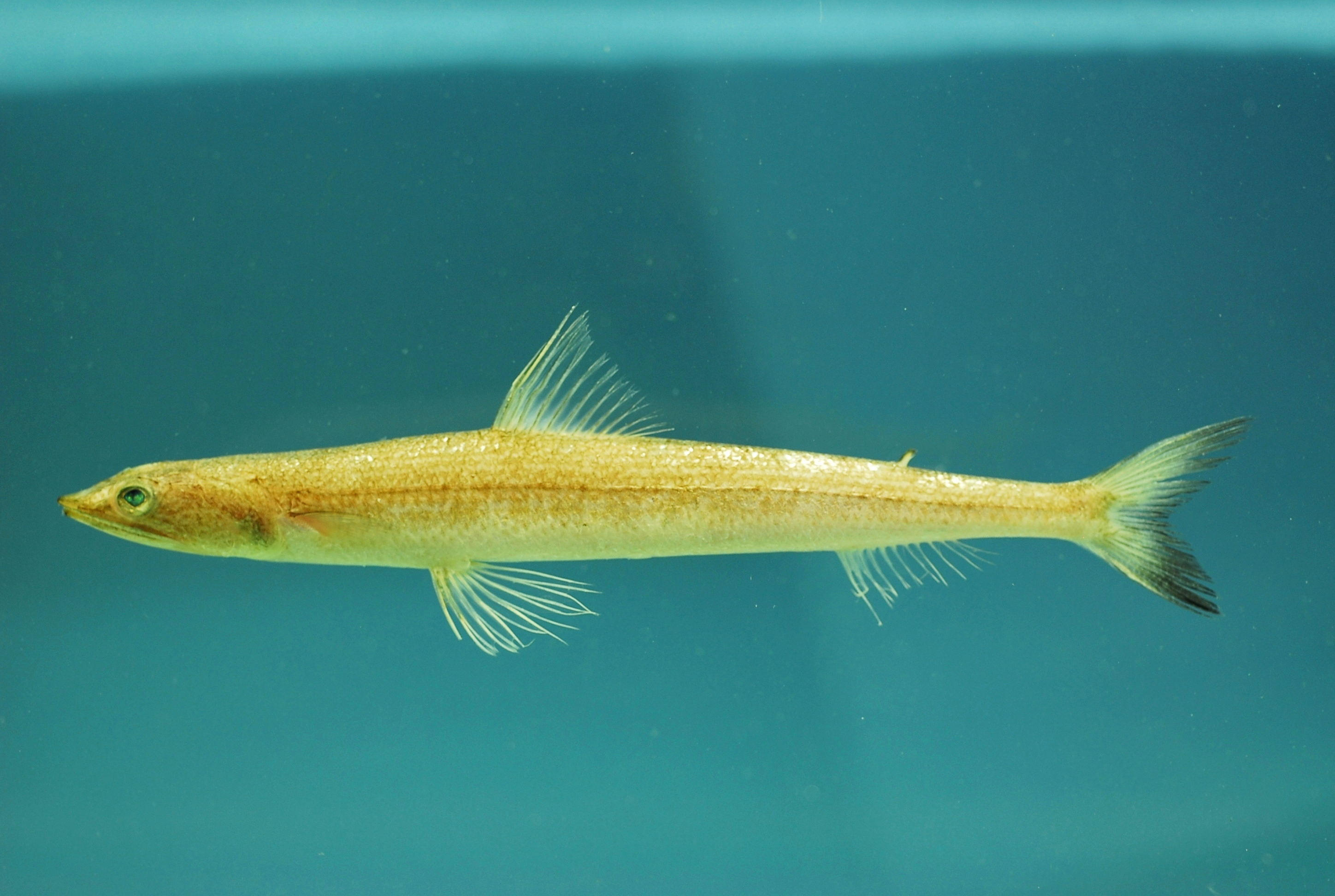

Conservation status
- Least Concern (IUCN 3.1)

Scientific classification
- Kingdom: Animalia
- Phylum: Chordata
- Class: Actinopterygii
- Division: Teleostei
- Order: Aulopiformes
- Family: Synodontidae
- Genus: Synodus
- Species: S. foetens

Binomial name
- Synodus foetens (Linnaeus, 1766)

= Inshore lizardfish =

Species of fish

The inshore lizardfish (Synodus foetens) is a member of the family Synodontidae found in the western Atlantic.

== Description ==
The inshore lizardfish has a maximum length recorded of about 50 cm (20 in) but lengths around 40 cm (16 in) are more common. Their lifespan can be up to nine years. The body of this species is elongated, similar to a cigar. Inshore lizardfishes have a thin body that swims quickly and has a subcarangiform swimming style. The heads of lizardfish are slightly compressed and the tops of their heads are wrinkly in nature. The maximum weight has been seen as 900 g (32 oz). Females are generally larger than males when mature. The shape of the mouth of this species is large and pointed. The snout is pointed. The top jaw extends beyond the eye. They rely on their vision to spot prey from below so inshore lizardfishes have large eyes and rounded pupils. Many slender teeth are present in the roof of the mouth and jaws. The lateral line is considered to be well marked. The lateral line encompasses around 60 scales along the length. The inshore lizardfish has no dorsal spines, 10-13 dorsal soft rays, no anal spines, 11-13 anal soft rays, and 56-62 vertebrae. Inshore lizardfish have large dorsal and pelvic fins in comparison to their body to assist with steering. A large, pointed caudal fin helps to propel the fish forward. The color of the dorsal side of the lizardfish ranges from various shades of brown to olive. The belly side ranges from white to yellow. Juveniles have dark spots, these spots are reduced/absent in adults. The sides of the inshore lizardfish have patches that are diamond-shaped. These patches vary in occurrence and intensity, they usually fade with growth and usually occur at the midlateral line on the fish. The dorsal fin is on the center of the back. An adipose fin is present in this species, usually showing a darker spot. The adipose fin is small in size with the base of the fin being no longer than the diameter of the pupil. The anal fin is usually equal in length or longer than the dorsal fin. Larvae are slender to navigate the changing environmental conditions of their habitat. They have small pointed snouts and large eyes. Advantages like these help the inshore lizardfish detect prey through their senses and allow them to monitor their environment.

== Diet ==
The inshore lizardfish is an ambush predator. Its diet consists of various demersal fish and small invertebrates. They include: shrimp, crabs, and cephalopods. Because the inshore lizardfish reside in environments that have lots of changing conditions, the inshore lizardfish diet also changes with the conditions. In the Gulf of Mexico, specifically, the inshore lizardfish relies on certain species to get through the seasons. During the colder months, between November and February, inshore lizardfish mainly rely on two different species: Upeneus parvus and Loligo pealei. During the rainier season, the inshore lizardfish was seen to rely on Engyophrys senta and L. pealei. The inshore lizardfish is seen hunting in a wild manner where it lurches at its prey and then quickly finishes it off. There are records of inshore lizardfish that have shrimp, crabs, squid, sea urchins, and annelids in their stomachs, but other smaller fish are their main food source. Its diverse diet allows it to adapt to many different biotic and abiotic conditions and it has a large niche because of its flexibility. In a study conducted in Florida about the parasites within Synodus foetens, the digestive tracts and stomachs were observed in many specimens. In the article, "Parasites of the Inshore Lizardfish, Synodus foetens, from South Florida, Including a Description of a New Genus of Cestoda", they found many species like, Penaeus duorarum, a palaemonid shrimp, several species of small crustaceans, and the fishes Synodus foetens, Anchoa mitchilli, Lagodon rhomboides, Eucinostomus argenteus, Sphoeroides sp., Cyprinodon variegatus, Poecilia latipinna, Gobionellus sp., a cyprinodontid, an atherinid, and others that were too digested to identify" (Overstreet, 1968).

== Habitat ==
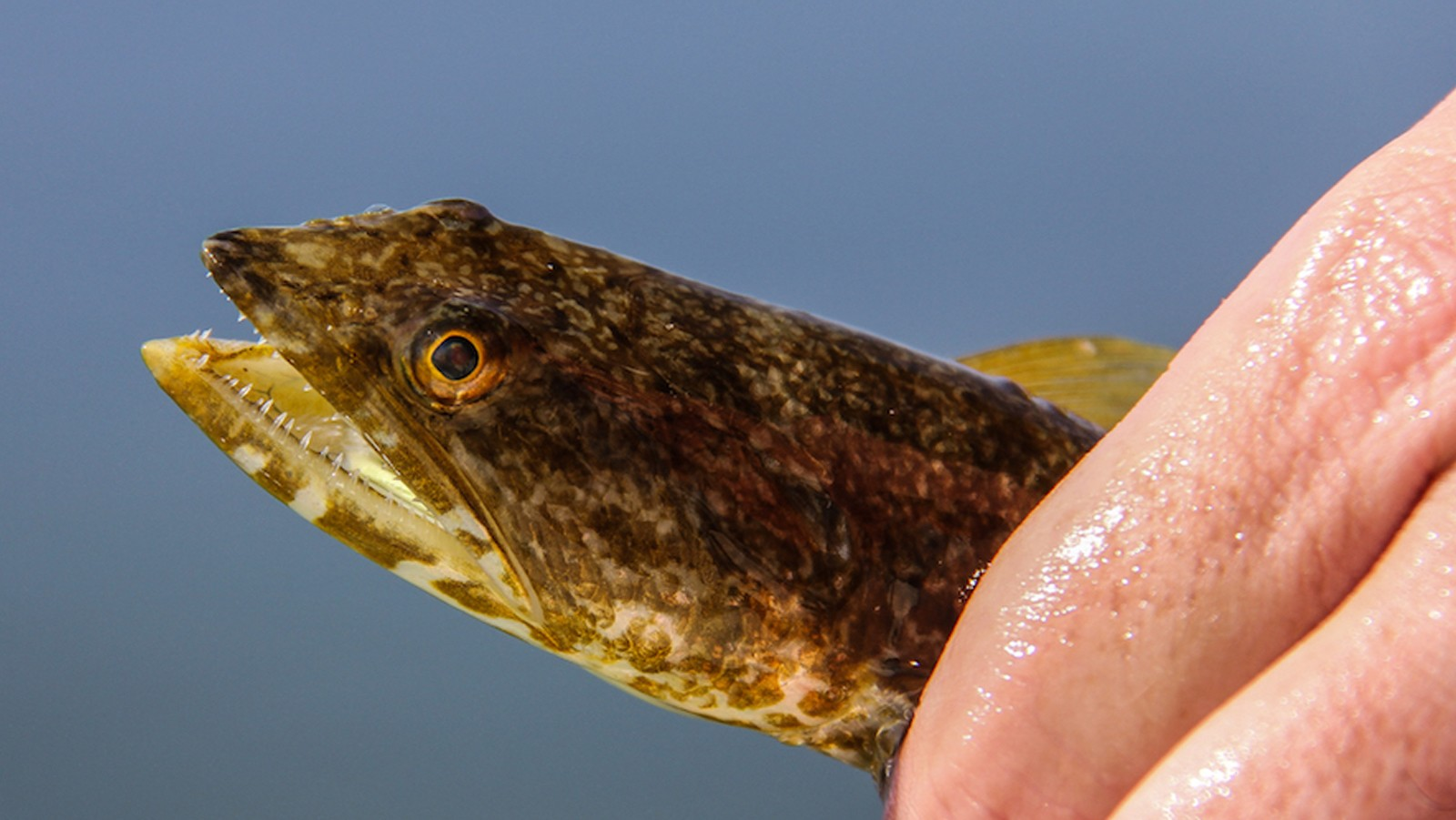
An inshore lizardfish from the Florida Bay.

The habitats for these fish include the bottom in shallow inshore marine waters, usually over sand or mud bottoms, including creeks, rivers, among seagrasses, estuaries, bays, and lagoons. Adults have been found to be also in the open sea above continental shelves. The inshore lizardfish has been found in temperatures ranging from 8.3–31.7 °C (46.9–89.1 °F). It has also been seen to withstand a wide range of salinities, from 1.9ppt to 60 ppt. Biomass appears to determine their distribution in their habitat, smaller inshore lizardfish are found closer to shore while larger specimens are more offshore. In areas like San Blas Archipelagos, Panama, the inshore lizardfish was found to be most abundant in numbers during the dry season. During these dry periods in tropical waters, lizardfish have demonstrated themselves as key members of their ecosystem and that they take on a strong predatory role. They have been abundant in tropical reef environments. The inshore lizardfish has a great tolerance for changing conditions that would be detrimental for other species. Its capability of tolerating such a wide range of temperatures and salinities makes a strong case for the lizardfish tolerating our warming oceans and climate. Its wide range of prey also suggest that it has a large potential niche and that it could assimilate into a variety of different habitats if needed.

== Reproduction and lifecycle ==
Fertilization has been observed to be external and they spawn all throughout the year. They do not guard their spherical-shaped eggs because the eggs are scattered in the water and instead are protected by nearby plants and rocks. Lizardfish, belonging to the family of Synodontidae, have a unique lifestyle that has adapted to the ever changing waters in reef and shallow environments. According to a study by T. Lemberget about the environmental influences on lizardfish reproduction, "They have a bipartite lifecycle with a pelagic larval stage and a bottom-dwelling adult stage that can be reef-associated". This essentially states that the lizardfish lifecycle is split into two different stages. The larval stage of the inshore lizardfish aids in the wide distribution of the species because they are influenced by the elements of the pelagic zone like heavy sunlight and choppy surface waters. To support their diet of crustaceans and benthic creatures, the inshore lizardfish transforms into its bottom-dwelling version. In order to study their distribution across the ecosystem, light traps can attract late-stage larvae of lizardfish. When lizardfish are in their late-stage larval period, they are said to be photopositive, or attracted to light. By collecting larvae in these light traps, scientists can understand distribution patterns in their ecosystem.

== Distribution ==
The inshore lizardfish is widely distributed. This fish can be found over soft-bottom inshore areas, especially in the northern Gulf of Mexico described as "in the western Atlantic from New Jersey south along the U.S. coast, Bermuda, the Bahamas, and in the Caribbean from Cuba, Jamaica, Puerto Rico, and St. Martin". Their adaptability to different salinity and temperature conditions and their versatile diets allow them to remain in large populations throughout the seasonal year. Because of their abundance, they are considered a stable species that does not face threats of endangerment or extinction.

== Importance to humans ==
This species is often captured during shrimp trawls. This occurs in the northern Gulf of Mexico. High mortality occurs from trawl bycatch for this species, but they are usually just discarded after being caught because they have little to no commercial value. Inshore lizardfish is one of the most abundant lizard fish species, so it can provide a highly nutritious diet for lots of people. In Eritrea, inshore lizardfish can provide a sustainable diet when pulverised into food supplements for children. Along with maize and carrots, inshore lizardfish powder can be added to provide an extra bit of nutritional value for children when trying to stay within a low cost. There is no current seasonal restriction for the inshore lizardfish because of its large abundance in numbers and availability throughout the year. Inshore lizardfish are caught by fishing pole because of their manageable size. Because of its size, the lizardfish contains many bones but has tasty white meat that is slightly flaky.

== Etymology ==
The generic name Synodus is from the Greek syn, meaning grown together, and odus meaning teeth.
