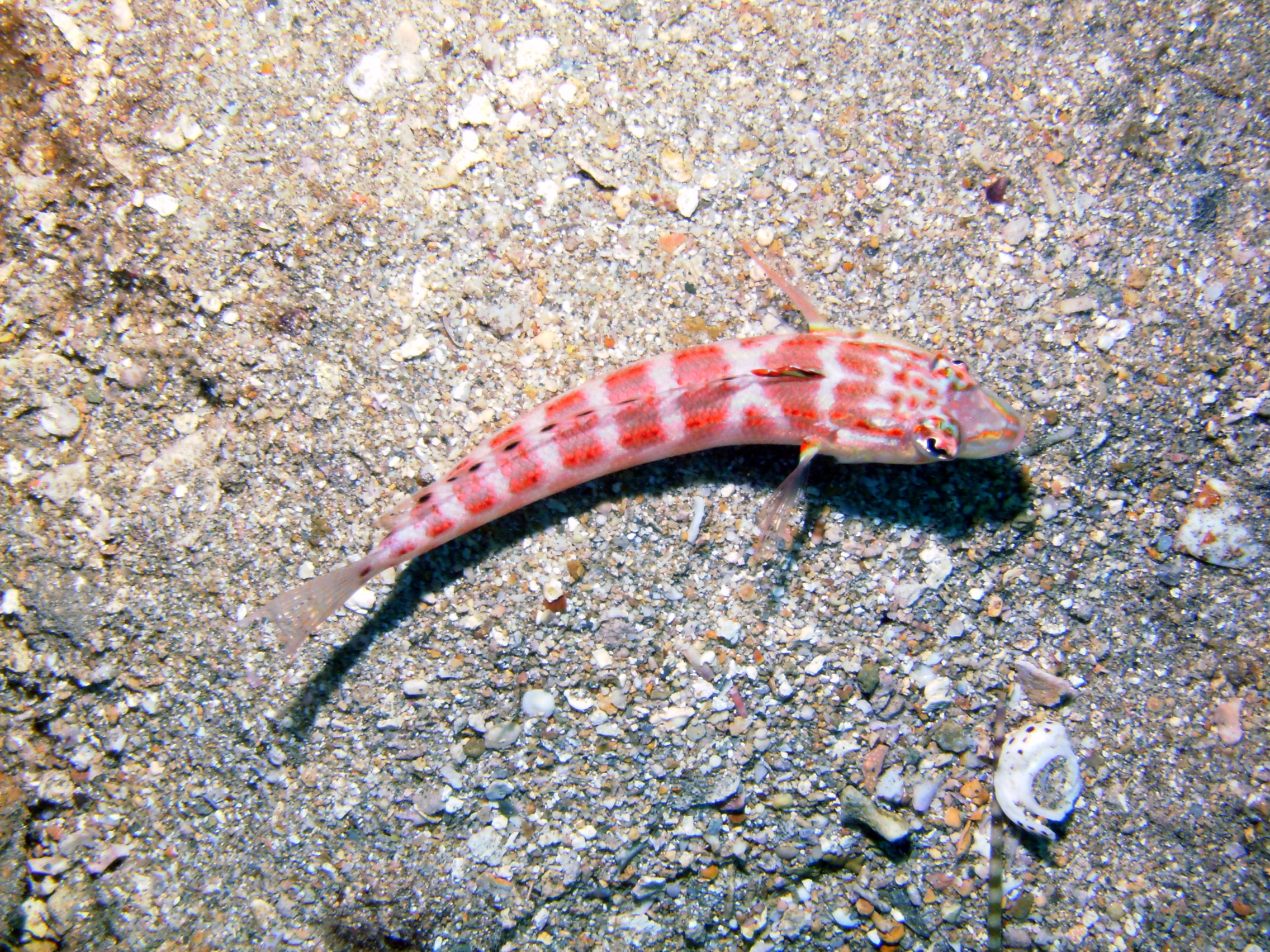

Conservation status
- Least Concern (IUCN 3.1)

Scientific classification
- Kingdom: Animalia
- Phylum: Chordata
- Class: Actinopterygii
- Order: Aulopiformes
- Family: Synodontidae
- Genus: Synodus
- Species: S. capricornis

Binomial name
- Synodus capricornis Cressey & J. E. Randall, 1978

= Capricorn lizardfish =

Species of fish

The Capricorn lizardfish (Synodus capricornis) is a species of lizardfish that lives mainly in the Pacific Ocean.

== Information ==
Synodus capricornis is known from marine environments within a demersal depth range of about 20–88 metres (70–290 ft). This species is native to a subtropical climate. The average length that Synodus capricornis can grow to as an unsexed male is about 21 centimetres (8.27 in). The species is recorded to occupy the areas of Pacific Ocean, Taiwan, Tonga, Hawaii, Easter Island, and Pitcairn. They are considered to be a benthic species. They are found at the sandy areas that surround reefs. Even though this species can be found in various locations, its common and most popular place to populate is in the Pacific Ocean. Synodus capricornus is recorded to be a resilient species that was able to double its population in fifteen months.

== Common names ==
The common names for Synodus capricornis are as follows:

- Hawaiian : 'Ulae
- French : anoli à Capricorn
- English : Capricorn lizardfish
- Spanish : lagarto dos Capricorn
- Mandarin Chinese : 羊角狗母魚
