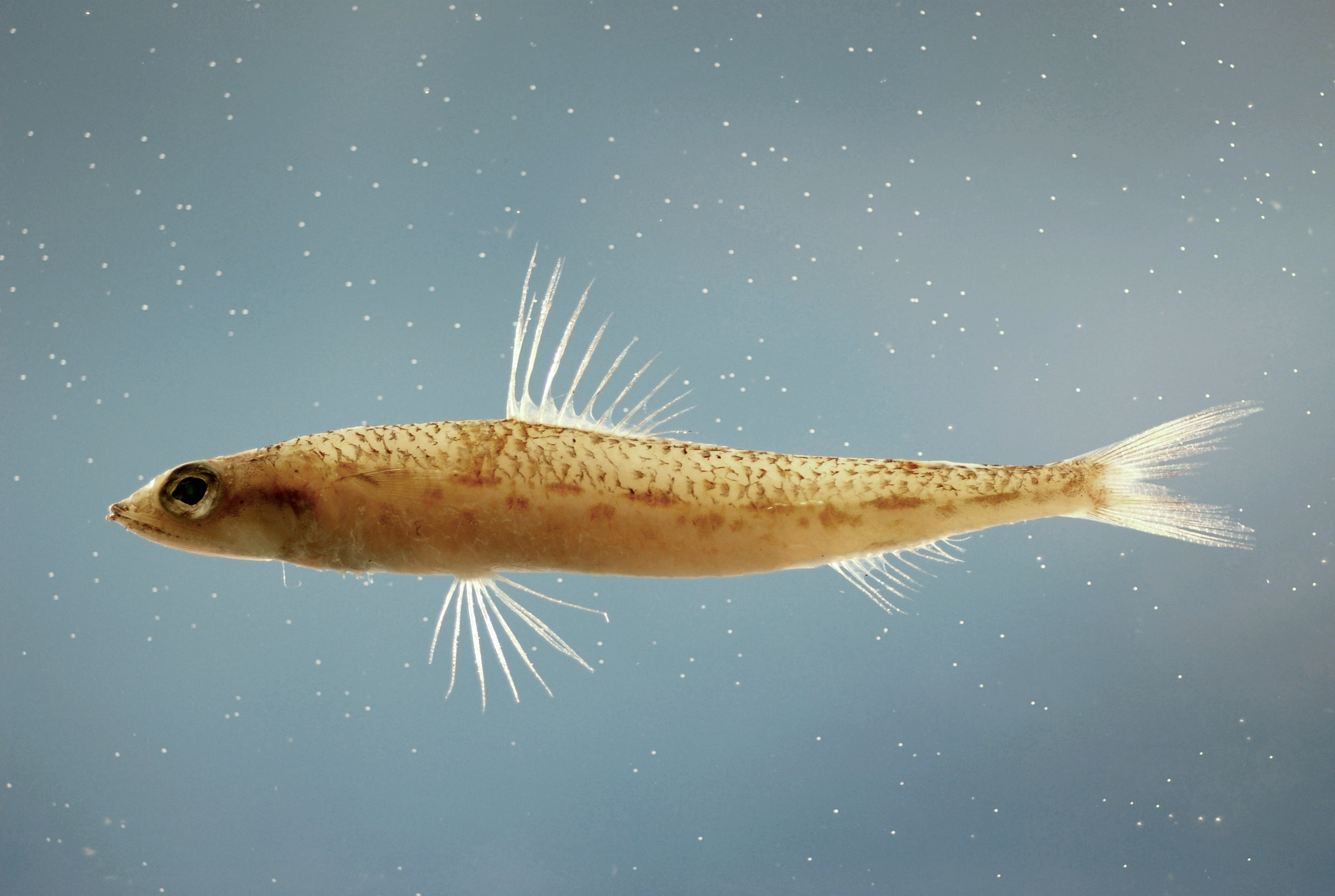

Conservation status
- Least Concern (IUCN 3.1)

Scientific classification
- Domain: Eukaryota
- Kingdom: Animalia
- Phylum: Chordata
- Class: Actinopterygii
- Order: Aulopiformes
- Family: Synodontidae
- Genus: Synodus
- Species: S. poeyi

Binomial name
- Synodus poeyi D. S. Jordan, 1887

= Offshore lizardfish =

Species of fish

The offshore lizardfish (Synodus poeyi) is a species of lizardfish that occurs chiefly in the western Atlantic.

The maximum recorded length of the offshore lizardfish is about 25 centimeters (9.8 inches).

The offshore lizardfish is a marine species associated with reefs. It occurs at depths of 27–320 meters (89–1,050 feet). This species is native to a subtropical environment. Its distribution in the Western Atlantic extends from North Carolina in the United States through the northern Gulf of Mexico and the Antilles to the Guianas. It occurs outside the shore zone. It is benthic, living along sandy and muddy bottoms.

== Common names ==
Common names for Synodus poeyi in other languages include calango, lagarto do mar, peixe-lagarto (Portuguese), chile barbado, guaripete, guavina, lagarto barbado, lagarto oceánico, manuelito (Spanish), and otogai-aka-eso (Japanese).
