= Labrophagus =

Labrophagus Temporal range: Lower Eocene

Scientific classification
- Kingdom: Animalia
- Phylum: Chordata
- Class: Actinopterygii
- Division: Teleostei
- Order: Aulopiformes
- Family: Synodontidae
- Genus: †Labrophagus; Casier, 1966 ex Agassiz, 1844
- Species: †L. esocinus

Binomial name
- †Labrophagus esocinus Casier, 1966 ex Agassiz, 1844

Extinct genus of fishes

Labrophagus (meaning "wrasse-eater") is an extinct genus of prehistoric marine lizardfish that lived during the Eocene. It contains a single species, L. esocinus from the Early Eocene-aged London Clay of England. Originally described within the flagfins (Aulopidae), later morphological analysis has determined it to be a stem group member of the Synodontidae.

The genus and species were originally named by Agassiz in 1844, but only defined as names. They were properly described by Casier in 1966, using Agassiz's original names.

== See also ==
- Prehistoric fish
- List of prehistoric bony fish
