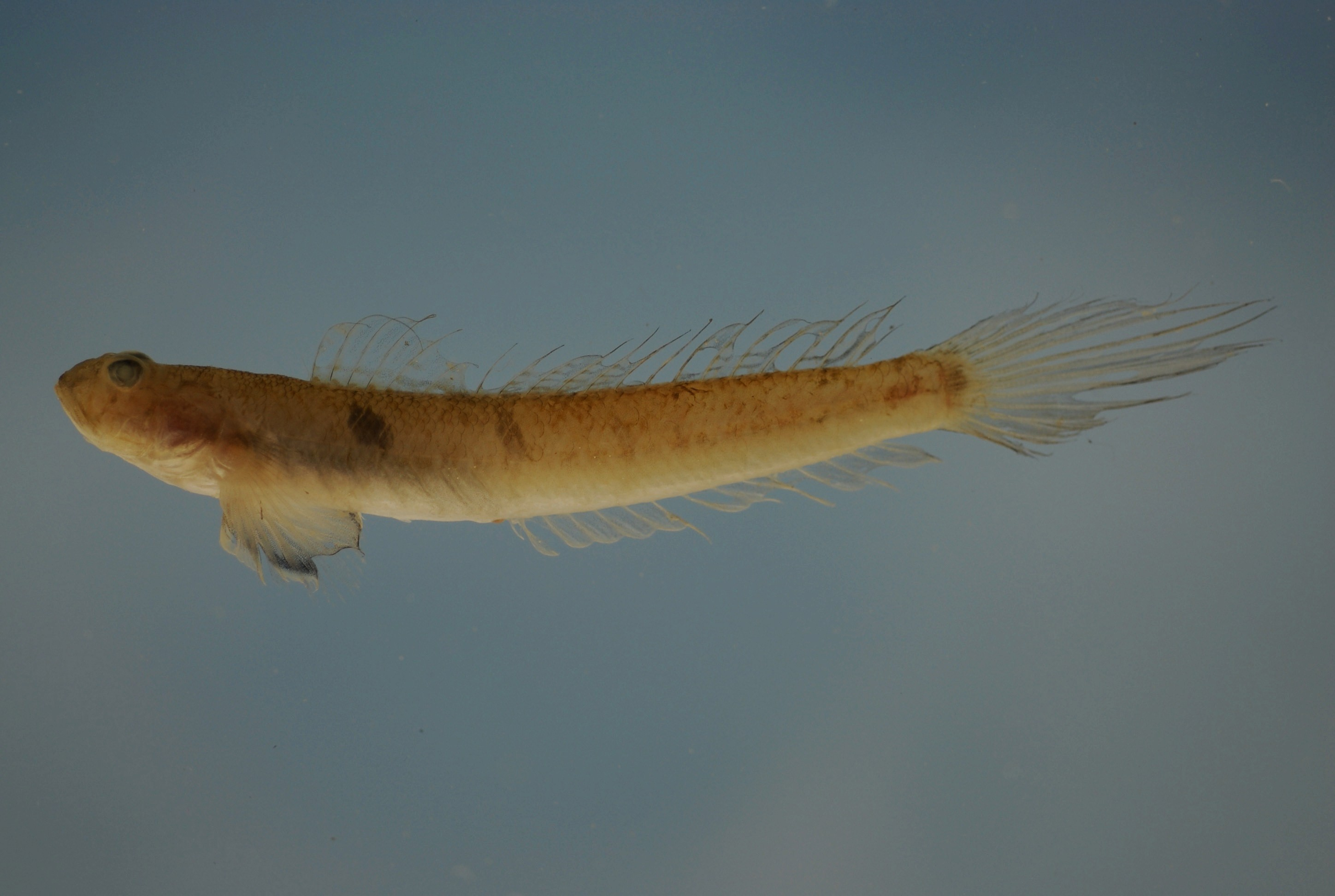

Conservation status
- Least Concern (IUCN 3.1)

Scientific classification
- Kingdom: Animalia
- Phylum: Chordata
- Class: Actinopterygii
- Division: Teleostei
- Order: Gobiiformes
- Family: Oxudercidae
- Genus: Gobionellus
- Species: G. oceanicus

Binomial name
- Gobionellus oceanicus (Pallas, 1770)

Synonyms
- Gobius oceanicus Pallas, 1770; Gobius lanceolatus Bloch, 1783; Gobius bacalaus Valenciennes, 1837; Gobionellus hastatus Girard, 1858; Paroxyurichthys typus Bleeker, 1876; Gobius bayamonensis Evermann & Marsh, 1899; Gobionellus gracillimus Ginsburg, 1953

= Gobionellus oceanicus =

Species of fish

The highfin goby (Gobionellus oceanicus) is a species of fish belonging to the family Gobiidae.

== Description ==
The highfin goby has a very long, thin body with a rounded snout. The species has a number of lightly marked lateral streaks along its body, called melanophores, which are variably present and variably paired on both sides of the body. Usually, the markings are indistinct and missing certain stripes.

== Distribution and habitat ==
The highfin goby ranges north from Virginia, and rarely New Jersey, to southern Brazil. The species can be found in both freshwater and brackish water ranging in temperature from 11 °C - 29 °C
