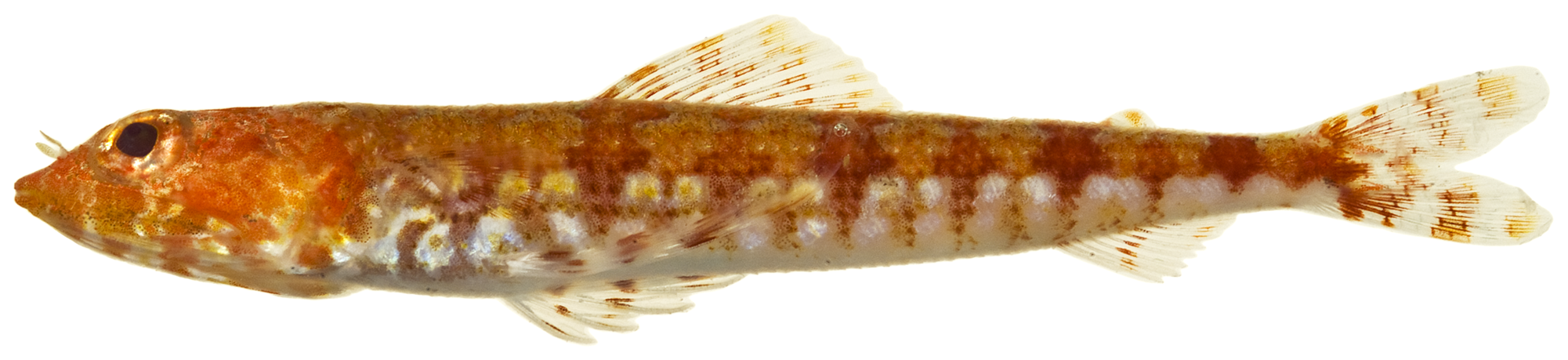
- Synodus synodus
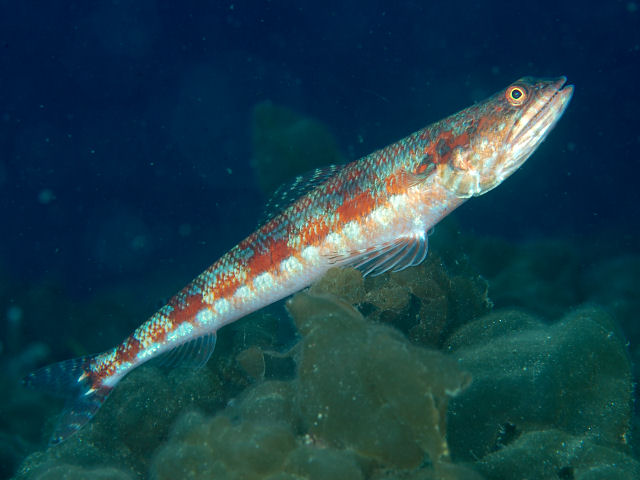
- Synodus variegatus

Scientific classification
- Kingdom: Animalia
- Phylum: Chordata
- Class: Actinopterygii
- Division: Teleostei
- Order: Aulopiformes
- Family: Synodontidae
- Subfamily: Synodontinae
- Genus: Synodus; Scopoli, 1777

Type species
- Esox synodus Linnaeus, 1758

= Synodus =

Synodus Temporal range: 23–0 Ma Early Miocene to present

Genus of fishes

Synodus is a genus of fish in the family Synodontidae found in Atlantic, Indian, and Pacific Oceans.

== Species ==
Currently, 46 species in this genus are recognized:

- Synodus binotatus L. P. Schultz, 1953 (two-spot lizardfish)
- Synodus bondi Fowler, 1939 (sharp-nose lizardfish)
- Synodus capricornis Cressey & J. E. Randall, 1978 (capricorn lizardfish)
- Synodus dermatogenys Fowler, 1912
- Synodus doaki Barry C. Russell & Cressey, 1979 (arrow-tooth lizardfish)
- Synodus evermanni D. S. Jordan & Bollman, 1890 (Inotted lizardfish)
- Synodus falcatus Waples & J. E. Randall, 1989
- Synodus fasciapelvicus J. E. Randall, 2009
- Synodus foetens (Linnaeus, 1766) (inshore lizardfish)
- Synodus fuscus S. Tanaka (I), 1917
- Synodus gibbsi Cressey, 1981
- Synodus hoshinonis S. Tanaka (I), 1917 (blackear lizardfish)
- Synodus indicus (F. Day, 1873) (Indian lizardfish)
- Synodus intermedius (Agassiz, 1829) (sand lizardfish)
- Synodus isolatus J. E. Randall, 2009 (Rapanui lizardfish)
- Synodus jaculum B. C. Russell & Cressey, 1979 (lighthouse lizardfish)
- Synodus kaianus (Günther, 1880) (Günther's lizardfish)
- Synodus lacertinus C. H. Gilbert, 1890 (sauro lizardfish)
- Synodus lobeli Waples & J. E. Randall, 1989 (Lobel's lizardfish)
- Synodus lucioceps (Ayres, 1855) (California lizardfish)
- Synodus macrocephalus Cressey, 1981
- Synodus macrops S. Tanaka (I), 1917 (triple-cross lizardfish)
- Synodus macrostigmus Frable, Luther & C. C. Baldwin, 2013 (large-spot lizardfish)
- Synodus marchenae Hildebrand, 1946 (lizardfish)
- Synodus mascarensis Prokofiev, 2008
- Synodus mundyi J. E. Randall, 2009
- Synodus oculeus Cressey, 1981 (large-eye lizardfish)
- Synodus orientalis J. E. Randall & Pyle, 2008
- Synodus pacificus H. C. Ho, J. P. Chen & K. T. Shao, 2016
- Synodus poeyi D. S. Jordan, 1887 (offshore lizardfish)
- Synodus pylei J. E. Randall, 2009
- Synodus randalli Cressey, 1981
- Synodus rubromarmoratus B. C. Russell & Cressey, 1979 (red-marbled lizardfish)
- Synodus sageneus Waite, 1905 (spear-toothed lizardfish)
- Synodus sanguineus J. E. Randall, 2009
- Synodus saurus (Linnaeus, 1758) (Atlantic lizardfish)
- Synodus scituliceps D. S. Jordan & C. H. Gilbert, 1882 (short-head lizardfish)
- Synodus sechurae Hildebrand, 1946 (Sechura lizardfish)
- Synodus similis McCulloch, 1921 (lavender lizardfish)
- Synodus synodus (Linnaeus, 1758) (diamond lizardfish)
- Synodus taiwanensis J. P. Chen, H. C. Ho & K. T. Shao, 2007
- Synodus tectus Cressey, 1981 (tectus lizardfish)
- Synodus ulae L. P. Schultz, 1953 (red lizardfish)
- Synodus usitatus Cressey, 1981
- Synodus variegatus (Lacépède, 1803) (variegated lizardfish)
- Synodus vityazi H. C. Ho, Prokofiev & K. T. Shao, 2010

A single fossil species, †Synodus avus Arambourg, 1928 is known from the latest Miocene (Messinian) of Algeria.
