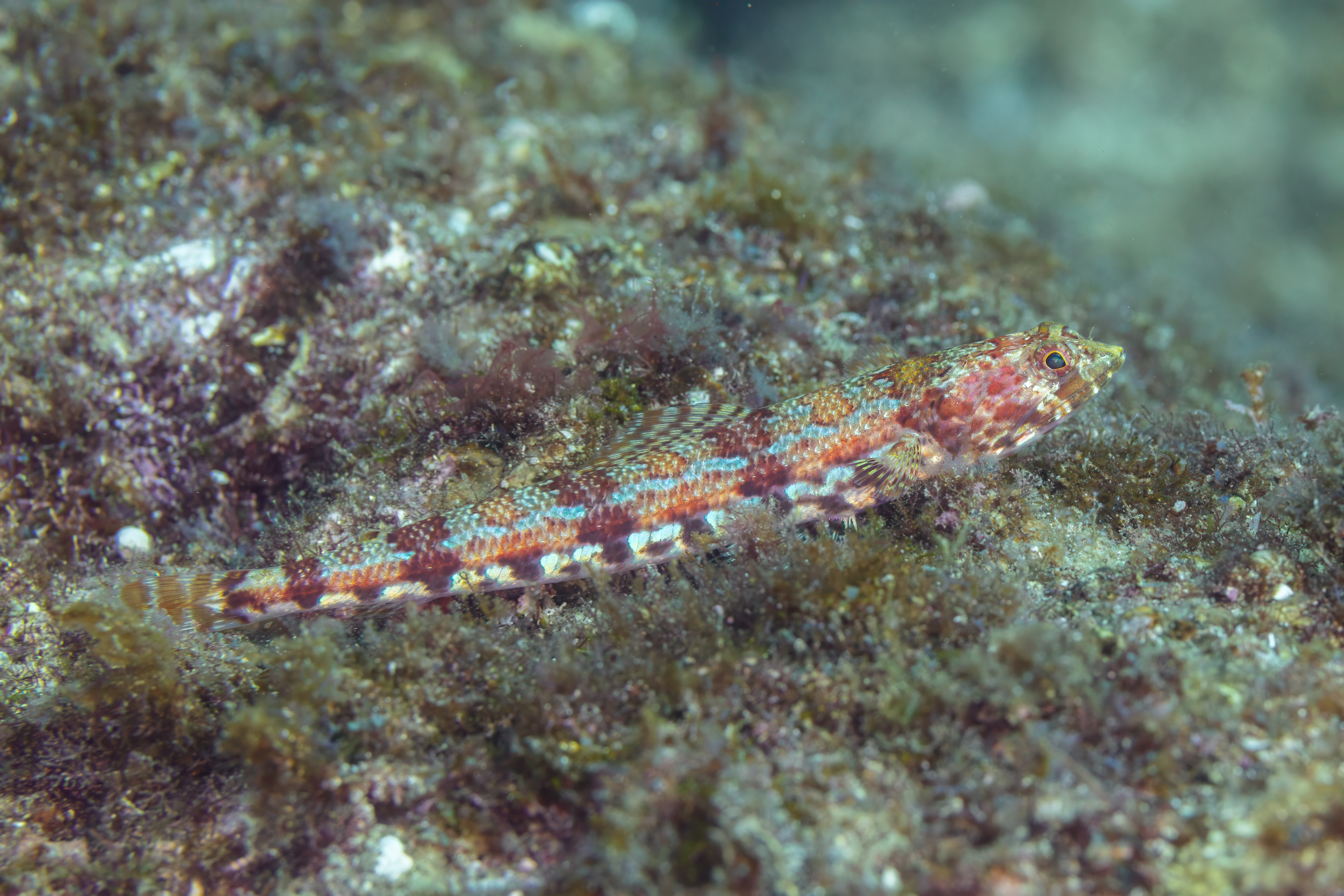

Scientific classification
- Kingdom: Animalia
- Phylum: Chordata
- Class: Actinopterygii
- Order: Aulopiformes
- Family: Synodontidae
- Genus: Synodus
- Species: S. lacertinus

Binomial name
- Synodus lacertinus C. H. Gilbert, 1890

= Sauro lizardfish =

Species of fish

The Sauro lizardfish (Synodus lacertinus) is a type of lizardfish that lives mainly in the eastern Pacific Ocean.

== Information ==
The Sauro lizardfish is native to the areas of eastern Pacific Ocean, from the US-Mexican border, on outer coast of Baja California, throughout the Gulf of California to Chile, the Galapagos, Cocos, and the Malpelo Islands. There has been no recorded information of the population of this species declining. There are shrimp hatcheries that might affect the population of the Sauro lizardfish. This species commonly occurs on sandy bottoms or sand patches that are around rocky reefs or boulder and gravel strewn slopes. The Sauro lizardfish is known to be found in a marine environment within a tropical climate. They are reef-associated in a common depth range of about 1 – 27 meters. The maximum recorded length of the Sauro lizardfish as an unsexed male is about 20 centimeters or about 7.87 inches. The average length of this species as an unsexed male is about 15 centimeters or about 5.9 inches. The Sauro lizardfish is recorded to live solitarily and not within a group. It also is known to be active at night while only showing eyes and mouth during the day by hiding in the sand. As prey swim by, it pounces from its spot in the sand. This species does not serve as any threat or harm to humans. They are not considered to be a species that should be kept in an aquarium or for commerce.

== Habitats ==
The Sauro Lizardfish is known to occupy the following countries:

- Chile
- Colombia
- Costa Rica
- Ecuador
- El Salvador
- Guatemala
- Honduras
- Mexico
- Nicaragua
- Panama
- Peru
- United States

== Notes ==
- Froese, Rainer; Pauly, Daniel (eds.). "Synodus lacertinus". FishBase. April 2012 version.
