= Synodus macrostigmus =

Conservation status
- Least Concern (IUCN 3.1)

Scientific classification
- Kingdom: Animalia
- Phylum: Chordata
- Class: Actinopterygii
- Order: Aulopiformes
- Family: Synodontidae
- Genus: Synodus
- Species: S. macrostigmus

Binomial name
- Synodus macrostigmus Frable, Luther & C. C. Baldwin, 2013

Species of fish

Synodus macrostigmus, commonly known as the largespot lizardfish, is a species of fish in the lizardfish family, Synodontidae, a basal ray-finned fish in the class Actinopterygii. It is native to the warm temperate western Atlantic Ocean and the Gulf of Mexico.

== Description ==
Synodus macrostigmus is an elongate, cylindrical fish growing to a standard length of about 21 cm (8 in). The dorsal fin has eleven to twelve soft rays and the anal fin has eleven soft rays. The head and dorsal surface is grey to greenish-brown and the ventral surface is pale. The six to eight dark brown markings along the lateral line are connected dorsally by saddles, and there are narrow orange-yellow streaks between these dorsally breaking into orange-yellow blobs ventrally. There is a large, dark brown patch on the scapular region, which gives this species its name, and other dark pigmentation on the head and caudal fin.

== Distribution ==
Synodus macrostigmus occurs in the warm western Atlantic Ocean and the Gulf of Mexico but does not seem to occur in the Caribbean Sea. Its range extends in the Atlantic from Bald Head Island, North Carolina to Jacksonville, Florida, and in the Gulf of Mexico from the Florida Keys to Alabama, and from the northern and western sides of the Yucatán Peninsula. It may be more widespread in the Gulf of Mexico than is currently known. It is a benthic fish and lives over the continental shelf, its depth range being between 28 and 194 m (92 and 636 ft).

== Status ==
Synodus macrostigmus is not of any commercial importance but is caught as bycatch in fisheries trawling for shrimps on the continental shelf, although this is not thought to significantly impact populations. The fish has a wide range and the International Union for Conservation of Nature has assessed its conservation status as being of "least concern".
