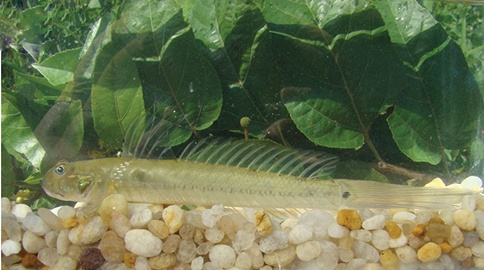
- Gobionellus oceanicus

Scientific classification
- Kingdom: Animalia
- Phylum: Chordata
- Class: Actinopterygii
- Order: Gobiiformes
- Family: Oxudercidae
- Subfamily: Gobionellinae
- Genus: Gobionellus; Girard, 1858

Type species
- Gobius lanceolatus Bloch, 1783

Synonyms
- Congruogobius Ginsburg, 1953; Gobatinus Ginsburg, 1953; Gobatus Ginsburg, 1932; Gobica Ginsburg, 1932; Gobidus Ginsburg, 1953; Gobiex Ginsburg, 1932; Paroxyurichthys Bleeker, 1876; Smaragdus Poey, 1860

= Gobionellus =

Genus of fishes

Gobionellus is a genus of gobies native to fresh, marine and brackish waters along the Atlantic and Pacific coasts of the Americas.

== Species ==
There are currently seven recognized species in this genus:

- Gobionellus daguae (C. H. Eigenmann, 1918) (Choco goby)
- Gobionellus liolepis (Meek & Hildebrand, 1928)
- Gobionellus microdon (C. H. Gilbert, 1892) (Estuary goby)
- Gobionellus munizi Vergara R., 1978
- Gobionellus occidentalis (Boulenger, 1909)
- Gobionellus oceanicus (Pallas, 1770) (Highfin goby)
- Gobionellus stomatus Starks, 1913
