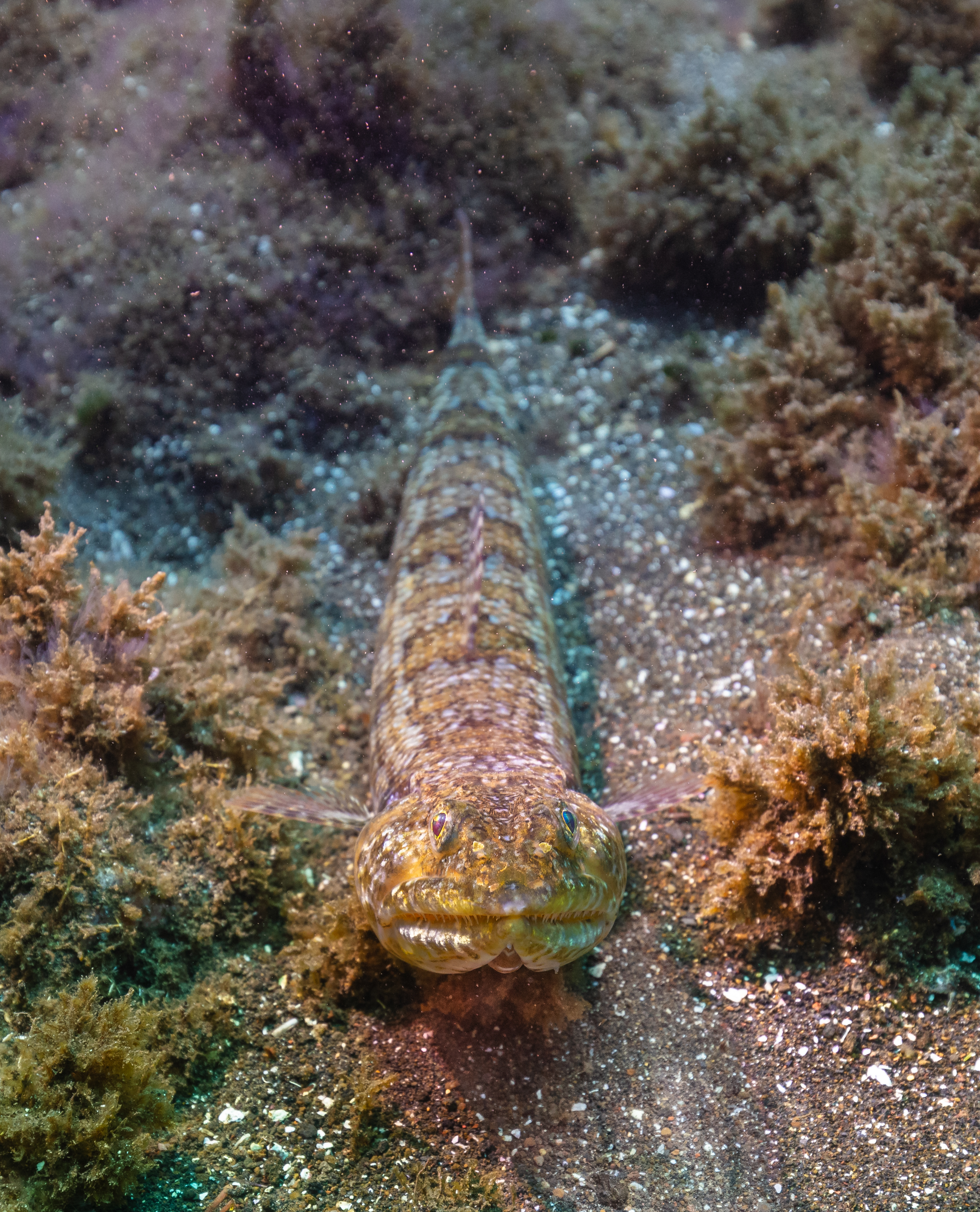

Conservation status
- Least Concern (IUCN 3.1)

Scientific classification
- Kingdom: Animalia
- Phylum: Chordata
- Class: Actinopterygii
- Order: Aulopiformes
- Family: Synodontidae
- Genus: Synodus
- Species: S. synodus

Binomial name
- Synodus synodus (Linnaeus, 1758)

= Diamond lizardfish =

Species of fish

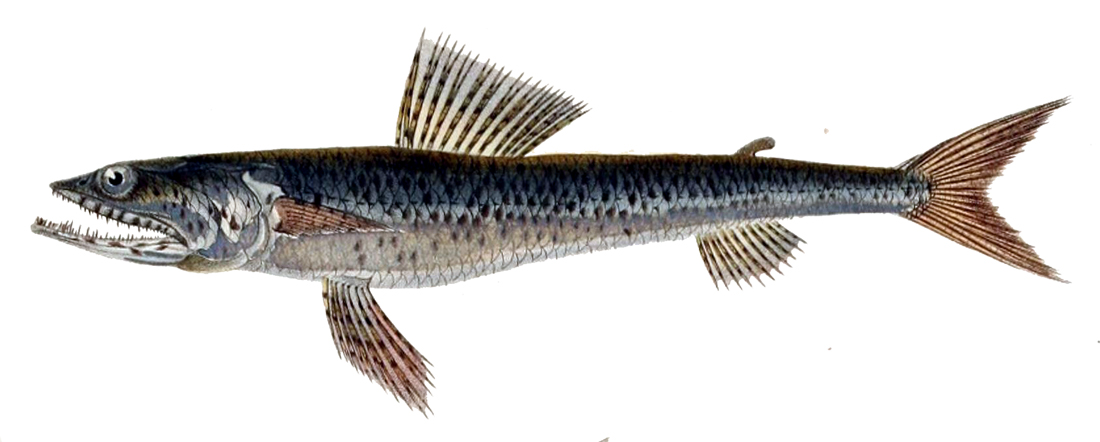
Illustration

The diamond lizardfish (Synodus synodus) is a species of lizardfish that lives in tropical and subtropical waters of the Atlantic Ocean.

== Information ==
The diamond lizardfish has been found within marine environments within reef-associated areas. This species lives generally in the depth range of 2 – 35 m. The maximum recorded length of the diamond lizardfish as an unsexed or male was about 33 cm (1.1 ft) long. The common length of this species is about 20 cm or 8 inches. It is commonly identified by the dark red stripes on its back. The diamond lizardfish is commonly found in shallow, inshore waters, and is known to prefer to stay on hard surfaces rather than sandy bottoms. It also can be found in reef areas and also goes into open shelf water as deep as 90 m. This species is edible and has been recorded to taste relatively good, but it is not commonly eaten. The diamond lizardfish is occasionally caught with artisanal gear used by humans. This species serves as no threat to humans. This species cannot be kept in an aquarium or traded for commercial usage.

== Distribution ==
The diamond lizardfish ranges from North Carolina (U.S.) to Uruguay in the Americas, and is also distributed through numerous Atlantic Islands in the Caribbean, Bermuda, Saint Helena and Ascension Island, São Tomé, Senegal, and the Macaronesia (Cape Verde, Canary Islands, Savage Islands and Madeira).
