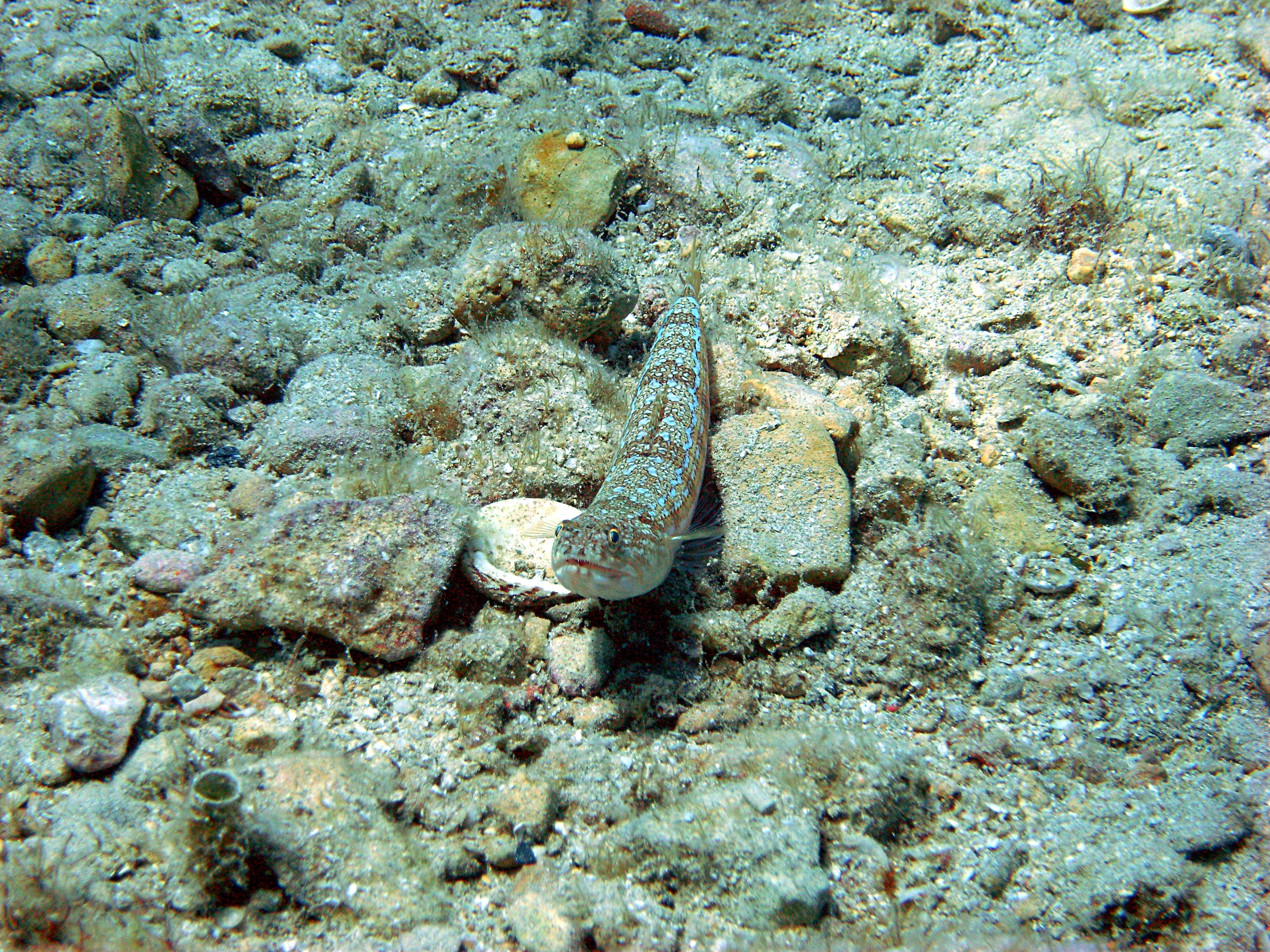

Conservation status
- Least Concern (IUCN 3.1)

Scientific classification
- Kingdom: Animalia
- Phylum: Chordata
- Class: Actinopterygii
- Division: Teleostei
- Order: Aulopiformes
- Family: Synodontidae
- Genus: Synodus
- Species: S. saurus

Binomial name
- Synodus saurus (Linnaeus, 1758)

= Atlantic lizardfish =

Species of fish

The Atlantic lizardfish (Synodus saurus), also known as the bluestripe lizardfish, is a species of lizardfish that lives primarily in the eastern Atlantic Ocean.

== Distribution and habitat ==
The Atlantic lizardfish is known to be found in a marine environment within a general demersal depth range of about 400 meters. They are more specifically found in a depth range of about 20 meters. This species is native to a subtropical climate. The maximum recorded length of the Atlantic lizardfish as an unsexed male is about 40 centimeters (16 inches). The distribution of this species occupies the areas of Eastern Atlantic, Morocco, Cape Verde, Azores, Mediterranean, Western Atlantic, Bermuda, Bahamas, Lesser Antilles, and the Leeward Islands. This species is mainly known to be found in insular waters and on top of sandy or sand-rock bottoms.

== Ecology ==
The diet of the Atlantic lizardfish mainly includes other species of fish, but it is known to also feed occasionally on other animals. The Atlantic lizardfish can be found occupying waters around islands. The Atlantic lizardfish keeps itself hidden and camouflaged by burrowing itself in the sand. While it is burrowed in the sand, this species reveals its eyes so that it can watch its prey and pounce when food is available.

== Notes ==
- Froese, Rainer; Pauly, Daniel (eds.). "Synodus saurus". FishBase. April 2012 version.
