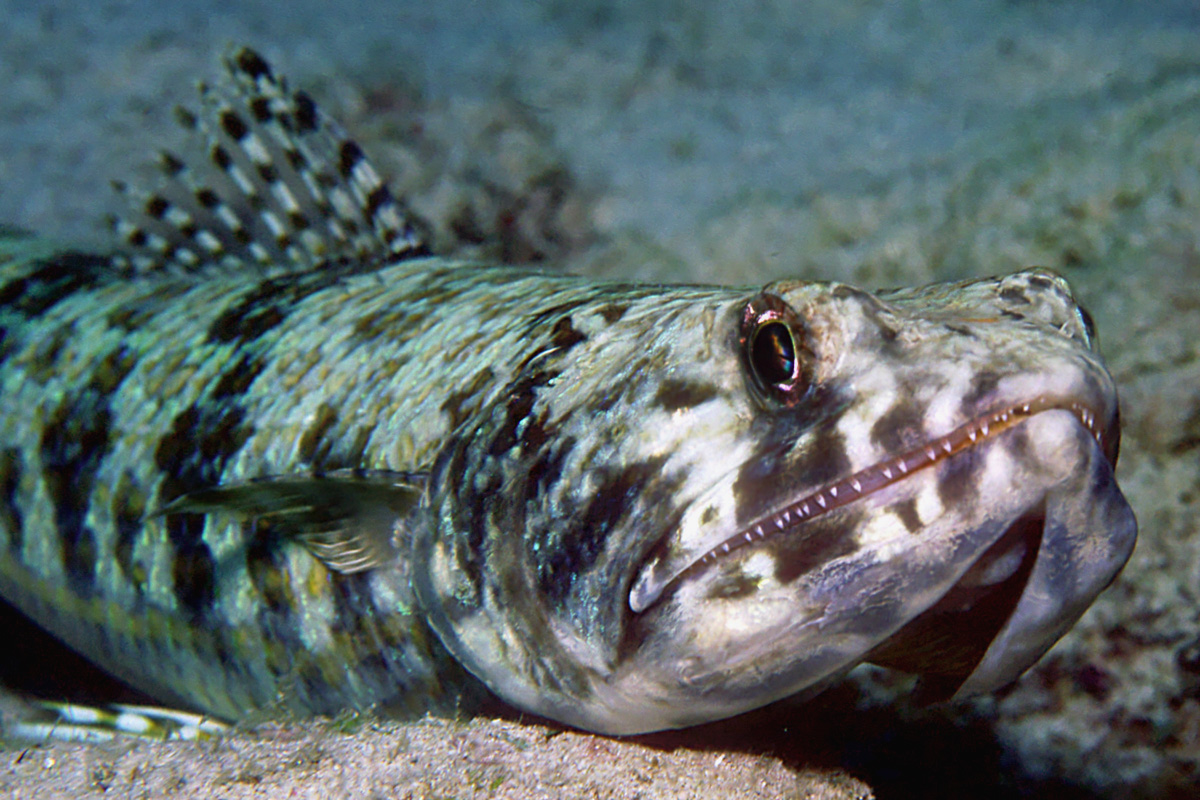
- Synodus intermedius

Scientific classification
- Kingdom: Animalia
- Phylum: Chordata
- Class: Actinopterygii
- Division: Teleostei
- Order: Aulopiformes
- Suborder: Synodontoidei
- Family: Synodontidae; T. N. Gill, 1862

Genera
- Synodus; Trachinocephalus; †Argillichthys; †Ausonasynodus; †Labrophagus

= Synodontidae =

Lizardfishes Temporal range: Eocene–recent

Family of fishes

The Synodontidae or lizardfishes (Note: (or typical lizardfish to distinguish them from the Bathysauridae and Pseudotrichonotidae)) are benthic (bottom-dwelling) marine and estuarine bony fishes that belong to the aulopiform fish order, a diverse group of marine ray-finned fish consisting of some 15 extant and several prehistoric families. This family alone constitutes the suborder Synodontoidei. They are found in tropical and subtropical marine waters throughout the world. It formerly included Harpadontidae as a subfamily, but it has been separated into the different suborder, Aulopoidei.

Lizardfishes are generally small, although the largest species measures about 60 cm (24 in) in length. They have slender, somewhat cylindrical bodies, and heads that superficially resemble those of lizards. The dorsal fin is located in the middle of the back, and accompanied by a small adipose fin placed closer to the tail. They have mouths full of sharp teeth, even on the tongue.

Lizardfishes are benthic animals that live in shallow coastal waters; even the deepest-dwelling species of lizardfish live in waters no more than 400 m (1,300 ft) deep. Some species in the subfamily Harpadontinae live in brackish estuaries. They prefer sandy environments, and typically have body colours that help to camouflage them in such environments.

The larvae of lizardfishes are free-swimming. They are distinguished by the presence of black blotches in their guts, clearly visible through their transparent, scaleless skin.

== Taxonomy ==
Three genera of the Synodontidae are known to inhabit the western Atlantic, including Synodus, represented by six species, Saurida, represented by four species, and Trachinocephalus, represented by a single species. The six species comprising the genus Synodus are S. intermedius, S. saurus, S. synodus, S. foetens, S. bondi, and S. macrostigmus. The four species comprising the genus Saurida are S. umeyoshii, S. pseudotumbil, S. undosquamis, and S. tumbil. The single species of Trachinocephalus is T. myops. The extinct Argillichthys is represented only by a single species, A. toombsi, from the Eocene-aged London Clay formation, as is the co-occurring Labrophagus esocinus. The extinct Ausonasynodus is known from the Late Eocene of Spain.

== See also ==
- Bombay duck
- Deepsea lizardfish
- USS Lizardfish (a US submarine)
