= Saurida eso =

Scientific classification
- Kingdom: Animalia
- Phylum: Chordata
- Class: Actinopterygii
- Order: Aulopiformes
- Family: Harpadontidae
- Genus: Saurida
- Species: S. eso

Binomial name
- Saurida eso Jordan & Herre, 1907

Synonyms
- Saurida microlepis H. W. Wu & Ki. Fu. Wang, 1931

Species of fish

Saurida eso is a species of lizardfish that lives coastal waters throughout the Pacific Ocean.

== Size ==
The average length of Saurida eso as an unsexed male is about 45 centimetres (18 in).

== Habitat ==
S. eso can be found in shallow waters and muddy bottoms.

== Location ==
S. eso can be found in shallow coastal waters along the Pacific coast of Asia, and off the coast of the Pacific Northwest of North America.
