= Harpadon translucens =

Scientific classification
- Kingdom: Animalia
- Phylum: Chordata
- Class: Actinopterygii
- Order: Aulopiformes
- Family: Harpadontidae
- Genus: Harpadon
- Species: H. translucens

Binomial name
- Harpadon translucens Saville-Kent, 1889

Species of fish

Harpadon translucens, the glassy Bombay duck, is a species of lizardfish that lives mainly in the Indo-West Pacific.

The glassy Bombay duck is known to be found in estuaries with a mix of salt and fresh waters. The glassy Bombay duck is found at a demersal depth range of about 1 – 75 m. This species is native to a tropical climate. The maximum recorded length of the glassy Bombay duck as an unsexed male is about 70 cm (28 in) in length. It is commonly found in the areas of Indo-West Pacific, Arafura Sea, northwestern Australia, and Papua New Guinea. This species is known to occupy bays and estuaries. Another common name for this species is the ghost grinner.
