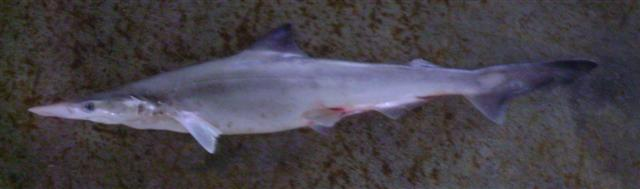

Conservation status
- Near Threatened (IUCN 3.1)

Scientific classification
- Kingdom: Animalia
- Phylum: Chordata
- Class: Chondrichthyes
- Subclass: Elasmobranchii
- Division: Selachii
- Order: Carcharhiniformes
- Family: Carcharhinidae
- Genus: Scoliodon
- Species: S. macrorhynchos

Binomial name
- Scoliodon macrorhynchos (Bleeker, 1852)

Synonyms
- Carcharias macrorhynchos (Bleeker, 1852)

= Pacific spadenose shark =

Species of shark

The Pacific spadenose shark (Scoliodon macrorhynchos) is a species of requiem shark, in the family Carcharhinidae. It was once regarded as conspecific to the spadenose shark (S. laticaudus).

== Virology ==
Pacific spadenose sharks are identified as hosts of the Flavivirus Wenzhou shark flavivirus. While currently unknown if Wenzhou shark flavivirus causes disease in infected shark hosts, it is thought that the virus moves horizontally from the gazami crab Portunus trituberculatus to shark hosts in a manner similar to other Flavivirus infections such as Dengue virus, which cycle horizontally between arthropod (mosquito) and vertebrate hosts.
