= Harpadon erythraeus =

Scientific classification
- Kingdom: Animalia
- Phylum: Chordata
- Class: Actinopterygii
- Order: Aulopiformes
- Family: Harpadontidae
- Genus: Harpadon
- Species: H. erythraeus

Binomial name
- Harpadon erythraeus Klausewitz, 1983

Species of fish

Harpadon erythraeus is a species of lizardfish that live mainly in the Western Indian Ocean.
