= Harpadon squamosus =

Scientific classification
- Kingdom: Animalia
- Phylum: Chordata
- Class: Actinopterygii
- Order: Aulopiformes
- Family: Harpadontidae
- Genus: Harpadon
- Species: H. squamosus

Binomial name
- Harpadon squamosus (Alcock, 1891)

Species of fish

Harpadon squamosus, the scaly lizardfish, is a species of lizardfish that lives mainly in the coasts around India.
