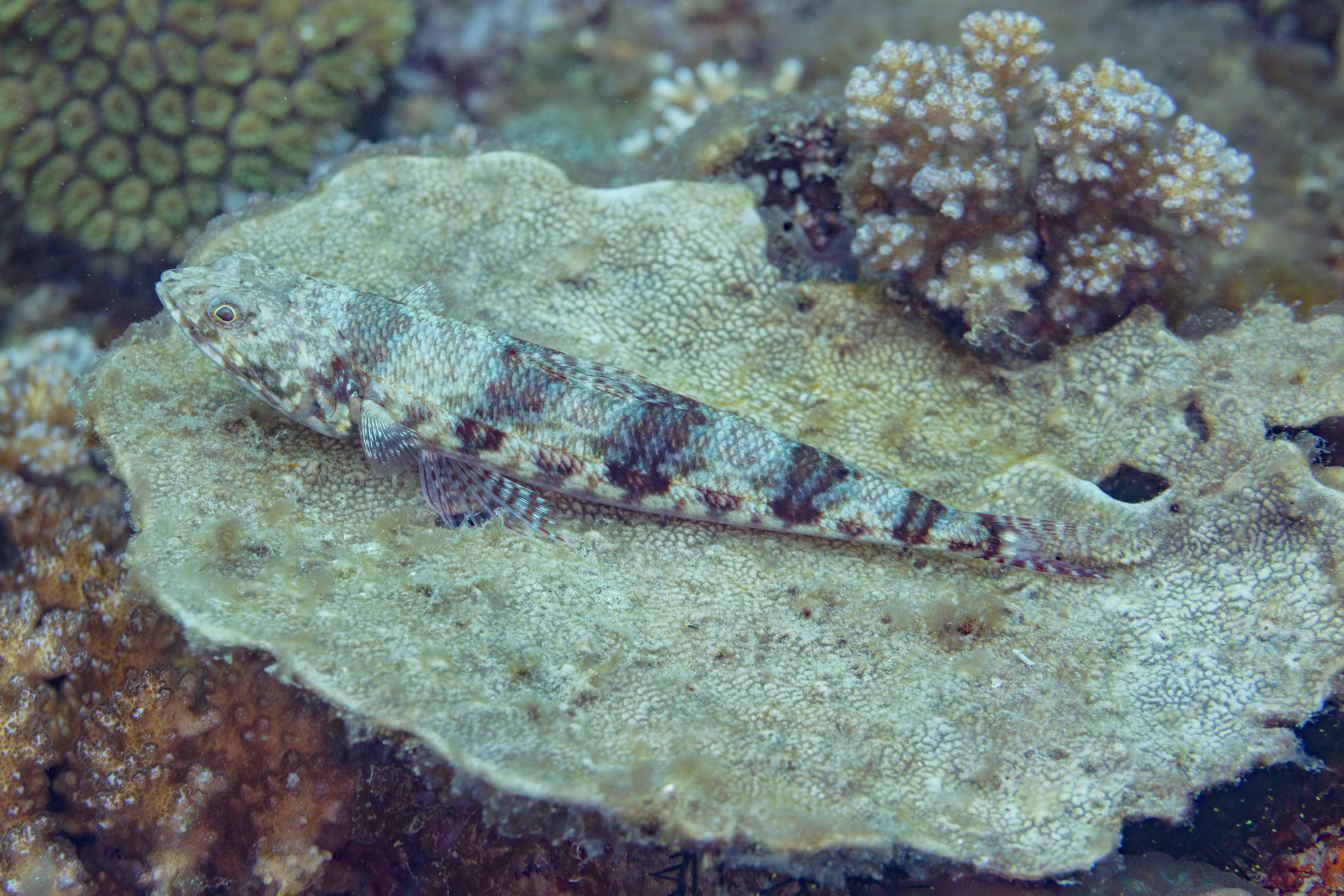

Scientific classification
- Kingdom: Animalia
- Phylum: Chordata
- Class: Actinopterygii
- Order: Aulopiformes
- Family: Harpadontidae
- Genus: Saurida
- Species: S. nebulosa

Binomial name
- Saurida nebulosa Valenciennes, 1850

= Clouded lizardfish =

Species of fish

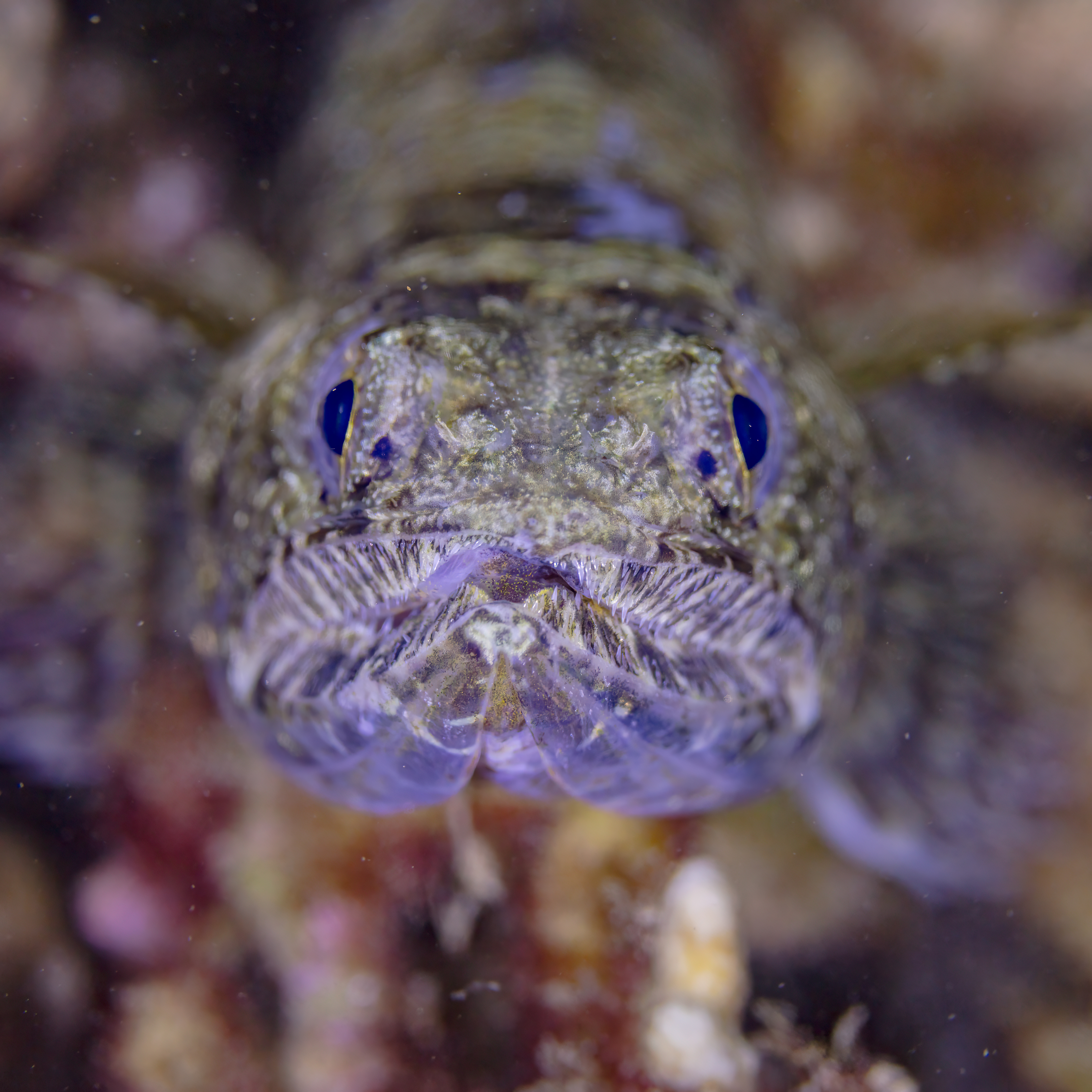
Front view

The clouded lizardfish (Saurida nebulosa) is a species of lizardfish that lives mainly in the south Pacific Ocean.

== Biology ==
The clouded lizardfish is known to eat other fish. They are a species that camouflage in order to wait for their prey. At times they will pop their heads out of the sand. It is also recorded that they have one or two lines of teeth on their jaw.

== Names ==
The common names of the clouded lizardfish include:

- Nebulous lizardfish
- Clouded saury
- Clouded grinner
- Blotched lizardfish
- Blotched saury
- Blotched grinner

== Size ==
The average size of an unsexed male is about 16.5 centimeters.

== Habitat ==
The clouded lizardfish can be found in reef-based environments in tropical climates. They are common to the areas of sand, mud, rock, eel-grass habitats, mangroves and seagrass beds, near streams, and river mouths. They are native to:

- Mauritius to the Society Islands
- North to the Hawaiian Islands
- South to Sydney Harbor
- New South Wales, Australia
