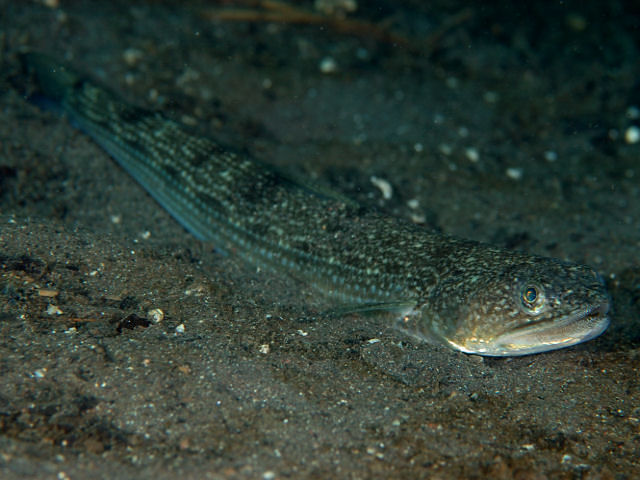

Scientific classification
- Kingdom: Animalia
- Phylum: Chordata
- Class: Actinopterygii
- Division: Teleostei
- Order: Aulopiformes
- Family: Harpadontidae
- Genus: Saurida
- Species: S. elongata

Binomial name
- Saurida elongata (Temminck & Schlegel, 1846)

= Slender lizardfish =

Species of fish

The Slender lizardfish (Saurida elongata) is a species of lizardfish that lives mainly in the Northwest Pacific.
