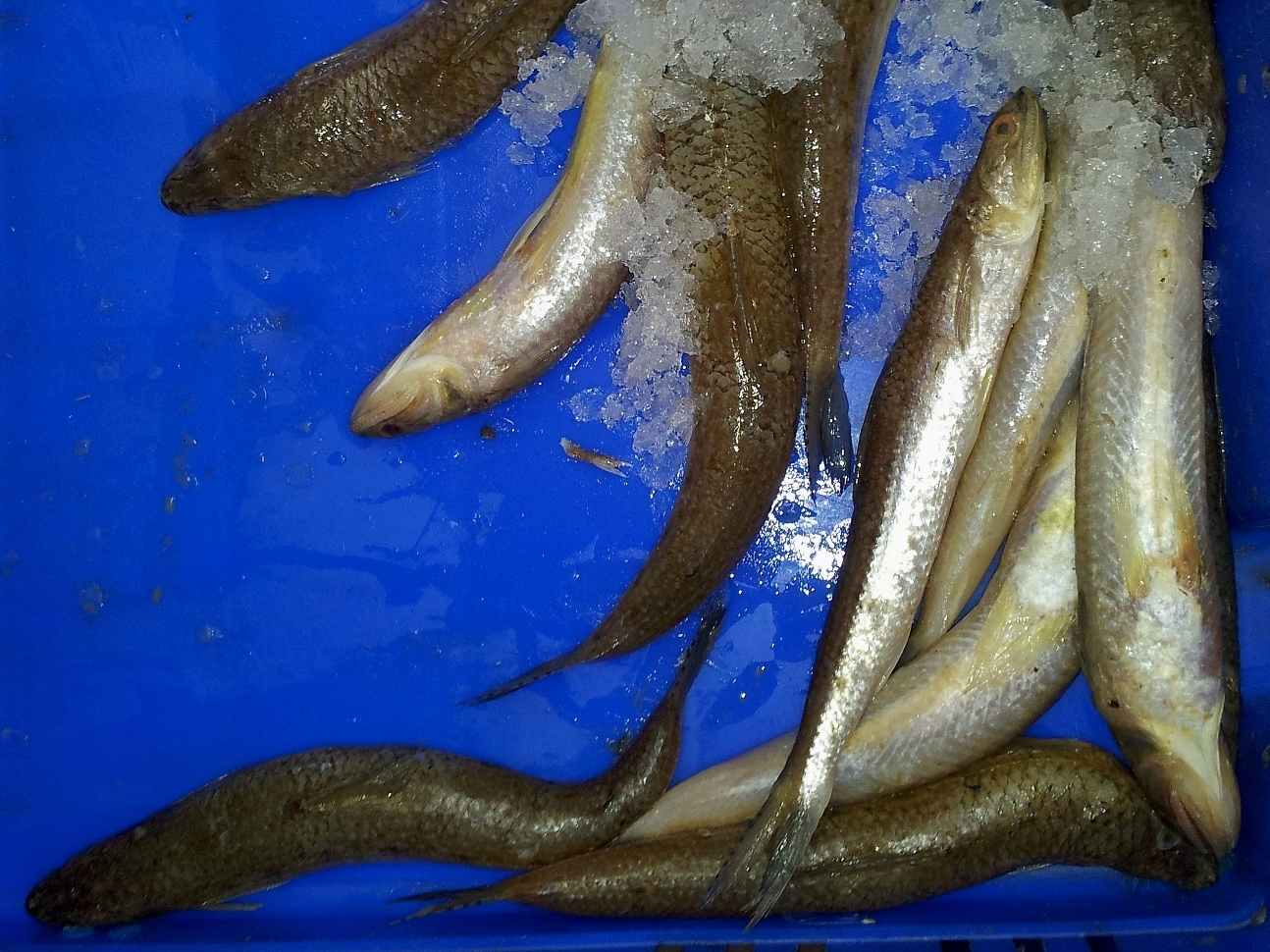

Conservation status
- Least Concern (IUCN 3.1)

Scientific classification
- Kingdom: Animalia
- Phylum: Chordata
- Class: Actinopterygii
- Order: Aulopiformes
- Family: Synodontidae
- Genus: Saurida
- Species: S. lessepsianus

Binomial name
- Saurida lessepsianus Russell, Golani & Tikochinski, 2015

= Lessepsian lizardfish =

Species of fish

The Lessepsian lizardfish (Saurida lessepsianus) is a species of marine ray-finned fish belonging to the family Synodontidae, the lizardfishes. This species was first formally described in 2015 by Russell, Golani and Tikochinski from the Israeli part of the Red Sea. This species is found in the Indian Ocean from South Africa north to the Red Sea and east to the Andaman Sea. It has entered the Mediterranean Sea, probably through the Suez Canal as a Lessepsian migrant and is now a commercially important species for fisheries in the eastern part of that sea. This species was previously thought to have been either S. undosquamis or S. macrolepis.
