= Orangemouth lizardfish =

Conservation status
- Least Concern (IUCN 3.1)

Scientific classification
- Kingdom: Animalia
- Phylum: Chordata
- Class: Actinopterygii
- Division: Teleostei
- Order: Aulopiformes
- Family: Harpadontidae
- Genus: Saurida
- Species: S. flamma

Binomial name
- Saurida flamma Maples, 1982

Species of fish

The orangemouth lizardfish (Saurida flamma) is a species of lizardfish that lives mainly in the Eastern Central Pacific.

== Species description ==
Saurida flamma is named for the reddish-orange colored bands on its mouth. It has pale and light brown splotches all over its body, with three dark brown bands towards the caudal fin. The body of the species is elongated and cylindrical, mildly depressed on the head and caudal peduncle. The scales are large, cycloid, and easily shed; they are also found on the cheek and operculum. This species typically has 54 or more lateral-line scales, 52 or more vertebrae, and generally 14 or more pectoral fin rays. The jaws have numerous canine-like teeth, typically arranged in three rows, and they remain visible even when the mouth is closed. S. flamma maximum length is 30.5 cm. It is easily distinguishable from other species in the genus Saurida due to its distinct reddish-orange mouth.

== Common names ==
The common names from different languages of S. flamma include the following:

- Hawaiian : 'Ulae
- English : Orangemouth lizardfish, orangemouth saury, redmouth lizardfish

== Systematics ==
The species belongs to the family Synodontidae; commonly known as lizardfishes. They're named due to their reptile-like head. The name “flamma” comes from the latin word for “fire” due to the distinctive coloration on its mouth and body which suggested its common name, orangemouth lizardfish. The family Synodontidae consists of four genera (Harpadon, Saurida, Synodus, and Trachinocephalus) which are morphologically distinguished by their physical traits. S. flamma belongs to the genus Saurida. This genus is notable within family Synodontidae due to having nine pelvic rays, and multiple rows of teeth visible in both jaws when the mouth is closed, unlike the other genera, which show only a single row of teeth.

== Distribution ==
The fish of the family Synodontidae are bottom-dwelling species widely found across tropical, subtropical, and temperate waters, ranging from the continental shelf to the upper continental slope. S. flamma can be found in deep reef habitats, particularly in areas where sandy channels or sandy pockets that are connected to rocky or coral ledges. S. flamma is known to inhabit the waters of the Hawaiian and Pitcairn Island, both located in the Pacific Ocean, with a distribution primarily concentrated in Hawaiian waters. Occurrences of S. flamma have also been documented on Mararison Island, Philippines, in 1995.

== Life history ==
The information on lizardfish reproduction is very sparse. However, spawning behavior has been documented in Synodus ulae, a species within the same family. It was found that S. ulae perform dusk spawning where males and females of similar size display numerous courtship behaviors and release a cloud of gametes at dusk. There are no studies on age or growth on S. flamma. Consequently, studies on the age and growth of the Brushtooth lizardfish, a species within the same family, have been conducted in Taiwan and various other regions, utilizing different aging structures including otoliths, scales, vertebrae, and length-frequency analyses. Lizardfishes' are benthic predators. Once believed to occupy a mid-trophic position and rely on ambush predation, adult lizardfish are known to occupy high trophic positions as active hunters, preying on other predatory fish.

== Conservation status ==
S. flamma and the majority of the species under the same genus are stable in abundance and are classified as "least concern" by the IUCN Red list. However, with the exception of Saurida tumbil, a species within the same family, recently has been found under threat. Research has identified several trait changes during the individual developmental process of S. tumbil, including reduced body size, earlier onset of maturity, and a marked decline in population abundance in the Beibu Gulf, largely attributed to overfishing.

There are no records of S. flamma in fisheries; however, S. tumbil is a commercially valuable fish to many countries, due to its importance as a major food resource. Although the species is utilized as a food resource by humans, it is also commonly used in experimental research. The species has been collected from many habitats around Oahu for use as specimens. There are no records of S. flamma or related species regarding their cultural significance to humans.

== Notes ==
- Froese, Rainer; Pauly, Daniel (eds.). "Saurida flamma". FishBase. April 2012 version.
