= Shortfin saury =

Scientific classification
- Kingdom: Animalia
- Phylum: Chordata
- Class: Actinopterygii
- Order: Aulopiformes
- Family: Synodontidae
- Genus: Saurida
- Species: S. argentea

Binomial name
- Saurida argentea W. J. Macleay, 1881

Species of fish

The shortfin saury, Saurida argentea, is a species of lizardfish that lives mainly in the western Pacific Ocean.

== Information ==
The shortfin saury is known to be found in a marine environment within a demersal depth range of about 1 – 70 meters. This species is native to a tropical environment. The maximum recorded length of the shortfin saury as an unsexed male is about 29 centimeters or about 11.4 inches. The species is known to be found in the areas of Western Pacific, the Gulf of Thailand, and northeastern Australia. It is common to find this species occupying coastal waters, sand, and mud bottoms. The human uses of this species include minor commercial use. This species is known to serve as no threat to humans and they are considered to be harmless.

== Common names ==
The common names of the shortfin saury in different languages is as follows:

- Al-alibot : Ilokano
- Balanghuten : Tagalog
- Balanghuten : Visayan
- Basasong : Pangasinan
- Bekut laut : Malay (bahasa Melayu)
- Bubule : Tagalog
- Butong-panday : Bikol
- Cá Mối thường : Vietnamese (Tiếng Việt)
- Chonor : Malay (bahasa Melayu)
- Conor : Malay (bahasa Melayu)
- Daldalag : Ilokano
- Hai la : Malay (bahasa Melayu)
- Kalaso : Tagalog
- Karaho : Cebuano
- Karaho : Hiligaynon
- Kortfinnet øglefisk : Danish (dansk)
- Kuti-kuti : Agutaynen
- Mengkarong : Malay (bahasa Melayu)
- Mengkerong : Malay (bahasa Melayu)
- Short-finned lizardfish : English
- Short-finned saury : English
- Shortfin lizardfish : English
- Shortfin saury : English
- Talad : Waray-waray
- Talho : Waray-waray
- Tamangkah : Chavacano
- Tigbasbay : Maranao/Samal/Tao Sug
- Tigbasbay : Tagalog
- Tiki : Bikol
- Tiki : Davawenyo
- Tiki : Wolof (Wollof)
- Tiki-tiki : Cebuano
- Tiki-tiki : Kuyunon
- Tiki-tiki : Tagalog
- Tiki-tiki : Visayan
- Tuko : Tagalog
- Ubi : Malay (bahasa Melayu)
- 短臂蛇鯔 : Mandarin Chinese
- 短臂蛇鲻 : Mandarin Chinese

== Notes ==
- Froese, Rainer; Pauly, Daniel (eds.). "Saurida argentea". FishBase. April 2012 version.
