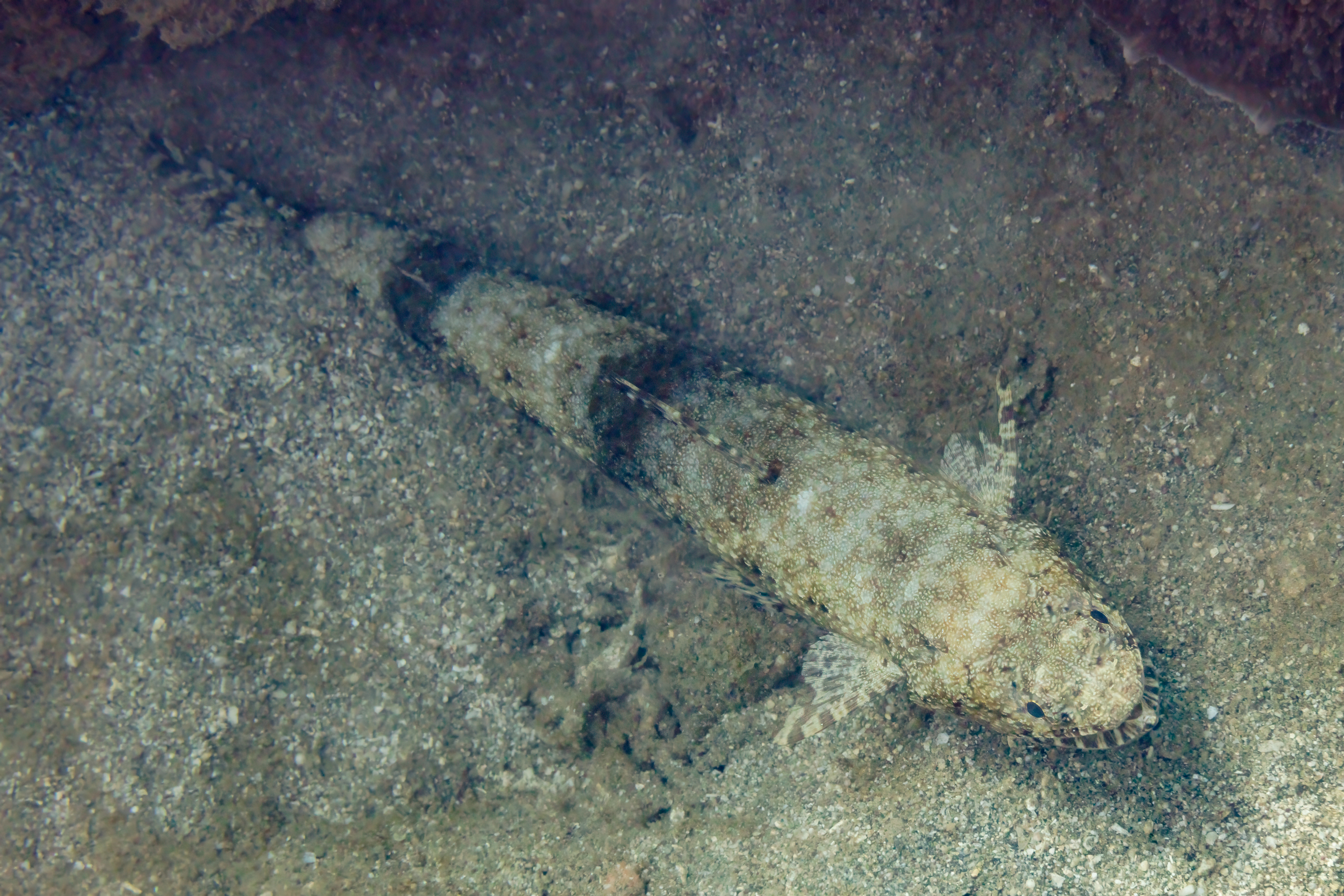

Conservation status
- Least Concern (IUCN 3.1)

Scientific classification
- Kingdom: Animalia
- Phylum: Chordata
- Class: Actinopterygii
- Order: Aulopiformes
- Family: Synodontidae
- Genus: Saurida
- Species: S. gracilis

Binomial name
- Saurida gracilis (Quoy & Gaimard, 1824)

= Gracile lizardfish =

Species of fish

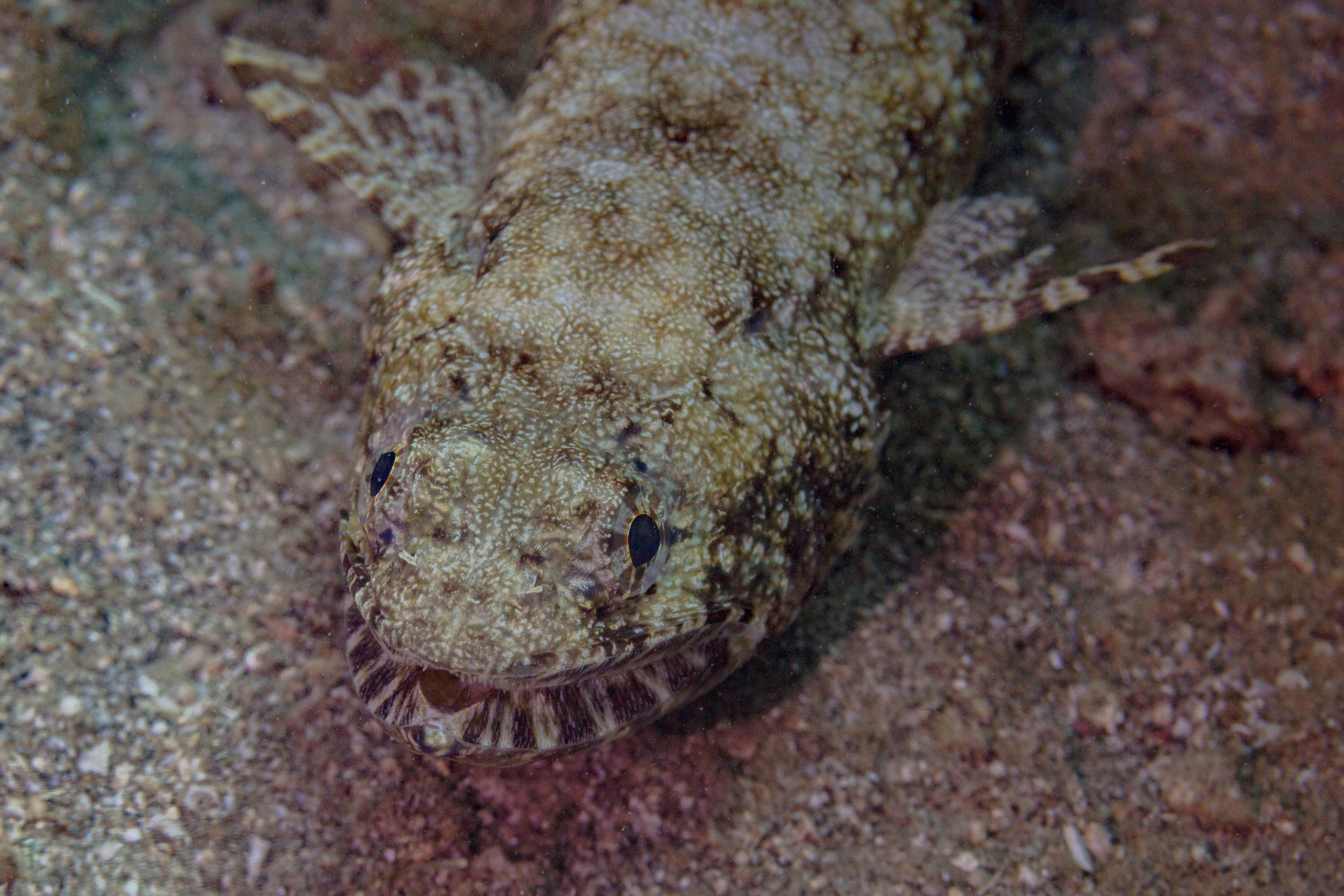
Front view

The gracile lizardfish (Saurida gracilis) is a species of lizardfish which lives mainly in the Indo-Pacific region.

== Information ==
The gracile lizardfish is known to be found in a marine environment within a reef-associated area. They live in a benthic depth range of 1–12 m (3.3–39.4 ft). This species is native to a tropical climate. The maximum length of the gracile lizardfish as an unsexed male has reached about 32 cm (12.6 in). It is common for this species to occupy the areas of Indo-Pacific, Red Sea, East Africa, Hawaiian, Marquesan and Ducie islands, north to the Ryukyu and Ogasawara islands, south to the Great Barrier Reef, Lord Howe Island, and Rapa. The gracile lizardfish inhabits sand, silty reefs, shallow lagoons, reef flats, and sheltered seaward reefs. The diet of the gracile lizardfish includes other fish. The species is recorded to be active at night. It is also common to find this species of fish solitary and not in groups. This species is also commonly known as slender lizardfish. This species does not cause any harm or threat to humans.

== Notes ==
- Froese, Rainer; Pauly, Daniel (eds.). "Saurida gracilis". FishBase. April 2012 version.
