= Saurida filamentosa =

Scientific classification
- Kingdom: Animalia
- Phylum: Chordata
- Class: Actinopterygii
- Order: Aulopiformes
- Family: Synodontidae
- Genus: Saurida
- Species: S. filamentosa

Binomial name
- Saurida filamentosa J. D. Ogilby, 1910

Species of fish

Saurida filamentosa, the Threadfin saury, is a species of lizardfish that lives mainly in the Western Pacific.
