= Shortjaw saury =

Scientific classification
- Kingdom: Animalia
- Phylum: Chordata
- Class: Actinopterygii
- Order: Aulopiformes
- Family: Synodontidae
- Genus: Saurida
- Species: S. isarankurai

Binomial name
- Saurida isarankurai Shindo & Yamada, 1972

Species of lizardfish from the Pacific Ocean

The shortjaw saury (Saurida isarankurai) is a species of lizardfish that lives mainly in the Pacific Ocean.

== Information ==
S. isarankurai is known to be found in a marine environment within a demersal range. This species is native to a tropical environment. The average length of S. isarankurai is about 12 centimeters or about 4.72 inches. This species is native to the areas of Western Central Pacific and the Gulf of Thailand. They are known to be found on sandy or muddy bottoms. This species serves as no threat or harm to humans.

== Notes ==
- Froese, Rainer; Pauly, Daniel (eds.). "Saurida isarankurai". FishBase. April 2012 version.
