= Wanieso lizardfish =

Scientific classification
- Domain: Eukaryota
- Kingdom: Animalia
- Phylum: Chordata
- Class: Actinopterygii
- Order: Aulopiformes
- Family: Synodontidae
- Genus: Saurida
- Species: S. wanieso

Binomial name
- Saurida wanieso Shindo & Yamada, 1972

Species of fish

The Wanieso lizardfish (Saurida wanieso) or Wanieso saury, is a species of lizardfish that lives in the Indo-Pacific region.

== Information ==
The Wanieso lizardfish can be found in a marine environment within a demersal depth range. This species is native to a tropical climate. The maximum recorded length of this species as an unsexed male is about 65 centimeters or about 2.13 feet. This species has been recorded to weigh about 3.6 kilograms or about 7.937 pounds. The Wanieso lizardfish can be found on sandy bottoms within shallow water. This type of fish is used for diet for humans. People tend to use this fish for fish cakes and fish balls. The Wanieso lizardfish serves as no threat to humans and they are harmless. Humans use this species for fisheries and minor commercial uses. The Wanieso lizardfish can be identified by its elongated body that is brown with a white belly. It also has two rows of teeth on the anterior part of their teeth bands.

== Common names ==
The common names for S. wanieso in different languages is as follows:

- Mandarin Chinese : È shé zi
- Korean : T'um-bil-mae-t'ung
- English : Waneso lizardfish
- Wani-eso in Japanese (日本語)
- Japanese : Wanieso lizardfish
- English : Wanieso saury
- Mandarin Chinese : 鱷蛇鯔
- Mandarin Chinese : 鳄蛇鲻
- Korean : 툼빌매퉁이

== Notes ==
- Froese, Rainer; Pauly, Daniel (eds.). "Saurida wanieso". FishBase. April 2012 version.
