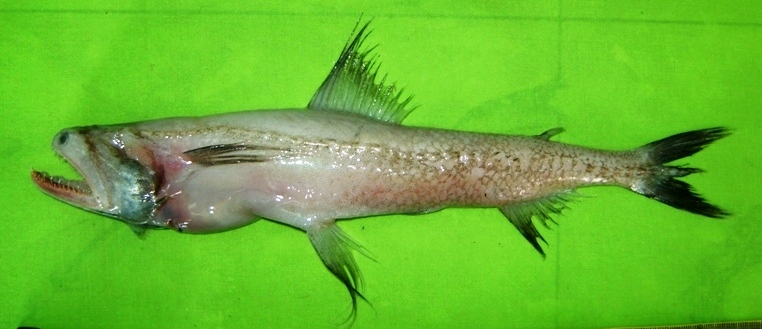
- Harpadon nehereus, Bombay duck

Scientific classification
- Kingdom: Animalia
- Phylum: Chordata
- Class: Actinopterygii
- Division: Teleostei
- Order: Aulopiformes
- Family: Harpadontidae
- Genus: Harpadon; Lesueur, 1825

= Harpadon =

Genus of fishes

Harpadon is a genus of bony fishes in the family Harpadontidae. The most famous member of this genus is the Bombay duck, H. nehereus, which is commercially fished to supply its use in Indian cuisine, especially in the area around Mumbai.

== Species ==
Seven species are placed in this genus:

- Harpadon erythraeus Klausewitz, 1983
- Harpadon microchir Günther, 1878
- Harpadon mortenseni Hardenberg, 1933
- Harpadon nehereus (F. Hamilton, 1822) (Bombay duck)
- Harpadon nudus Ganga & J. P. Thomas, 2015
- Harpadon squamosus (Alcock, 1891)
- Harpadon translucens Saville-Kent, 1889 (glassy Bombay duck)
