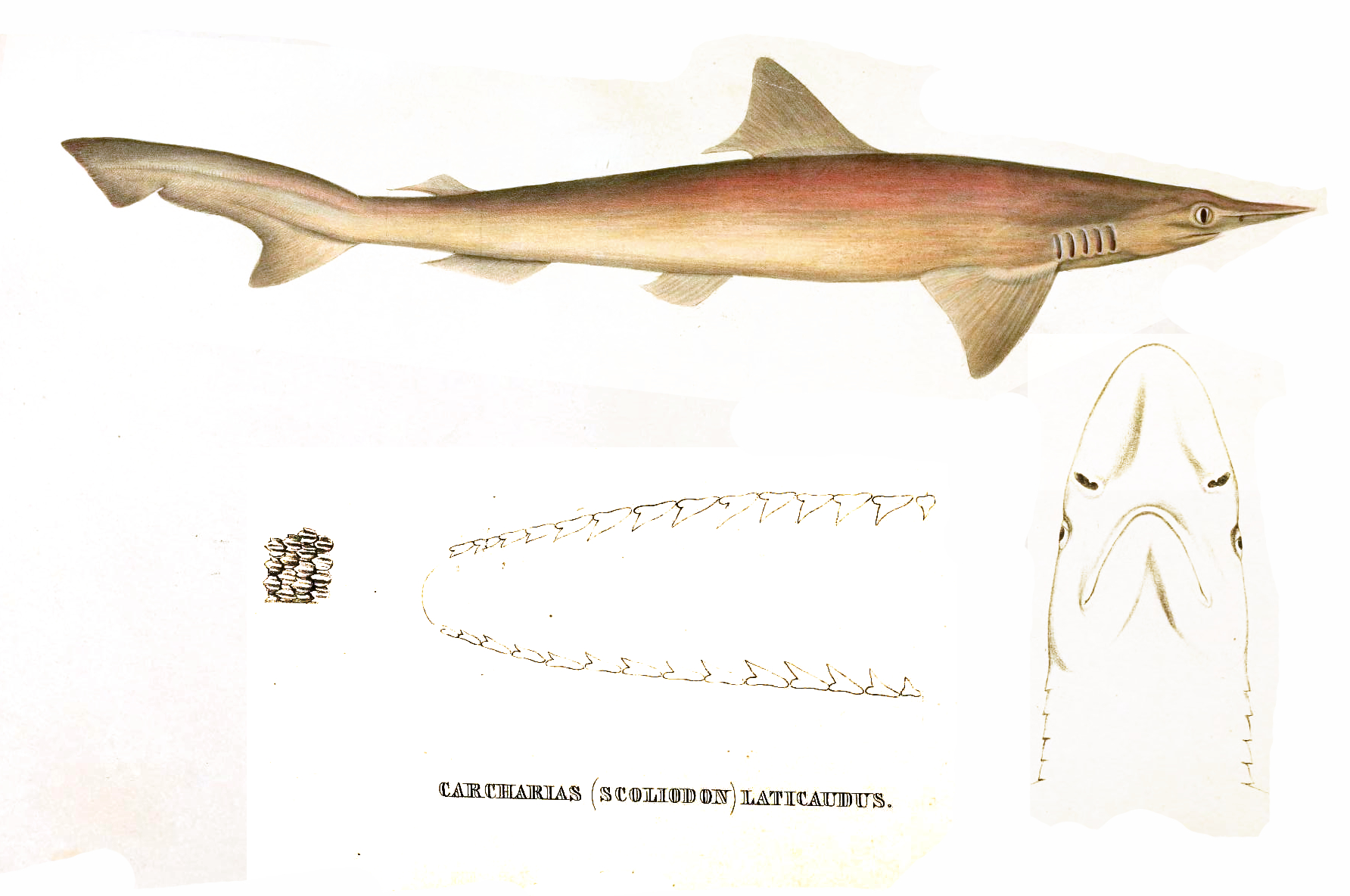

Conservation status
- Near Threatened (IUCN 3.1)

Scientific classification
- Kingdom: Animalia
- Phylum: Chordata
- Class: Chondrichthyes
- Subclass: Elasmobranchii
- Division: Selachii
- Order: Carcharhiniformes
- Family: Carcharhinidae
- Genus: Scoliodon
- Species: S. laticaudus

Binomial name
- Scoliodon laticaudus J. P. Müller & Henle, 1838
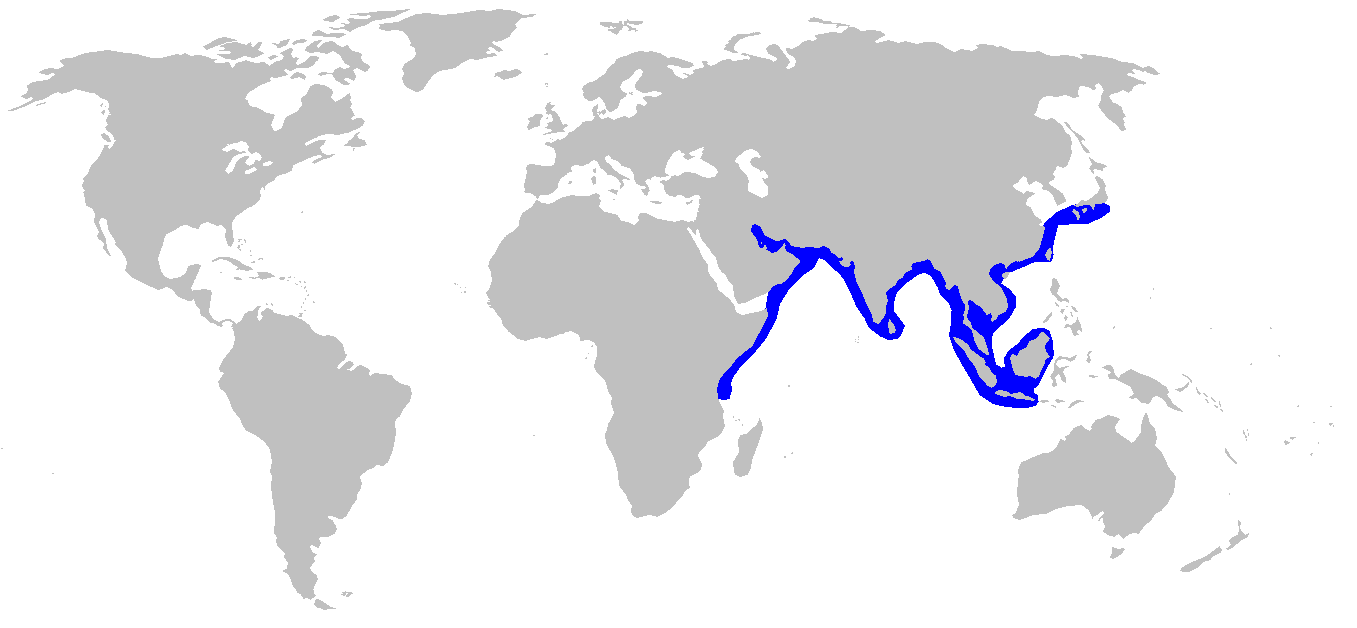
- Range of the spadenose shark

Synonyms
- Carcharias muelleri J. P. Müller & Henle, 1839; Carcharias palasoora Bleeker, 1853; Carcharias sorrahkowah Bleeker, 1853; Carcharias sorrakowah Cuvier, 1817

= Spadenose shark =

Spadenose shark Temporal range: Middle Miocene-recent, ~15–0 Ma

Species of shark

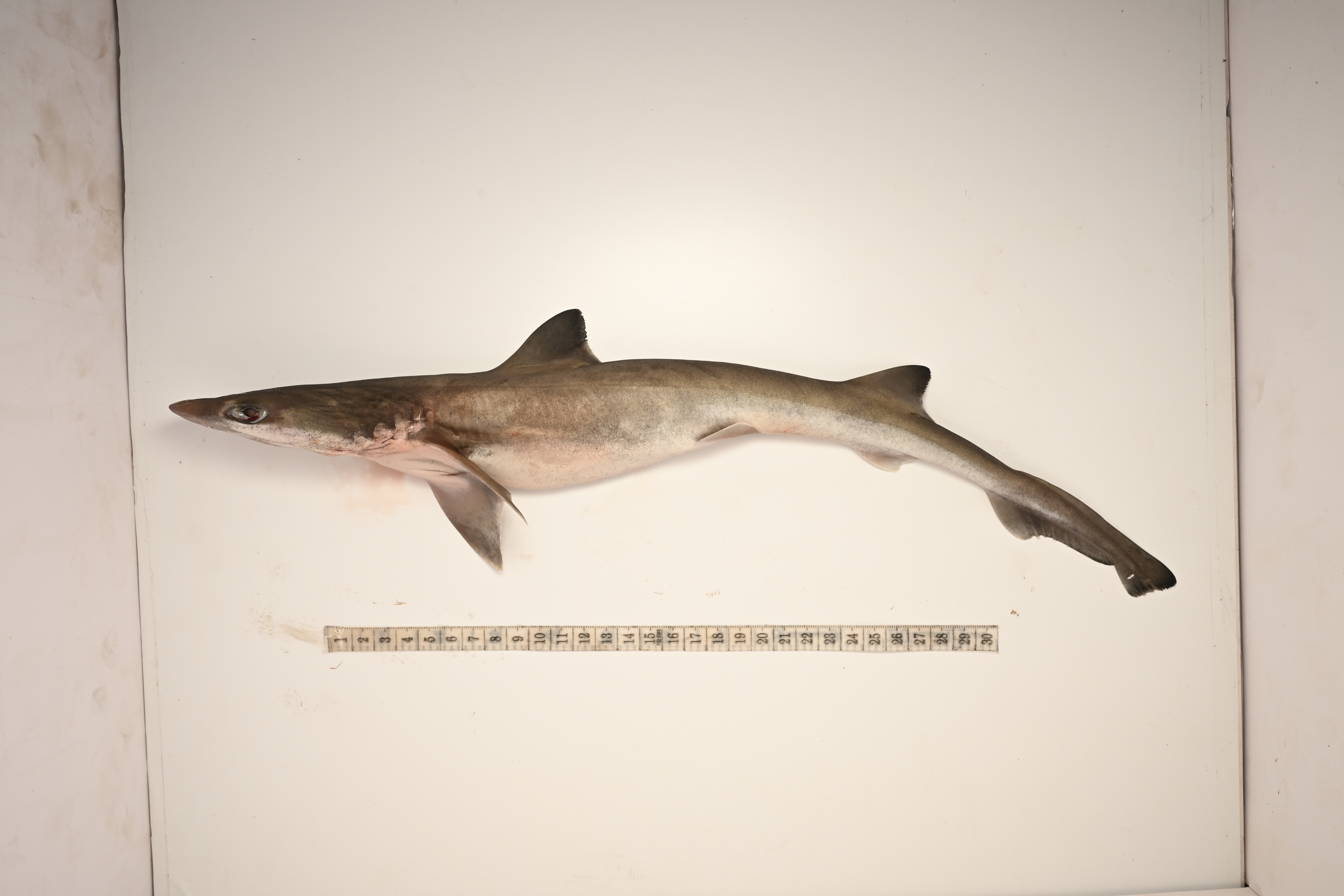
Scoliodon laticaudus

The spadenose shark (Scoliodon laticaudus) is a species of requiem shark in the family Carcharhinidae. It is common in the tropical Indian and western Pacific Oceans, where it forms large schools in shallow water. A small shark reaching a length of 74 cm (29 in), the spadenose shark is named for its distinctively flattened, triangular snout. It is a predator of small bony fishes and invertebrates. This species exhibits the most advanced mode of viviparity of any fish, in which the developed embryos form a highly complex placental connection to the mother at a very small size. Females breed year-round, giving birth to six to 18 pups after a gestation period of 5–6 months. The spadenose shark is harmless to humans and is valued by artisanal and commercial fishers for its meat and fins. Its abundance ensures it forms a significant component of many fisheries in South and Southeast Asia. The International Union for Conservation of Nature has assessed this species as Near threatened. This fish is also known as mori in Goa

== Taxonomy and phylogeny ==
The first scientific description of the spadenose shark was published in 1838 by the German biologists Johannes Peter Müller and Friedrich Gustav Jakob Henle, in their Systematische Beschreibung der Plagiostomen. The holotype is presumed to be a 42 cm (17 in)-long stuffed specimen in the Zoologisches Museum of Berlin. The generic name Scoliodon is derived from the Greek skolex ("worm") and odon ("tooth"), while the specific epithet laticaudus comes from the Latin latus ("broad" or "wide") and cauda ("tail"). Other common names used for this species include Indian dogfish, sharp-nosed shark, trowel-nose shark, and yellow dog shark.

Phylogenetic analyses based on morphological and molecular data indicate the spadenose shark is one of the most basal members of its family, along with the related genus Rhizoprionodon and Galeocerdo, the tiger shark. In addition, anatomical similarities suggest this species to be the closest living relative of the hammerhead sharks, which diverged from the other carcharhinids some time before the Middle Eocene (48.6–37.2 million years ago).

== Description ==
A small, stocky species, the spadenose shark has a broad head with a distinctive, highly flattened, trowel-shaped snout. The eyes and nares are small. The corners of the mouth are well behind the eyes and have poorly developed furrows at the corners. About 25–33 tooth rows are in the upper jaw and 24–34 tooth rows are in the lower jaw; each tooth has a single slender, blade-like, oblique cusp without serrations. The first dorsal fin is positioned closer to the pelvic than the pectoral fins, which are very short and broad. The second dorsal fin is much smaller than the anal fin. No ridge occurs between the dorsal fins. The back is bronze-gray in color, and the belly is white. The fins are plain, but may be darker than the body. The maximum known length is 74 cm (29 in), though unsubstantiated reports indicate individuals reaching 1.2 m (3.9 ft).

== Distribution and habitat ==
The spadenose shark is found in the western Indo-Pacific from Tanzania to South and Southeast Asia, as far east as Java and Borneo and as far north as Taiwan and Japan. It is typically found close to the coast in water 10–13 m (33–43 ft) deep, often close to rocky bottoms. This shark is frequently reported from the lower reaches of rivers in Malaysia, Sumatra, and Borneo, though whether this species is capable of tolerating fresh water like the bull shark (Carcharhinus leucas) is unclear due to a lack of salinity data from these areas.

== Biology and ecology ==
Abundant in many areas, spadenose sharks often form large schools. It feeds mainly on small bony fishes, including anchovies, codlets, burrowing gobies, and Bombay ducks. Shrimp, crabs, cuttlefish, and stomatopods are also sometimes taken. Known parasites of this shark include the tapeworm Ruhnkecestus latipi, and the larvae of ascaridid roundworms.

The spadenose shark has the most advanced form of placental viviparity known in fish, as measured by the complexity of the placental connection and the difference in weight between the egg and the newborn young. Newly ovulated eggs measure only 1 mm (0.039 in) in diameter, while the developing embryos become dependent on their mother for sustenance at a length of only 3 mm (0.12 in). The placental stalk, formed from the yolk sac, has an unusual columnar structure and is covered by numerous long appendiculae that support a massive capillary network, providing a large surface area for gas exchange. The placental tissue contacts the uterine wall in a unique structure called the "trophonematal cup", where nutrients are transferred from the mother's bloodstream into the placenta.

Female spadenose sharks probably mate at least once per year, and breeding takes place year-round. The gestation period of the spadenose shark is 5–6 months long, and the young are born at a length of 12–15 cm (4.7–5.9 in). The litter size is six to 18. Males mature sexually at a length of 24–36 cm (9.4–14.2 in), and females at a length of 33–35 cm (13–14 in). Estimates of the age at maturity range from 6 months to 2 years. The lifespan may be 5 years for males and 6 years for females.

== Human interactions ==
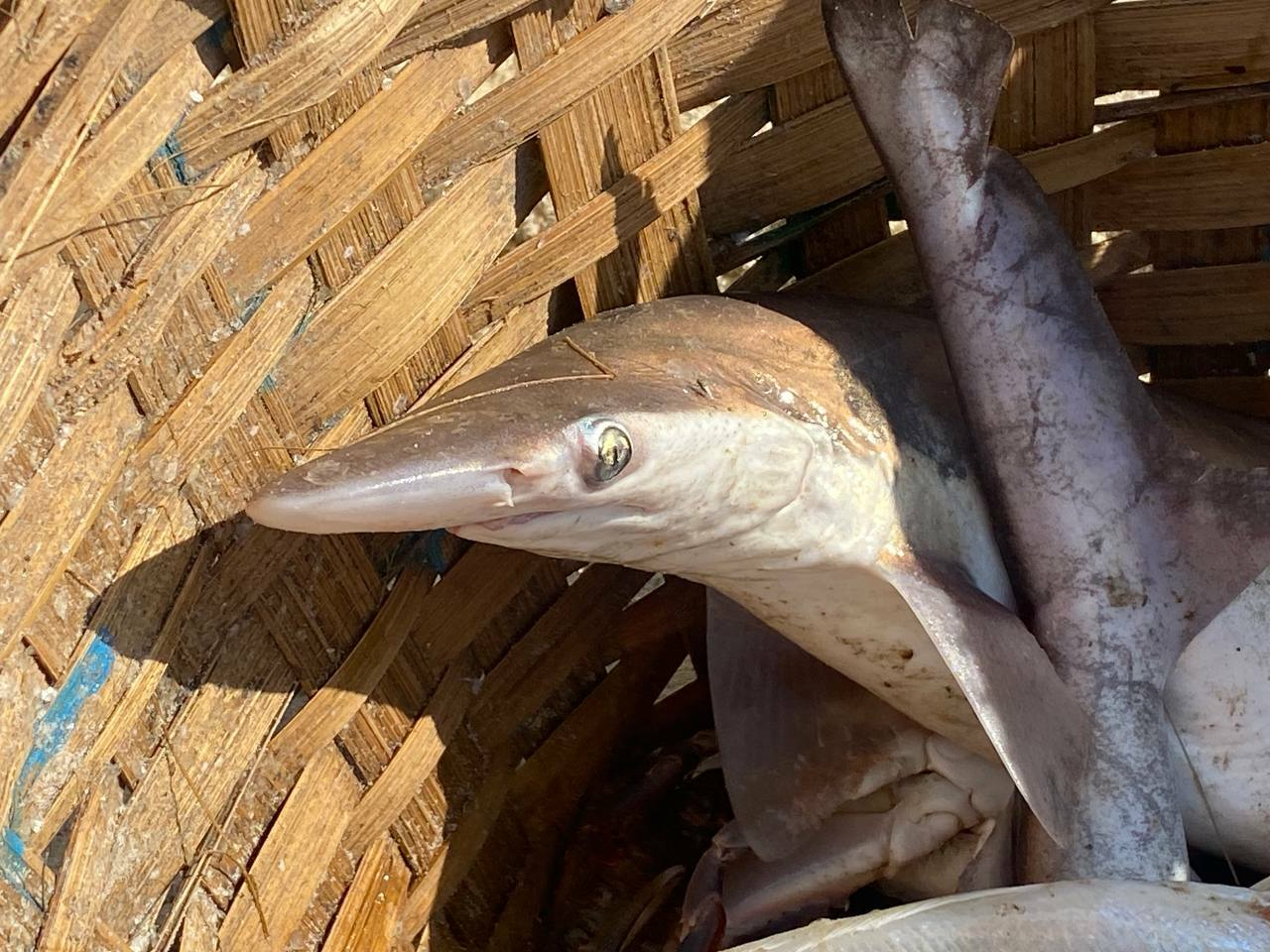
Caught in Goa, India.

The spadenose shark is harmless to humans. This common species is taken by artisanal and commercial fisheries across its range, using floating and fixed gillnets, longlines, bottom nets, fish traps, trawls, and hook-and-line. The meat is eaten or used as bait for other fishes, the fins are valued for shark fin soup, and the carcasses are processed into fishmeal. The meat can also be processed with glacial acetic acid to obtain a gel powder that can be used as a protein supplement in cereal foods, a biodegradable film for wrapping seafood, or a binder in sausages and other foods.

Despite its commercial importance, overall fishery statistics for the spadenose shark are lacking. A 1996 report found it to be the most common coastal shark on Chinese markets. Substantial numbers are caught by Indian and Pakistani fisheries; from 1979 to 1981, an average of 823 tons was caught annually off Verval, India. The spadenose shark is also caught as bycatch, particularly in gillnet fisheries off Kalimantan. The International Union for Conservation of Nature has assessed this species as near threatened; the spadenose shark's relatively short reproductive cycle may render it more resilient to fishing pressure than other sharks, though its low fecundity still merits caution. This shark may also be negatively affected by coastal development, due to its inshore habitat preferences.
