= Saurida umeyoshii =

Scientific classification
- Kingdom: Animalia
- Phylum: Chordata
- Class: Actinopterygii
- Order: Aulopiformes
- Family: Synodontidae
- Genus: Saurida
- Species: S. umeyoshii

Binomial name
- Saurida umeyoshii Inoue & Nakabo, 2006

Species of fish

Saurida umeyoshii is a species of lizardfish that lives in the Pacific Ocean.

== Information ==
S. umeyoshii can be found in a marine environment within a pelagic-neritic range. The depth range of this species ranges to about 100 meters. S. umeyoshii is native to a temperate climate. The maximum recorded length of this species as an unsexed male is about 33.7 centimeters or about 13.26 inches. S. umeyoshii is distributed off the Pacific coast of Asia, off Owase, off Kochi, western Sea of Japan, eastern coast of Kyushu, East China Sea, and Taiwan. It is common to find this species occupying the area of continental shelves deeper than 100 meters.

== Common names ==
The common names of S. umeyoshii in different languages include the following:

- Al-alibot : Ilokano
- Balanghuten : Tagalog
- Balanghuten : Visayan
- Basasong : Pangasinan
- Bekut laut : Malay
- Bubule : Tagalog
- Butong-panday : Bikol
- Cá Mối thường : Vietnamese
- Chonor : Malay
- Daldalag : Ilokano
- Hai la : Malay
- Kalaso : Tagalog
- Karaho : Cebuano
- Karaho : Hiligaynon
- Kortfinnet øglefisk : Danish (dansk)
- Kuti-kuti : Agutaynen
- Mengkarong : Malay (bahasa Melayu)
- Mengkerong : Malay (bahasa Melayu)
- Short-finned lizardfish : English
- Short-finned saury : English
- Shortfin saury : English
- Talad : Waray-waray
- Talho : Waray-waray
- Tamangkah : Chavacano
- Tigbasbay : Maranao/Samal/Tao Sug
- Tigbasbay : Tagalog
- Tiki : Bikol
- Tiki : Davawenyo
- Tiki : Wolof (Wollof)
- Tiki-tiki : Cebuano
- Tiki-tiki : Kuyunon
- Tiki-tiki : Tagalog
- Tiki-tiki : Visayan
- Tuko : Tagalog
- Ubi : Malay (bahasa Melayu)
- 短臂蛇鲻 : Mandarin Chinese

== Notes ==
- Froese, Rainer; Pauly, Daniel (eds.). "Saurida umeyoshii". FishBase. April 2012 version.
