= Longfin lizardfish =

Shortjaw lizardfish

Scientific classification
- Kingdom: Animalia
- Phylum: Chordata
- Class: Actinopterygii
- Order: Aulopiformes
- Family: Synodontidae
- Genus: Saurida
- Species: S. longimanus

Binomial name
- Saurida longimanus Norman, 1939

Species of fish

The longfin lizardfish (Saurida longimanus), also known as the longfin saury, is a species of lizardfish that lives in the Indo-Pacific.

== Size ==
The average length of a longfin lizardfish unsexed male is about 25 centimeters.

== Habitat ==
The habitat of the longfin lizardfish is in tropical marine environments at a demersal depth range.

== Distribution ==
The longfin lizardfish can be found in:

- Indo-West Pacific
- Gulf of Oman
- Southern Indonesia
- Arafura Sea
- Northern and Northwestern Australia

== Notes ==
- Froese, Rainer; Pauly, Daniel (eds.). "Saurida longimanus". FishBase. April 2012 version.
