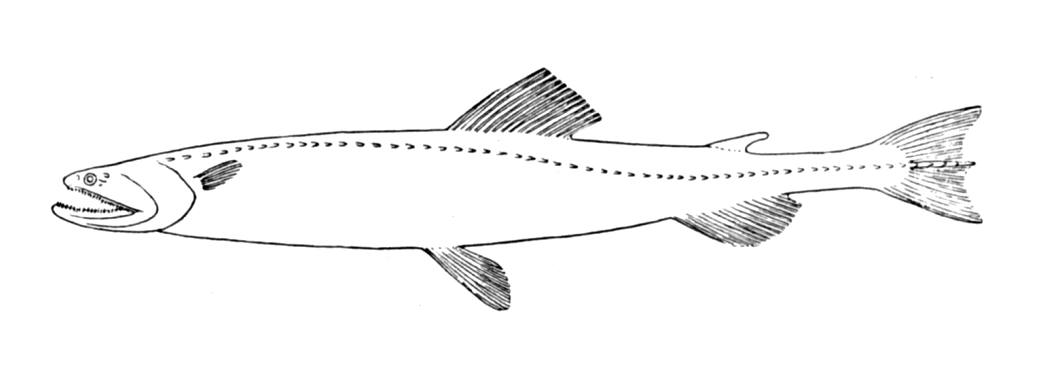
- Harpadon microchir

Scientific classification
- Kingdom: Animalia
- Phylum: Chordata
- Class: Actinopterygii
- Order: Aulopiformes
- Family: Harpadontidae
- Genus: Harpadon
- Species: H. microchir

Binomial name
- Harpadon microchir Günther, 1878

= Harpadon microchir =

Species of fish

Harpadon microchir is a species of lizardfish that lives mainly in the Indo-Pacific.
