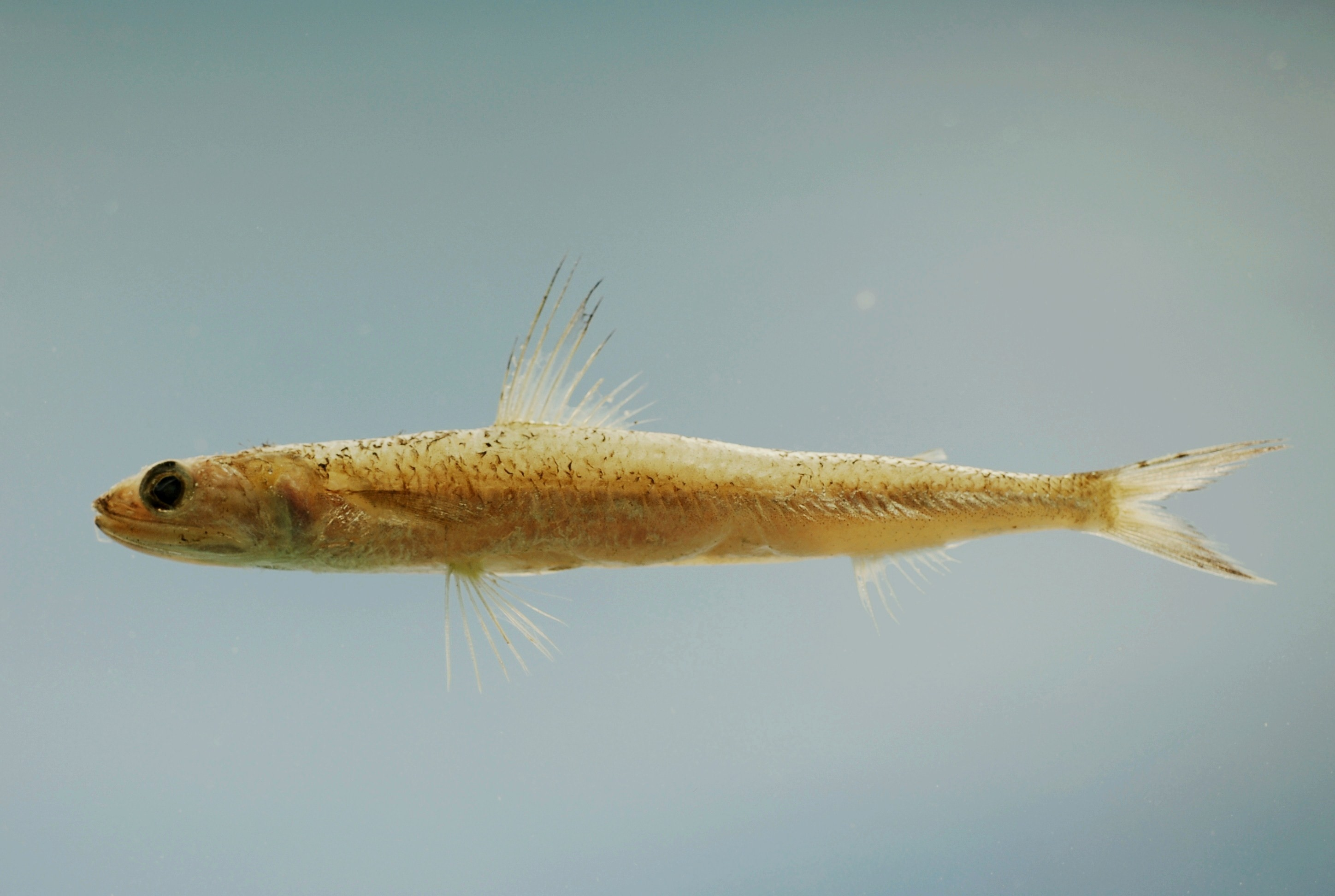

Scientific classification
- Domain: Eukaryota
- Kingdom: Animalia
- Phylum: Chordata
- Class: Actinopterygii
- Order: Aulopiformes
- Family: Synodontidae
- Genus: Saurida
- Species: S. normani

Binomial name
- Saurida normani Longley, 1935

= Shortjaw lizardfish =

Species of fish

The shortjaw lizardfish (Saurida normani) is a species of lizardfish that lives mainly in tropical waters.

The shortjaw lizardfish is found on reefs around 25 – 550 meters deep.

The maximum recorded length of the shortjaw lizardfish is about 45 centimeters (17.7 inches), and the common length is about 30 centimeters (11.8 inches). The maximum recorded weight is about 500 grams (1.1 pounds).

This species is native to the western Atlantic Ocean from South Carolina in the United States to the northern and eastern Gulf of Mexico and the western Caribbean. The fish lives on sandy and muddy bottoms.

== Common names ==
Other common names for the shortjaw lizardfish include anoli (French), chile espinoso, guaripete, lagarto dientón, lagarto espinoso (Spanish), kitsune-aka-eso (Japanese), and kortkæbet øglefisk (Danish).
