= Saurida pseudotumbil =

Scientific classification
- Domain: Eukaryota
- Kingdom: Animalia
- Phylum: Chordata
- Class: Actinopterygii
- Order: Aulopiformes
- Family: Synodontidae
- Genus: Saurida
- Species: S. pseudotumbil

Binomial name
- Saurida pseudotumbil Dutt & Sagar, 1981

Species of fish

Saurida pseudotumbil is a species of lizardfish that lives primarily off the coast of India.

== Environment ==
S. pseudotumbil is recorded to be found in a marine environment within a demersal depth range. This species is native to a tropical climate.

== Distribution ==
S. pseudotumbil can be found in the Indian Ocean. They can be found off the coast of India.

== Notes ==
- Froese, Rainer; Pauly, Daniel (eds.). "Saurida pseudotumbil". FishBase. April 2012 version.
