= Shortfin lizardfish =

Scientific classification
- Domain: Eukaryota
- Kingdom: Animalia
- Phylum: Chordata
- Class: Actinopterygii
- Order: Aulopiformes
- Family: Synodontidae
- Genus: Saurida
- Species: S. micropectoralis

Binomial name
- Saurida micropectoralis Shindo & Yamada, 1972

Species of fish

The shortfin lizardfish (Saurida micropectoralis) is a species of lizardfish that lives mainly off the coast of Japan.

== Information ==
S. micropectoralis is known to be found in a marine environment within a demersal depth range of 20 – 260 meters. This species is native to a tropical climate. The maximum length of S. micropectoralis as an unsexed male is about 38 cm (15 in). This species is identified by its elongated, brown body with a white underside. It has dark colored fins. S. micropectoralis commonly occupy the areas of Indo-West Pacific, Andaman, South China seas, south to the Arafura Sea, and northern Australia. It is common to find this species in the area of muddy bottoms of the continental shelf down to about 60 m (200 ft). The diet of this species includes small bottom-dwelling invertebrates and fishes.

== Common names ==
The common names of S. micropectoralis in different languages are as follows:

- Korean : Chan-bi-nul-mae-t'ung-i
- Japanese : Koukai-tokage-eso
- English : Shortfin lizardfish
- Mandarin : Xiao lín shé zi
- Korean : 잔비늘매퉁이

== Notes ==
- Froese, Rainer; Pauly, Daniel (eds.). "Saurida micropectoralis". FishBase. April 2012 version.
