= Scoliodon conecuhensis =

Scoliodon conecuhensis Temporal range: Lutetian

Scientific classification
- Domain: Eukaryota
- Kingdom: Animalia
- Phylum: Chordata
- Class: Chondrichthyes
- Subclass: Elasmobranchii
- Division: Selachii
- Order: Carcharhiniformes
- Family: Carcharhinidae
- Genus: Scoliodon
- Species: †S. conecuhensis

Binomial name
- †Scoliodon conecuhensis Cappetta & Case, 2016

Extinct species of shark

Scoliodon conecuhensis is an extinct species of Scoliodon that lived during the Lutetian stage of the Eocene epoch.

== Distribution ==
Scoliodon conecuhensis is known from Alabama.
