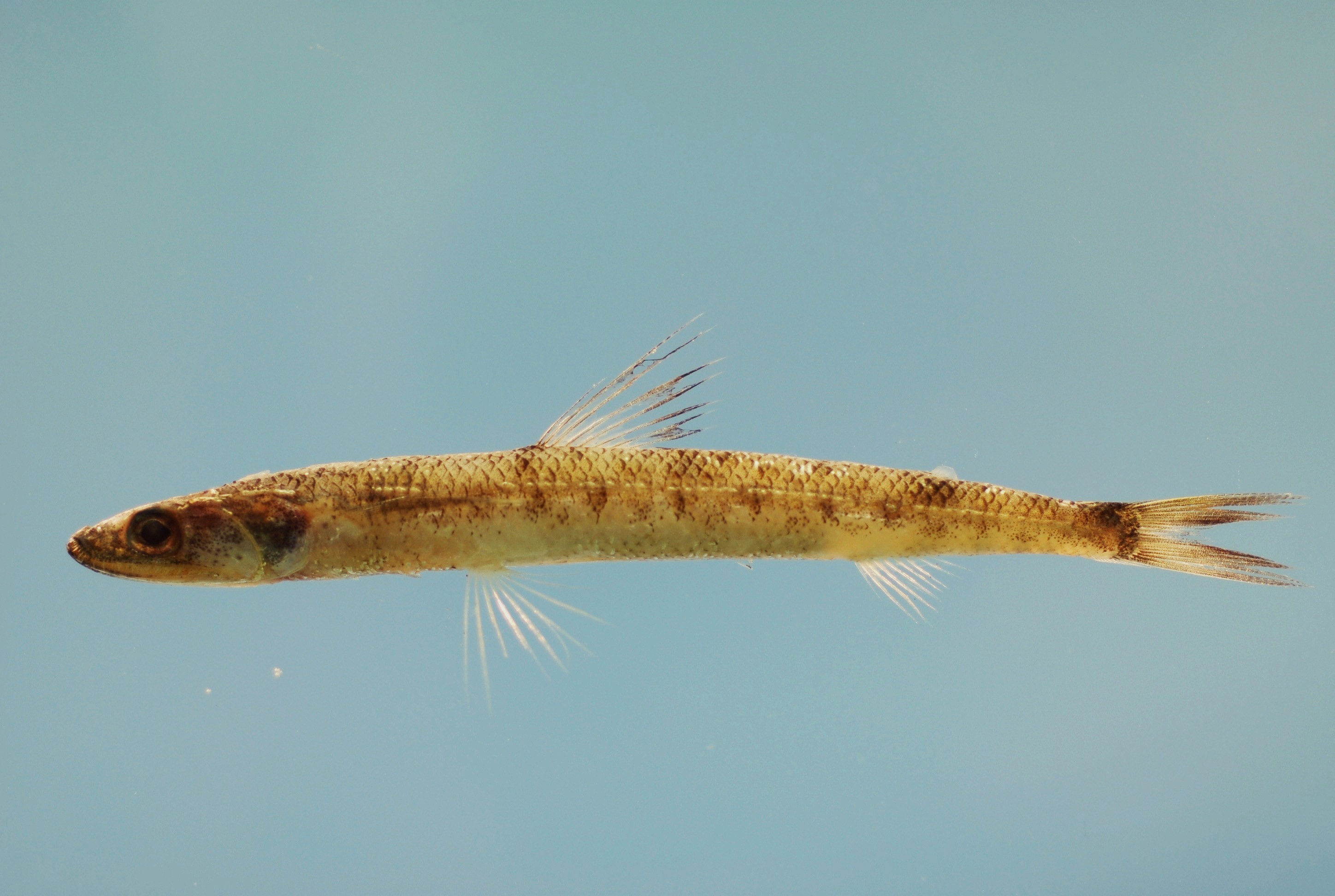

Scientific classification
- Kingdom: Animalia
- Phylum: Chordata
- Class: Actinopterygii
- Order: Aulopiformes
- Family: Synodontidae
- Genus: Saurida
- Species: S. caribbaea

Binomial name
- Saurida caribbaea Breder, 1927

= Smallscale lizardfish =

Species of fish

The smallscale lizardfish (Saurida caribbaea) is a species of lizardfish that lives mainly in the Western Atlantic.

== Information ==
The Smallscale lizardfish is known to live in a marine environment within a demersal range of about 6 – 460 meters. This species is most commonly found within the range of about 20 – 215 meters. The Smallscale lizardfish is native to a tropical climate. The average length of the Smallscale lizardfish as an unsexed male is about 18 centimeters or about 7.08 inches. This species is recorded to be found in the areas of Western Atlantic, northeastern Florida, USA, northern Gulf of Mexico, Guianas, western Bahamas, Cuba, and Uruguay.

== Common names ==
The common names of the Saurida caribbaea are as follows:

- Spanish : chile caribeño
- Spanish : chile espinoso
- Japanese : Karibu-eso
- Spanish : Lagarto caribeño
- English : Lizardfish
- Spanish : Pez lagarto
- English : shortjaw lizardfish
- English : Smallescale Lizardfish
- English : Smallscale lizardfish
- Danish : Småskællet øglefisk
- Chinese : 加勒比蛇鯔
- Mandarin Chinese : 加勒比蛇鲻

=== Description ===
Body slender, elongate, cylindrical; head pointed, eye large; snout about as long as eye; mouth large, slightly oblique, at front, lower jaw longer than upper jaw, visible from above when mouth is closed;many rows fine pointed teeth on jaws, tongue and (in 2 bands) on side of roof of mouth; fins without spines; one dorsal fin in mid-body, with a small skin-flap fin behind it above anal fin; pelvics on abdomen behind pectoral base, with 9 rays, inner rays about same length as outer rays; pectoral fin17.5-20% of SL, reaches well past origin of pelvics; scales smooth; lateral line straight, along entire body; tail fin with scales on bases of main rays but not on short rays on top and bottom of fin base; 51-60 lateral line scales; 4 rows of scales between lateral line and dorsal fin; 18-21 scales before dorsal fin.

Light brown above, yellowish below; back with dark blotches (not in form of saddles), irregular brown spots along and above lateral line; dorsal fin dusky with dark margin=

=== References ===
==== Population ====
This species is common and locally abundant; there are 118 nominal records in Fishnet2, with up to 42 individuals in a single lot. It is a common lizardfish in Brazilian waters (Carvalho-Filho et al. 2010).

===== Range Description =====
This species is distributed in the western Atlantic from North Carolina south along the U.S., the northern Bahamas and north-central Cuba, throughout the Gulf of Mexico except Cuba, in the Caribbean from Jamaica, Puerto Rico to Saba Atoll, and along the Central and South American coast from Mexico to Rio de Janeiro, Brazil (Anderson et al. 1966, Claro et al. 2001, Carvalho-Filho et al. 2010, R. Robertson pers. comm. 2014). The depth range is 10–460 m.

===== Habitat and Ecology =====
This demersal species occurs in offshore areas over soft bottom on the continental shelf and slope; occasionally in shallow inshore waters. Its maximum size is 15 cm TL, but common to 10 cm (McEachran and Fechhelm 1998).

===== Diet =====
Saurida caribbaea mainly feeds on bony fish and mobile benthic crustaceans (shrimps/crabs)

===== Notes =====
- Froese, Rainer; Pauly, Daniel (eds.). "Saurida caribbaea". FishBase. April 2012 version.
