= Brazilian lizardfish =

Scientific classification
- Kingdom: Animalia
- Phylum: Chordata
- Class: Actinopterygii
- Order: Aulopiformes
- Family: Synodontidae
- Genus: Saurida
- Species: S. brasiliensis

Binomial name
- Saurida brasiliensis Norman, 1935

Species of fish

The Brazilian lizardfish (Saurida brasiliensis) is a species of lizardfish that lives mainly in the Eastern Atlantic.

== Information ==
The Brazilian lizardfish is known to be found in a marine environment within demersal range. The depth range that it can be found is within 50–194 meters. This species is native to a subtropical climate. The maximum recorded length of the Brazilian lizardfish as an unsexed male is about 25 centimeters or about 9.84 inches. The most common recorded length average of this species ranges from about 15 centimeters to about 5.9 centimeters as an unsexed male. The distribution and occupation of the Brazilian lizardfish is found in the areas of Eastern Atlantic, Mauritania, Senegal, Gabon, Angola, Ascension Island, Western Atlantic, North Carolina, the United States, Santa Catarina, Brazil, the Gulf of Mexico, and the Caribbean. This species is found on the outer areas of the continental shelf.

== Common names ==
The common names of the Brazilian lizardfish in different languages is as follows:

- Danish: Brasiliansk øglefisk i
- English: Brazilian lizardfish
- English: Largescale lizardfish
- French: chile brasileño
- French: Anoli brésilien
- Portuguese: Lagarto-brasileiro
- Portuguese: Peixe-lagarto
- Spanish: chile brasileño
- Spanish: Guaripete
- Spanish: lagarto
- Spanish: Lagarto brasileño
- Spanish: Lagarto brasilero
- Spanish: Pez lagarto
- Mandarin Chinese: 巴西蛇鯔
- Mandarin Chinese: 巴西蛇鲻
- Mandarin Chinese: 帕氏蛇鯔
- Mandarin Chinese: 帕氏蛇鲻

== Notes ==
- Froese, Rainer; Pauly, Daniel (eds.). "Saurida brasiliensis". FishBase. April 2012 version.
