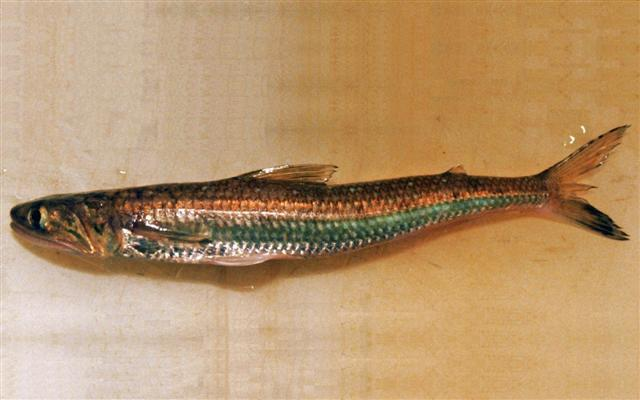
- Saurida undosquamis

Scientific classification
- Kingdom: Animalia
- Phylum: Chordata
- Class: Actinopterygii
- Division: Teleostei
- Order: Aulopiformes
- Family: Harpadontidae
- Genus: Saurida; Valenciennes, 1850

= Saurida =

Genus of fishes

Saurida is a genus of fish in the family Harpadontidae.

== Species ==
There are currently 25 recognized species in this genus:

- Saurida argentea W. J. Macleay, 1881 (Short-fin saury)
- Saurida brasiliensis Norman, 1935 (Brazilian lizardfish)
- Saurida caribbaea Breder, 1927 (Small-scale lizardfish)
- Saurida elongata (Temminck & Schlegel, 1846) (Slender lizardfish)
- Saurida eso Jordan & Herre, 1907
- Saurida filamentosa J. D. Ogilby, 1910 (Thread-fin lizardfish)
- Saurida flamma Waples, 1982 (Orange-mouth lizardfish)
- Saurida fortis Furuhashi, Russell & Motomura, 2022
- Saurida golanii B. C. Russell, 2011 (Golani's lizardfish)
- Saurida gracilis (Quoy & Gaimard, 1824) (Gracile lizardfish)
- Saurida grandisquamis Günther, 1864
- Saurida isarankurai Shindo & Yamada, 1972 (Short-jaw saury)
- Saurida lessepsianus B. C. Russell, Golani & Tikochinski, 2015 (Lessepsian lizardfish)
- Saurida longimanus Norman, 1939 (Long-fin lizardfish)
- Saurida macrolepis S. Tanaka (I), 1917
- Saurida micropectoralis Shindo & Yamada, 1972 (Short-fin lizardfish)
- Saurida nebulosa Valenciennes, 1850 (Clouded lizardfish)
- Saurida normani Longley, 1935 (Short-jaw lizardfish)
- Saurida parri Norman, 1935
- Saurida pseudotumbil Dutt & Sagar, 1981 (Species inquirenda)
- Saurida suspicio Breder, 1927 (Suspicious lizardfish)
- Saurida tumbil (Bloch, 1795) (Greater lizardfish)
- Saurida tweddlei B. C. Russell, 2015
- Saurida umeyoshii Inoue & Nakabo, 2006
- Saurida undosquamis (J. Richardson, 1848) (Brush-tooth lizardfish)
- Saurida weijeni Russell, Malay & Cabebe-Barnuevo, 2024

Synonyms

- Saurida microlepis H. W. Wu & Ki. Fu. Wang, 1931; valid as S. eso
- Saurida wanieso Shindo & Yamada, 1972; valid as S. elongatus (Wanieso lizardfish)
