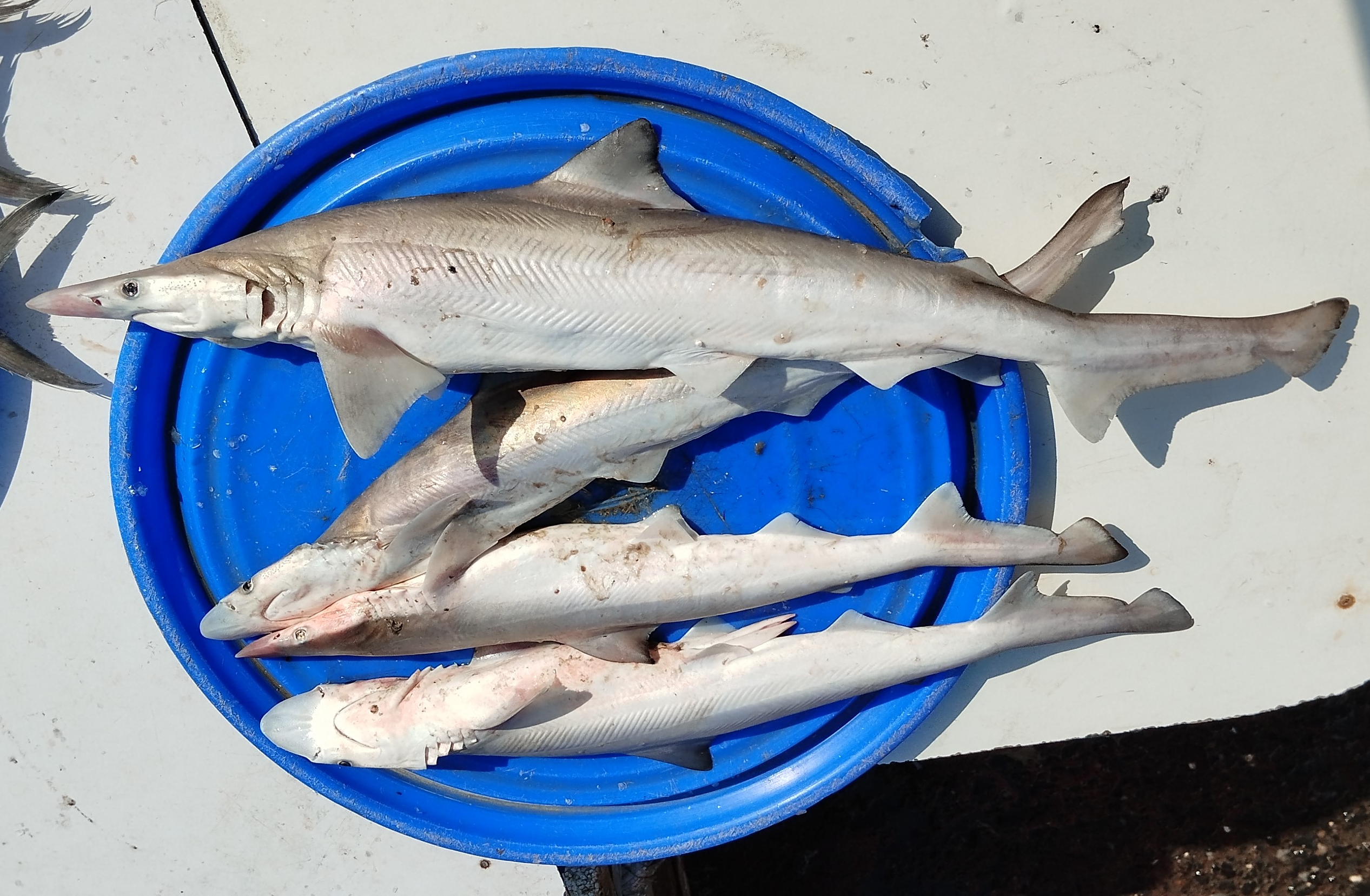
- Scoliodon laticaudus

Scientific classification
- Kingdom: Animalia
- Phylum: Chordata
- Class: Chondrichthyes
- Subclass: Elasmobranchii
- Division: Selachii
- Order: Carcharhiniformes
- Family: Carcharhinidae
- Genus: Scoliodon; J. P. Müller & Henle, 1838

Type species
- Scoliodon laticaudus J. P. Müller & Henle, 1838

Synonyms
- Physodon Valenciennes in J. P. Müller & Henle, 1838

= Scoliodon =

Scoliodon Temporal range: Eocene-recent

Genus of sharks

Scoliodon is a genus of requiem sharks in the family Carcharhinidae. It was formerly thought to include only a single Indo-Pacific species, the spadenose shark (S. laticaudus), but recent taxonomic research has found an additional species, the Pacific spadenose shark (S. macrorhynchos).

== Location ==
The Scoliodon(dog fish )genus of sharks has been seen in the bay of Bengal and found mainly in the Indo-West Pacific oceans from the west coasts of Africa to south of Japan.

== Biology ==
Scoliodon has an elongated, spindle-shaped body tapered at the ends, making it a very fast swimmer. The trunk and tail are laterally compressed, while the head region is dorsoventrally compressed. The entire body is covered by an exoskeleton of placoid scales. The mouth is located on the ventral side and is bound on both sides by jaws. It has two rows of homodont or polyphyodont teeth, which are homologous to the placoid scales covering the body. Male Scoliodon species mature at a length of 33 cm while female Scoliodon species mature at 36 cm. When reproducing, the female is mostly ovoviviparous, Scolion laticuadus has a minimum of 8 to a maximum of 19 embryos when conceiving. At birth, the Scolion laticaudus is roughly 13.7 cm in length. Because of limited fecundity, the Scoliodon genus of sharks can be negatively affected by targeted fishing and habitat degradation.

== Species ==
=== Extant species ===
There are two living species.

- Scoliodon laticaudus J. P. Müller & Henle, 1838 (spadenose shark)
- Scoliodon macrorhynchos Bleeker, 1852 (Pacific spadenose shark)

=== Extinct species ===
The genus include three extinct species:

- †Scoliodon taxandriae Leriche, 1926
- †Scoliodon conecuhensis Cappeta & Case, 2016
- †Scoliodon terraenovae Richardson, 1836
