= Saurida suspicio =

Scientific classification
- Kingdom: Animalia
- Phylum: Chordata
- Class: Actinopterygii
- Order: Aulopiformes
- Family: Synodontidae
- Genus: Saurida
- Species: S. suspicio

Binomial name
- Saurida suspicio Breder, 1927

Species of fish

Saurida suspicio, the suspicious lizardfish, is a species of lizardfish that lives mainly in the Caribbean.

== Information ==
Saurida suspicio is known to be found in a marine environment within a demersal range. This species is native to a tropical climate. The average length of the Suspicious lizardfish as an unsexed male is about nine centimeters or about 3.5 inches. They are recorded to occupy the areas of Western Atlantic, the Bahamas, Leeward Islands, the western Caribbean, and the Antilles. This species lives in coral reefs and sandy bottoms. This species of fish cannot be kept in an aquarium and is not used for commerce. It does not pose as a threat to humans.

== Notes ==
- Froese, Rainer; Pauly, Daniel (eds.). "Saurida suspicio". FishBase. April 2012 version.
