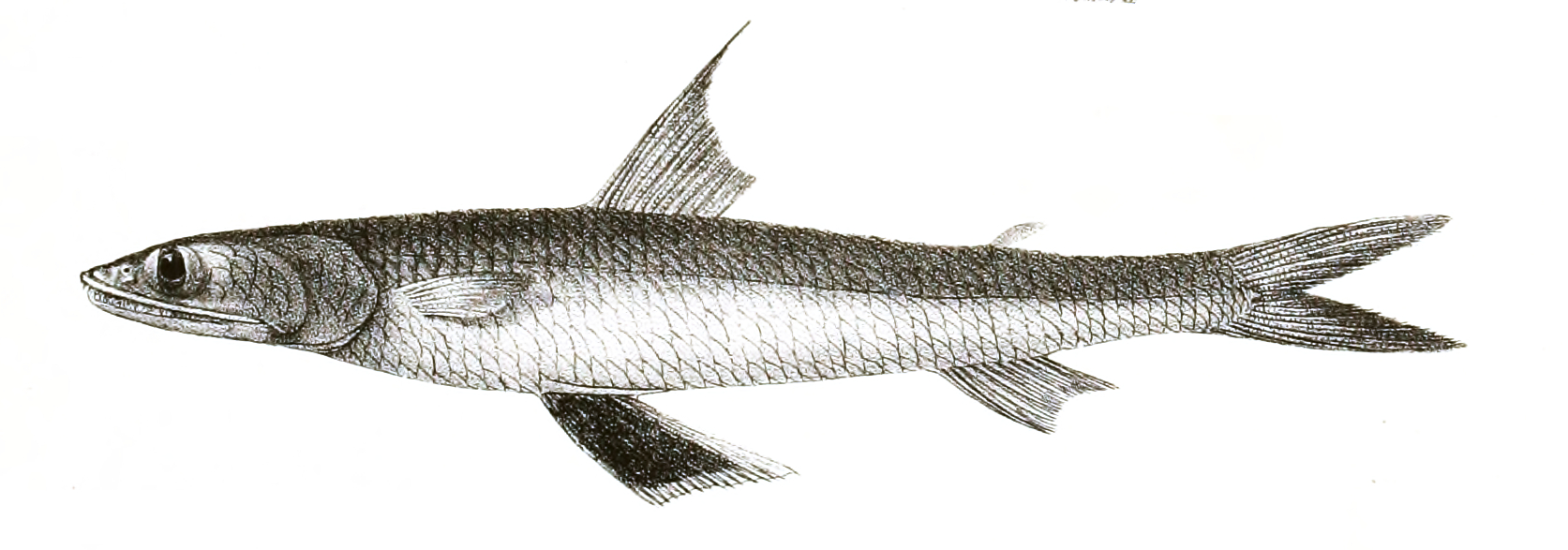

Scientific classification
- Domain: Eukaryota
- Kingdom: Animalia
- Phylum: Chordata
- Class: Actinopterygii
- Order: Aulopiformes
- Family: Synodontidae
- Genus: Saurida
- Species: S. tumbil

Binomial name
- Saurida tumbil (Bloch, 1795)

Synonyms
- Salmo tumbil Bloch, 1795

= Greater lizardfish =

Species of fish

The greater lizardfish (Saurida tumbil) is a species of lizardfish that lives in the Indo-Pacific. They are a minor fishery.

== Distribution ==
They live in the Indo-West Pacific. More specifically, their geographic range spans from Red Sea and east coast of Africa (except Kenya), including Madagascar to the Persian Gulf, Arabian Sea, and further east to southeast Asia and Australia but they do not appear to occur in the central or eastern Pacific.

== Short description ==
Its average length at maturation is 30 cm (12 in) (range 19–35 cm) and maximum length is 60 cm (24 in) fork length. They have neither dorsal spines nor anal spines but display 11–13 dorsal soft rays (total) and 10–11 anal soft rays. Body is cigar-shaped, rounded or slightly compressed. The head is pointed and depressed. The snout is broader than long. Color is generally brown above and silver below. The back has faint cross bands. The tips of the dorsal and pectorals and the lower caudal lobe are blackish.

== Biology ==
This species is found on muddy bottoms and trawling grounds. It feeds on fishes, crustaceans, and cephalopods.
