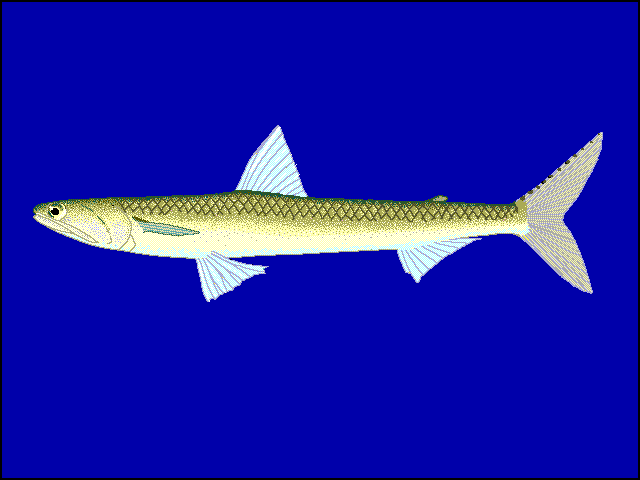

Scientific classification
- Kingdom: Animalia
- Phylum: Chordata
- Class: Actinopterygii
- Order: Aulopiformes
- Family: Synodontidae
- Genus: Saurida
- Species: S. undosquamis

Binomial name
- Saurida undosquamis (J. Richardson, 1848)

Synonyms
- Saurida grandisquamis Günther, 1864

= Saurida undosquamis =

Species of fish

Saurida undosquamis, the brushtooth lizardfish, large-scale grinner or largescale saury, is a type of lizardfish, a demersal species that occurs in the Eastern Indian Ocean, Malay Peninsula, northern Java, Arafura Sea, Louisiade Archipelago, southern Philippines and northern Australia. Reports of its occurrence in the Red Sea region and introduction to the Mediterranean are questionable.

== Fishing ==
Brushtooth lizard fish is considered to be one of the most important demersal target species of the commercial fishery in Egypt. It represented about 70% (912 and 575 tonnes) of the total landings of the Lizard fish (including Synodus saurus) during 2012 and 2013 respectively.

Bottom trawling nets mainly designed to catch shrimp is also used to catch lizard fish.
