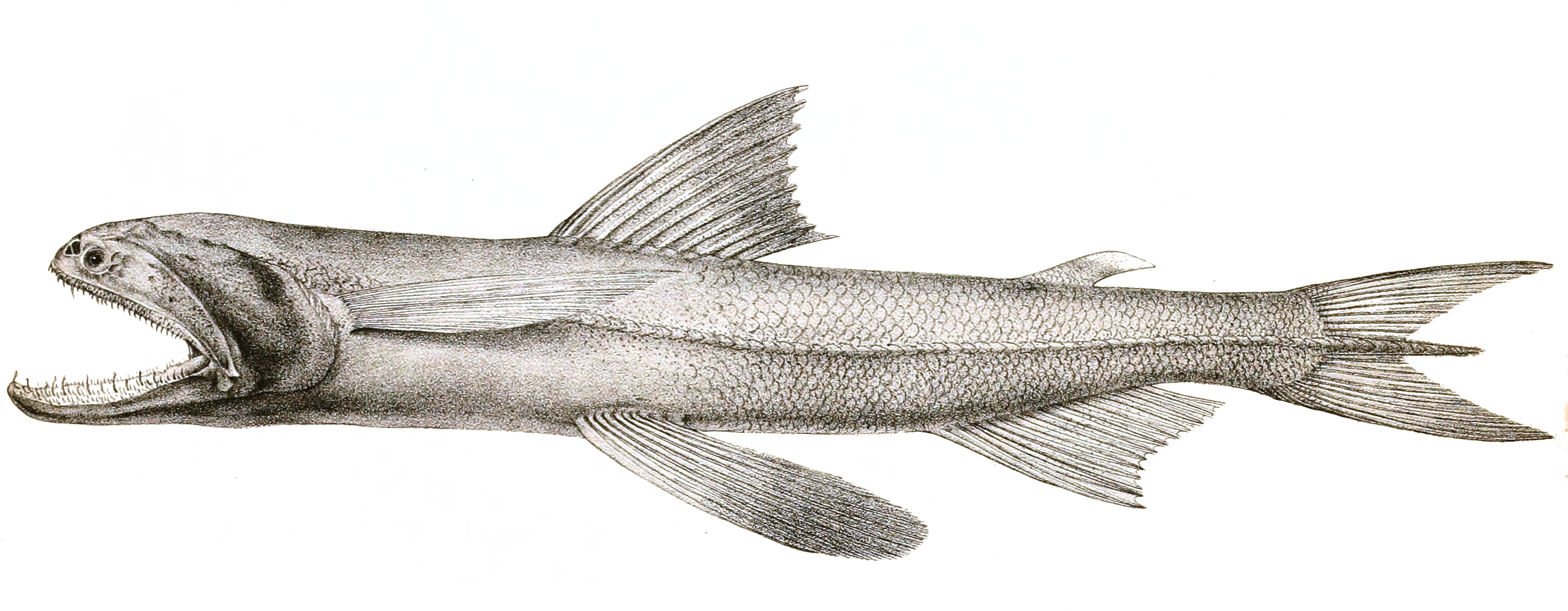

Conservation status
- Near Threatened (IUCN 3.1)

Scientific classification
- Kingdom: Animalia
- Phylum: Chordata
- Class: Actinopterygii
- Order: Aulopiformes
- Family: Synodontidae
- Genus: Harpadon
- Species: H. nehereus

Binomial name
- Harpadon nehereus (F. Hamilton, 1822)

= Bombay duck =

Species of fish

Harpadon nehereus, commonly known as the Bombay duck or bummalo, is a species of lizardfish. Adults may reach a maximum length of 40 cm (16 in), but the usual size is around 25 cm (10 in).

== Etymology ==
The small bomelon fish caught in Bombay (now Mumbai) was traditionally coated in asafoetida and dried in the sun, becoming pungent with a strong salty taste. Fried and crumbled, the fish preparation called Bombay duck became a popular condiment in Anglo-Indian cookery.

An 1829 book of poems and "Indian reminiscences" published under the pseudonym "Sir Toby Rendrag" notes the "use of a fish nick-named 'Bombay Duck'" and the phrase is used in texts as early as 1815.

== Distribution and fisheries ==
Global capture production of Bombay-duck (Harpadon nehereus) in thousand tonnes from 1950 to 2022, as reported by the FAO

The Bombay duck lives in the tropical areas of the Indo-Pacific, with a discontinuous distribution along the Indian coast. It has traditionally been caught in the waters off Maharashtra, Gujarat in the Lakshadweep Sea, where it is an important item of the yearly catch. It is fished in the Bay of Bengal and the South China Sea in smaller numbers.

== International availability ==
Following the discovery of a batch of imported seafood contaminated by Salmonella in 1996, the European Commission prohibited fish imports from India other than from approved freezing and canning factories. As Bombay duck is not produced in a factory, this meant it too was banned. After a campaign to "Save Bombay Duck", the Indian High Commission approached the European Commission, which adjusted its regulations so that the fish can still be dried in the open air, but has to be packed in an "EC approved" packing station. A Birmingham wholesale merchant located a packing source in Mumbai, and the product became available again.

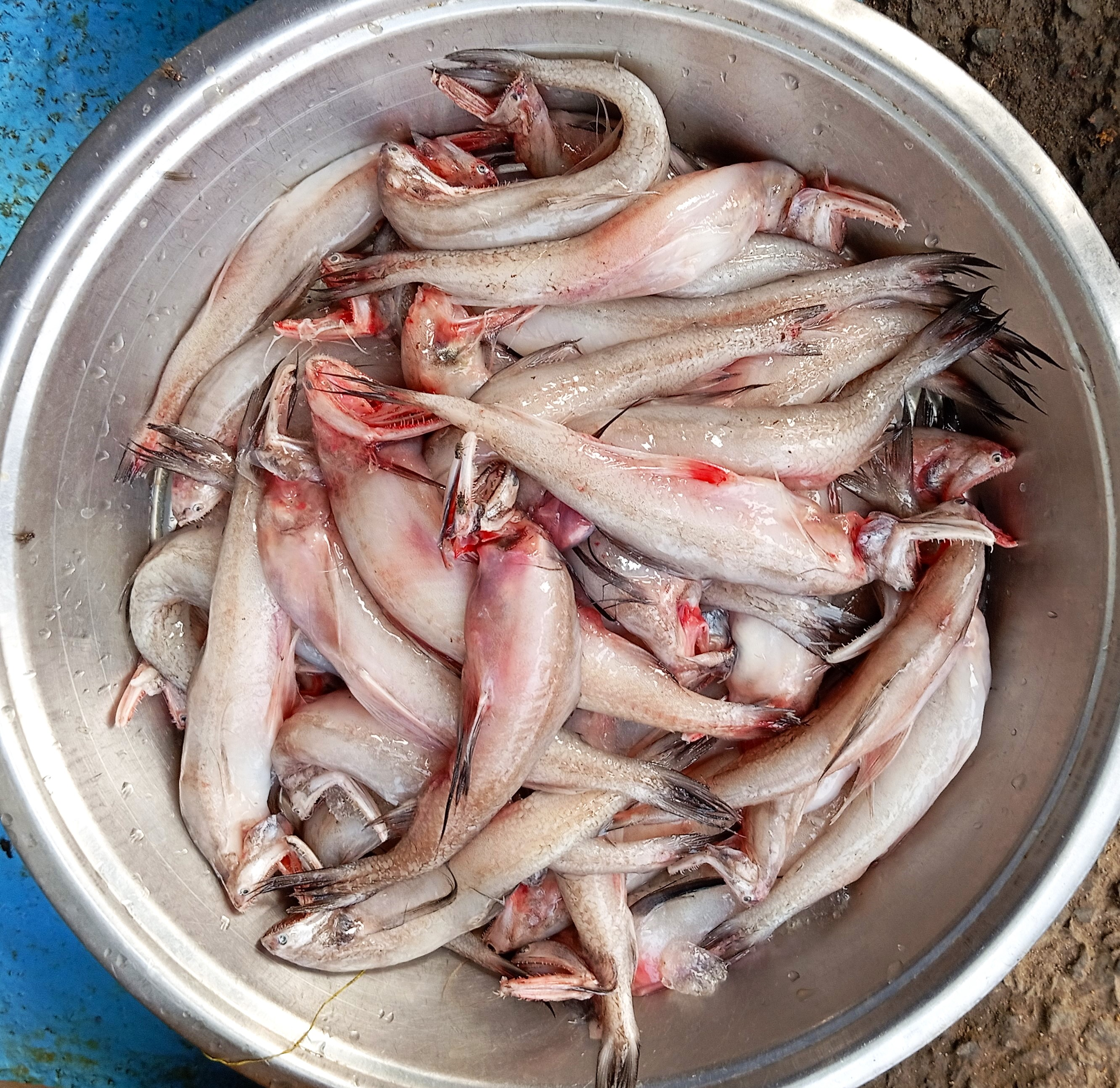
Fresh Bombay duck for sale in Kolkata

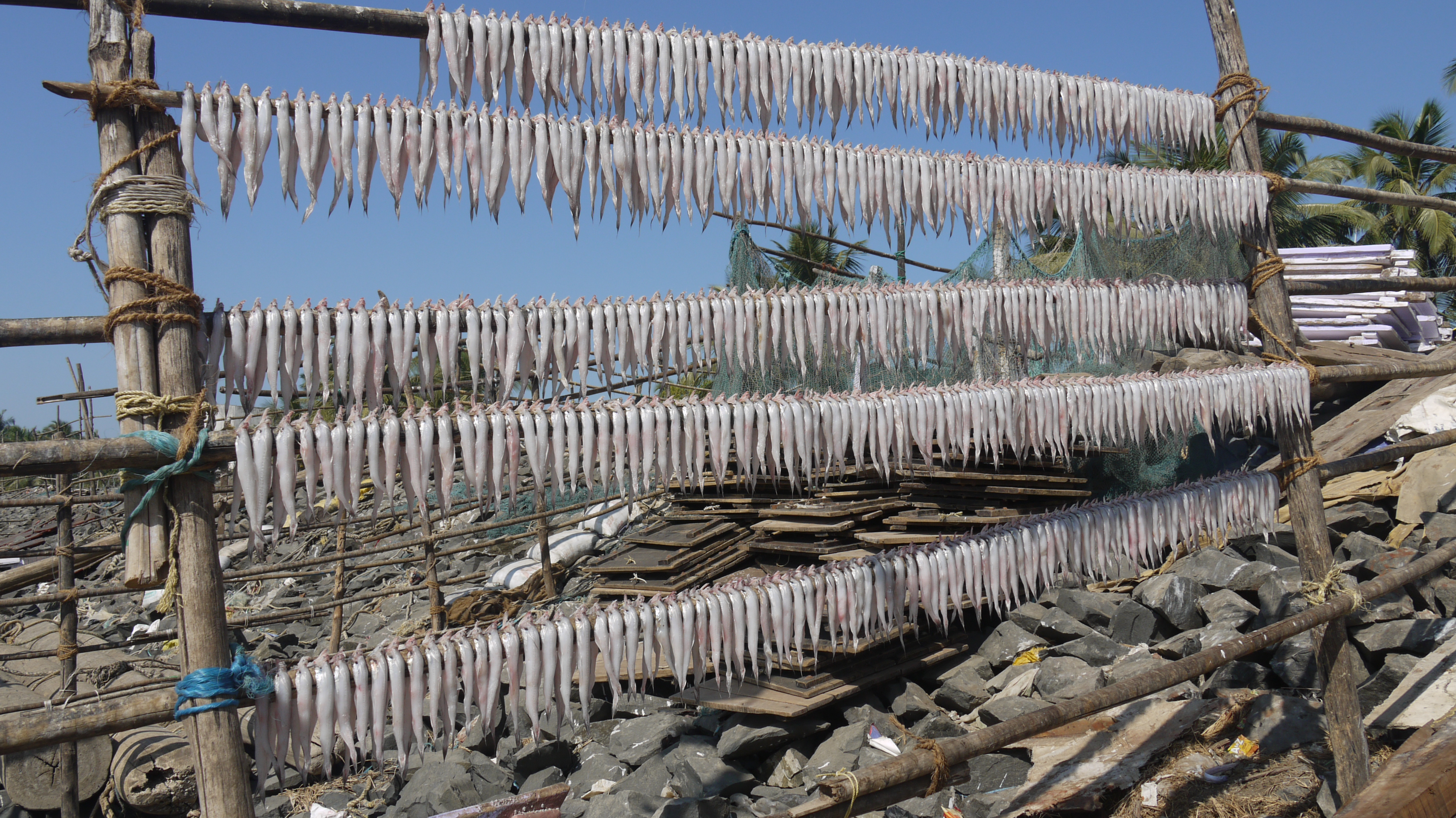
Bombay duck drying in open air

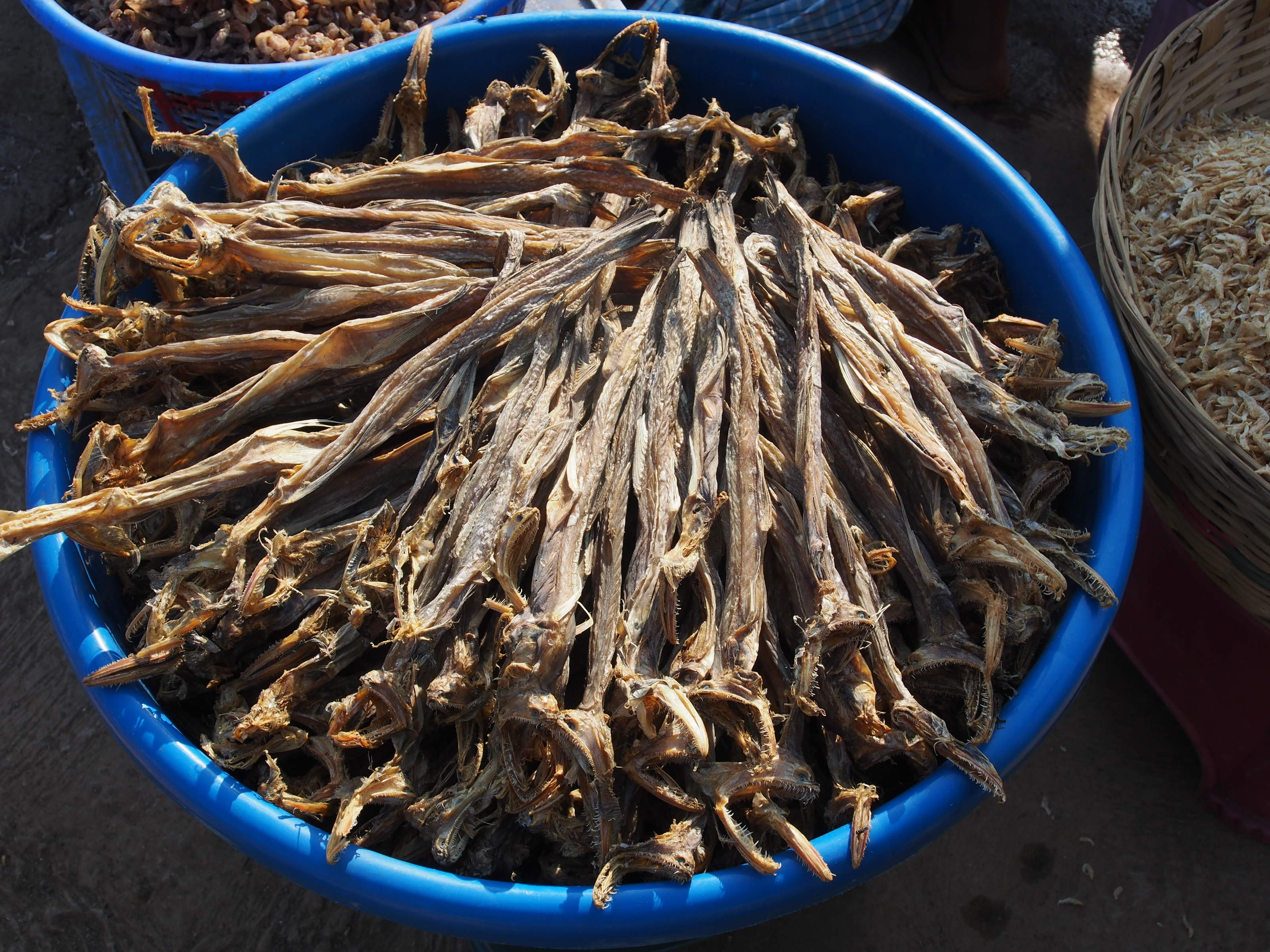
Dried Bombay duck for sale in Maharashtra
