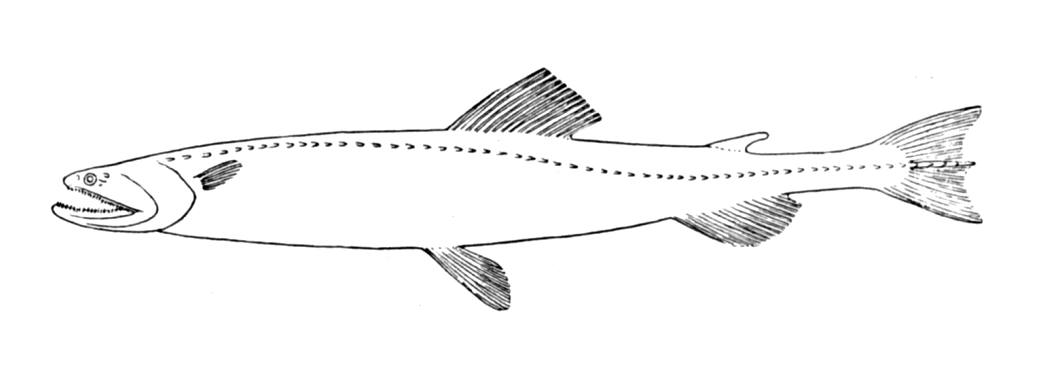
- Harpadon microchir

Scientific classification
- Kingdom: Animalia
- Phylum: Chordata
- Class: Actinopterygii
- Order: Aulopiformes
- Suborder: Aulopoidei
- Family: Harpadontidae

Genera
- See text

= Harpadontidae =

Subfamily of fishes

The Harpadontidae are a family of lizardfishes in the order Aulopiformes. It was formerly considered a subfamily of Synodontidae, but it is classified in a different suborder.

It comprises two genera:

- Harpadon
- Saurida
