= Searsid =

Searsid is a term used to refer to fish of the family Platytroctidae that resemble Searsia koefoedi. Fish referred to as searsids include:

- bigeye searsid (Holtbyrnia macrops)
- bighead searsid (Holtbyrnia anomala)
- Koefoed's searsid (Searsia koefoedi)
- legless searsid (Platytroctes apus)
- Maul's searsid (Maulisia mauli)
- multipore searsid (Normichthys operosus)
- palebelly searsid (Barbantus curvifrons)
- palegold searsid (Maulisia argipalla)
- Schnakenbeck's searsid (Sagamichthys schnakenbecki)
- smallscale searsid (Maulisia microlepis)
