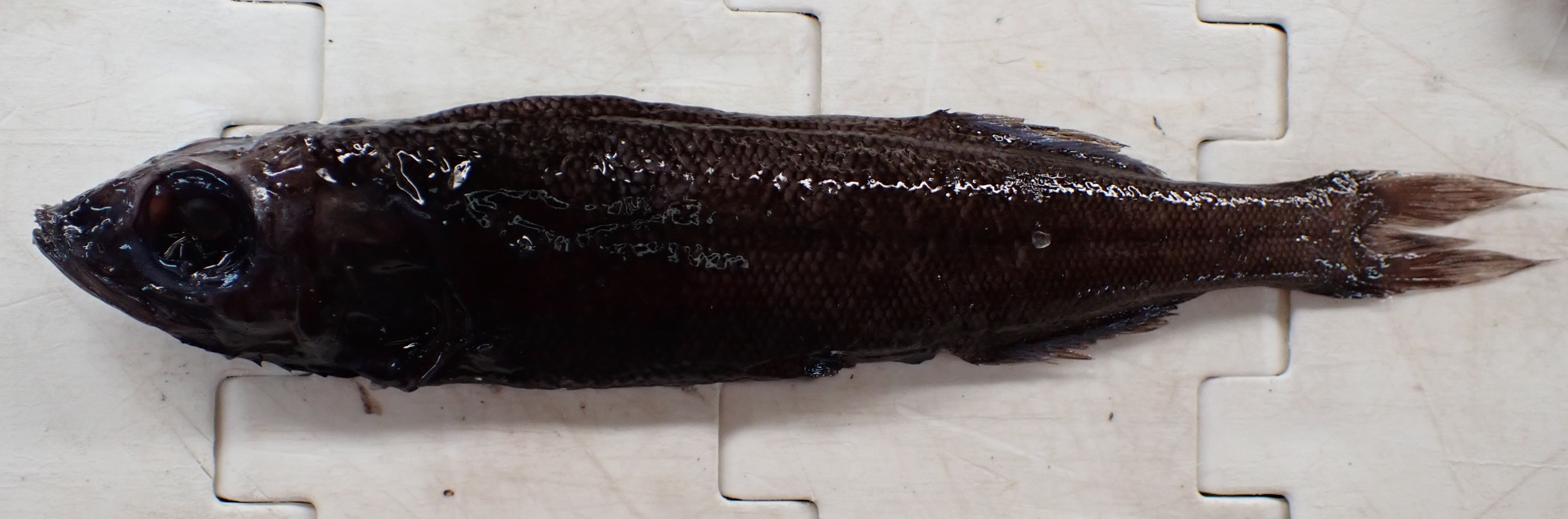

Conservation status
- Least Concern (IUCN 3.1)

Scientific classification
- Kingdom: Animalia
- Phylum: Chordata
- Class: Actinopterygii
- Order: Alepocephaliformes
- Family: Platytroctidae
- Genus: Normichthys
- Species: N. operosus

Binomial name
- Normichthys operosus (Parr, 1951)

Synonyms
- Normichthys operosa Parr, 1951; Normichthys operosa islandica Parr, 1960

= Multipore searsid =

Species of fish

The multipore searsid (Normichthys operosus) is a species of fish in the family Platytroctidae (tubeshoulders).

== Name ==
Its scientific name is from the Latin operōsus, "busy, hardworking".

Its common name "multipore" refers to the dermal pits located behind its shoulders, and "searsid" is a name used for fish that resemble Searsia koefoedi.

== Description ==
The multipore searsid is maximum 16.4 cm (6.5 in) long and is black or dark brown in colour. Its body is deep and compressed, its head about one-third of body length. It has a simple lateral line and few or no photophores. It has two to four large, and several smaller, open dermal pits behind the upper part of shoulder girdle, with usually at least one pit twice as wide as body scales; these give it the name "multipore".

== Habitat ==
The multipore searsid is bathypelagic, living in Atlantic Ocean at depths of 780–5,000 m (2,560–16,400 ft), but rarely going below 1,000 m (3,280 ft), following a 4 °C (39 °F) isotherm and being found near seamounts. It is most concentrated in the waters southwest of Ireland.
