= Florida Museum of Natural History =

Natural history museum in Florida, United States

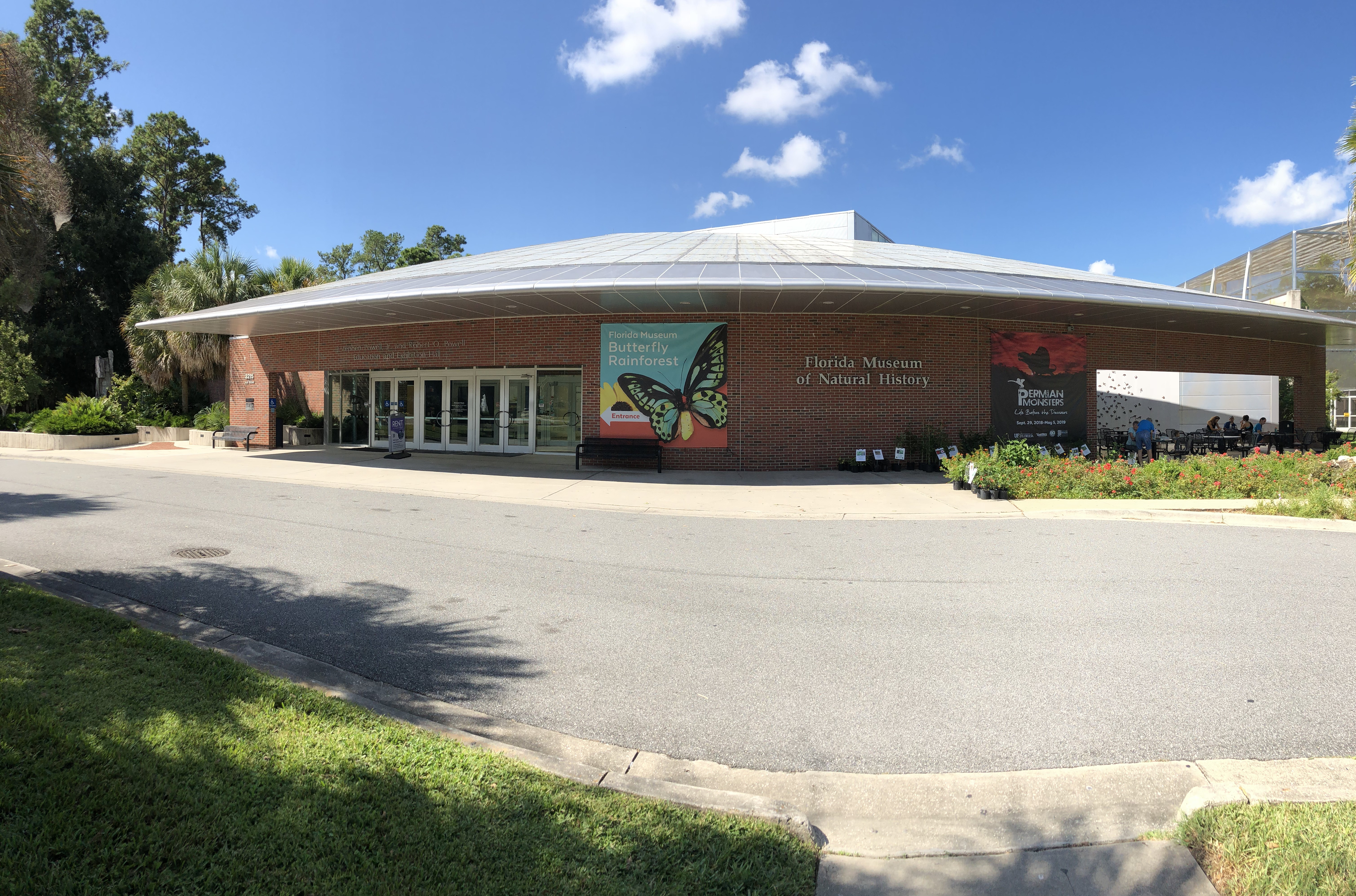

- Gainesville, Florida
- Established: 1891
- Location: 3215 Hull Rd., Gainesville, Florida
- Coordinates: 29°38′10″N 82°22′12″W
- Type: Natural history
- Visitors: 200,000 est. 2007
- Director: Dr. Douglas S. Jones.
- Public transit access: Family Housing Stop Route 20 & 21, RTS
- Website: floridamuseum.ufl.edu

The Florida Museum of Natural History (FLMNH; also branded as Florida Museum) is Florida's official state-sponsored and chartered natural history museum. Its main facilities are located at 3215 Hull Road on the campus of the University of Florida in Gainesville.

The role of the Florida Museum of Natural History as the official natural history museum for Florida, according to Florida Statute §1004.56, is "to make scientific investigations toward the sustained development of natural resources and a greater appreciation of human cultural heritage."

The main public exhibit facility, Powell Hall and the attached McGuire Center, is located in the Cultural Plaza, which it shares with the Samuel P. Harn Museum of Art and the Curtis M. Phillips Center for the Performing Arts. The main research facility and former public exhibits building, Dickinson Hall, is located on the east side of campus at the corner of Museum Road and Newell Drive. On April 18, 2012, the American Institute of Architects's Florida chapter listed Dickinson Hall on its list of "Florida Architecture: 100 Years. 100 Places" survey results as the "Florida Museum of Natural History / Formerly Florida Museum of Natural Sciences."

Powell Hall's permanent public exhibits focus on the flora, fauna, fossils, and historic peoples of the state of Florida. The museum does not charge for admission to most exhibits; the exceptions are the Butterfly Rainforest and certain traveling exhibits.

== Research ==
The Florida Museum of Natural History received $8 million in annual research revenue in 2024.

== History ==
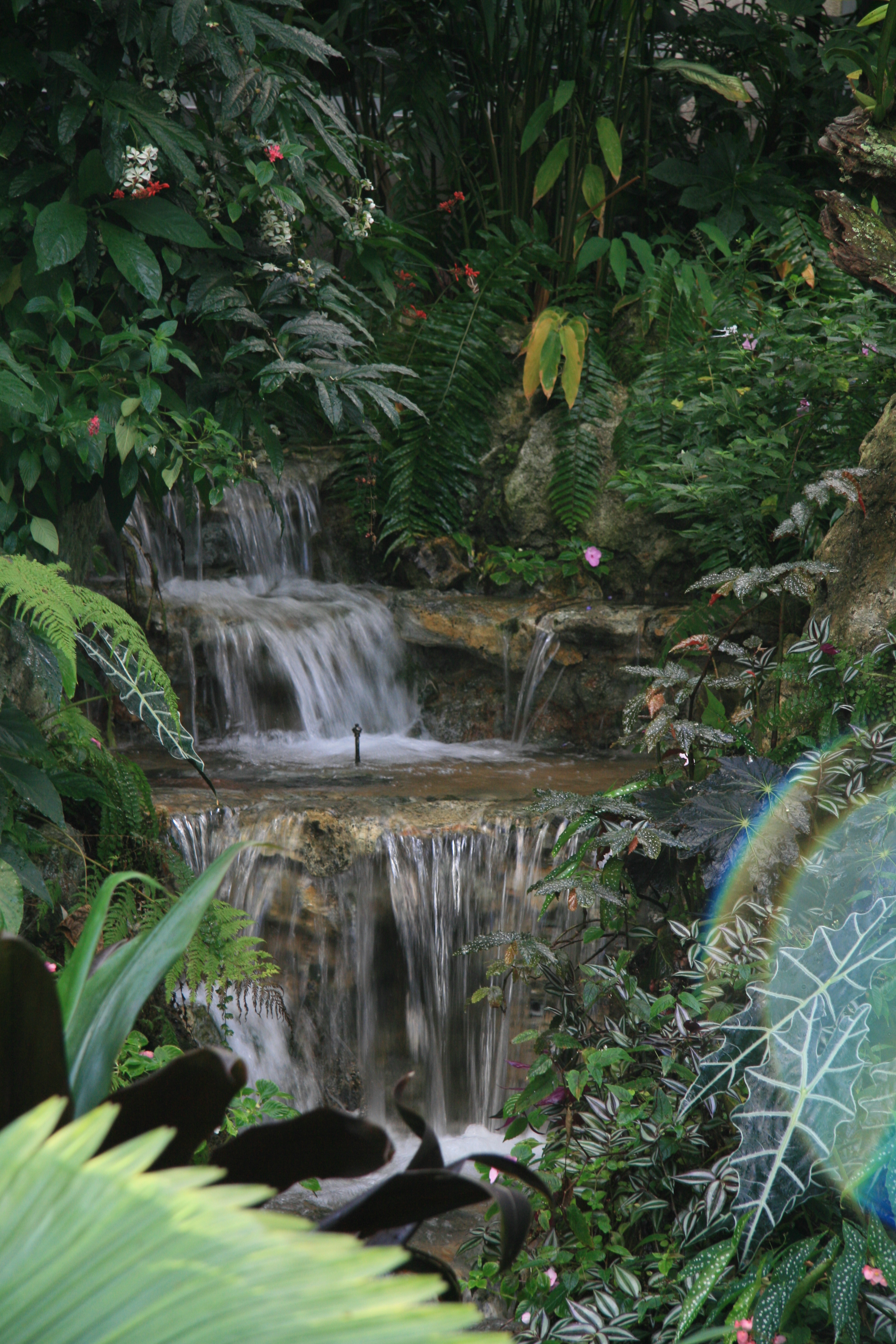
A waterfall in the Butterfly Rainforest

The museum's collections were first used for teaching at Florida Agriculture College in Lake City in the 1800s, and were relocated to the campus of the University of Florida in 1906. The museum was chartered as the state's official natural history museum by the Florida Legislature in 1917. Formerly known as the Florida State Museum, the name was changed in 1988 to more accurately reflect the museum's mission and help avoid confusion with Florida State University, which is located in Tallahassee.

== Current facilities ==
In its over 100 years of operation, the Florida Museum of Natural History has been housed in several buildings, from the Seagle Building in downtown Gainesville, to the three halls on campus and one off-site research facility.

=== Dickinson Hall ===
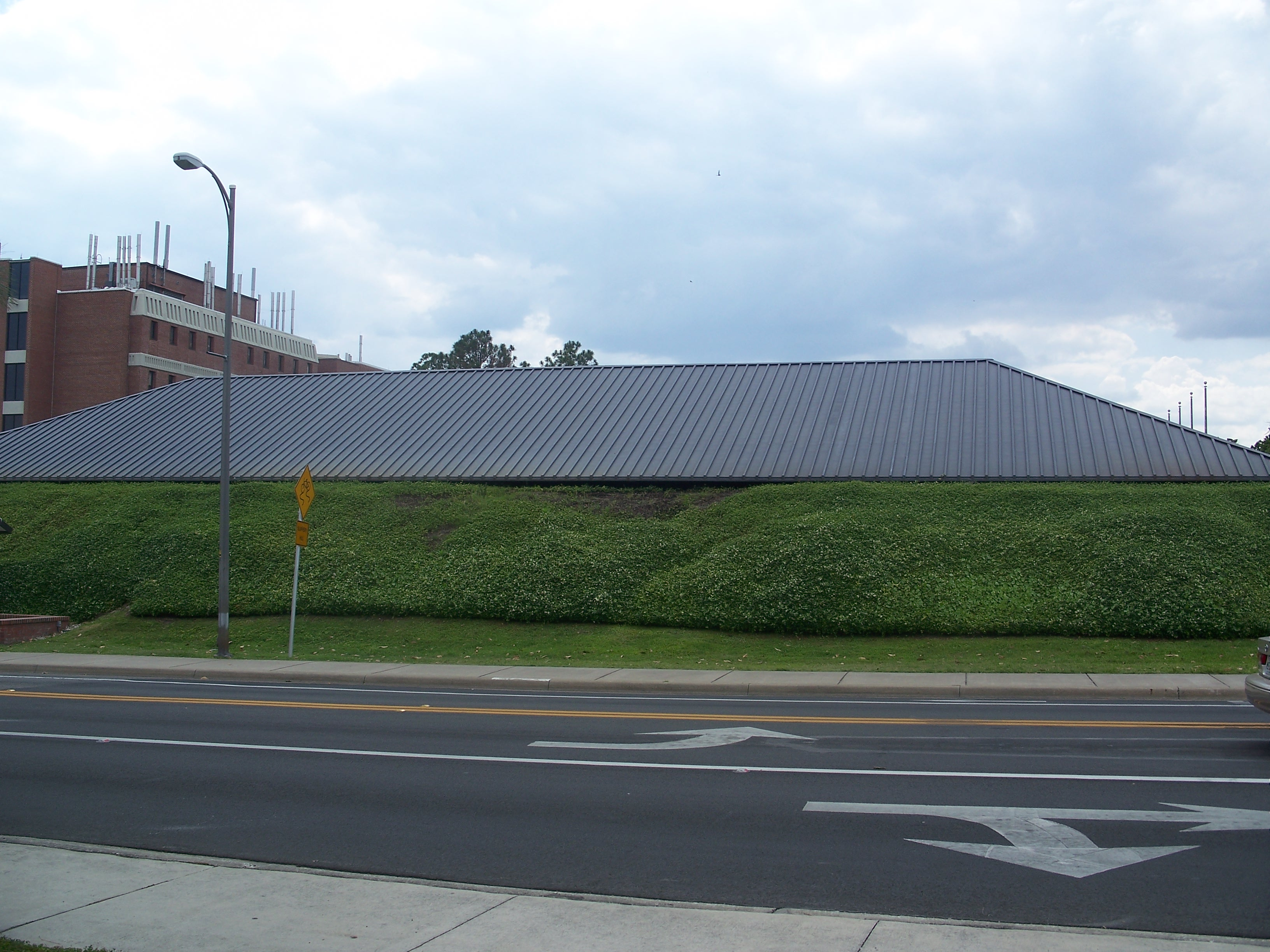
Dickinson Hall

Dickinson Hall, opened in 1971, is located on Museum Road. As of 2025, it housed over 25 million objects and artifacts in its collections, which cover the fields of ichthyology, paleontology (both vertebrate and invertebrate), botany, paleobotany and palynology, herpetology, malacology, mammalogy, ornithology, environmental archaeology, historical archaeology, archeology of the Caribbean and Florida, and ethnography of Latin and North Americas. It also houses a state-of-the-art Molecular Systematics and Evolutionary Genetics lab.

=== Powell Hall ===
Located in the University of Florida Cultural Plaza, Powell Hall was constructed in 1995 and opened in 1998. It serves, along with the connected McGuire Center, as the main exhibits and public programs facility. Powell Hall was partially funded from a gift of $3 million from two University of Florida alumni couples, Bob and Ann Powell and Steve and Carol Powell of Fort Lauderdale, with matching funds from the National Endowment for the Humanities and the Florida state government.

=== Randell Research Center ===
In 1996, the Randell family gave 53 acres (210,000 m^{2}) of the 240-acre (0.97 km^{2}), internationally significant Pineland Site Complex in Lee County to the University of Florida, which the museum now operates as the Randell Research Center. This research and education program is an extension of the museum's Southwest Florida Project and "Year of the Indian" archeology/education project.

In 2008, the Randell Research Center completed a two-year program to plant more than 800 native trees to replace ones destroyed in the 2004 hurricanes Charley and Frances.

=== McGuire Center for Lepidoptera and Biodiversity ===
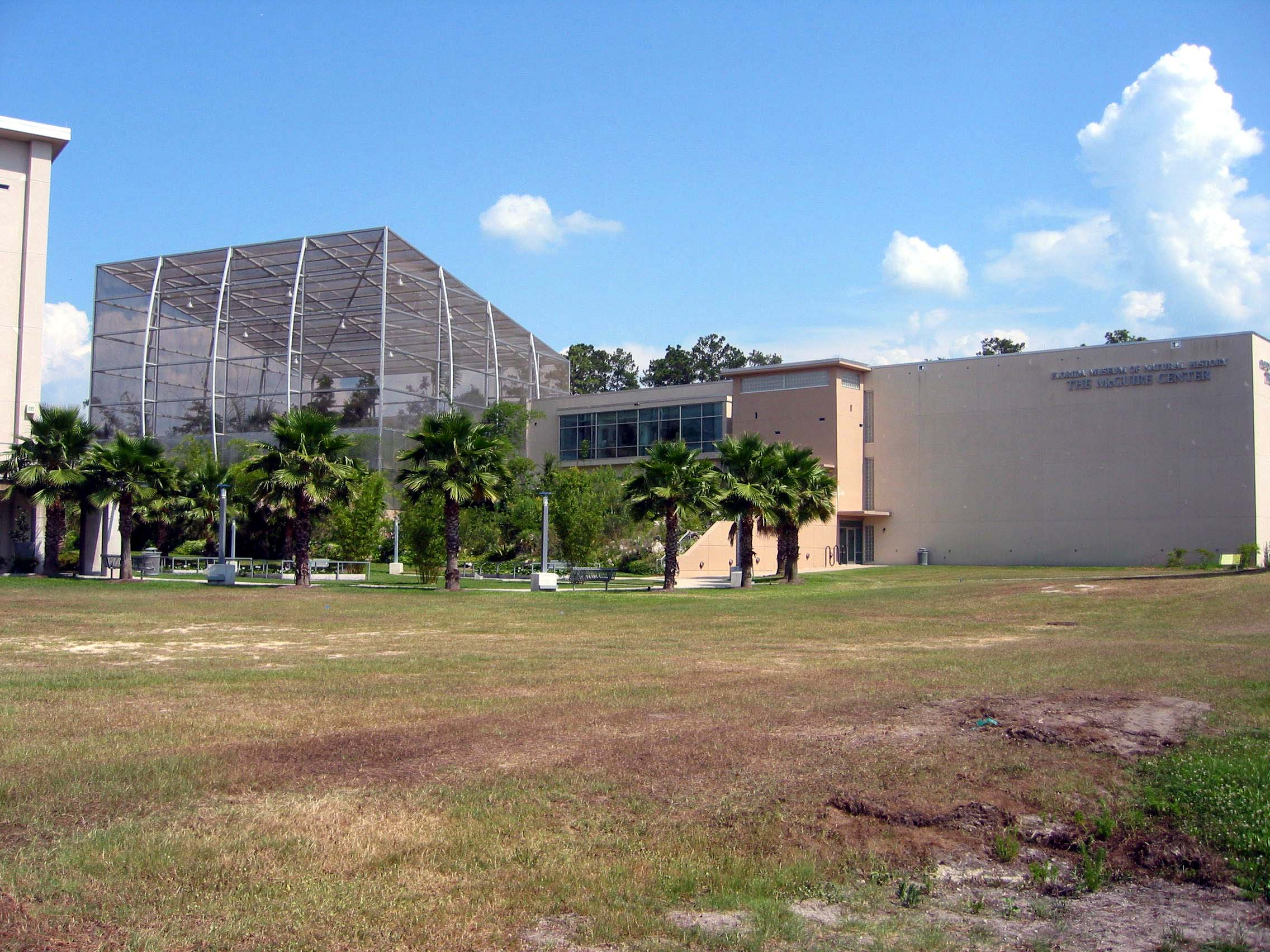
The outside of the McGuire Center for Biodiversity and Lepodoptra

In 2000, William W. McGuire, then CEO of UnitedHealth Group, gave a $4.2 million gift to establish the William W. and Nadine M. McGuire Center for Lepidoptera and Biodiversity. This gift was one of the largest private gifts ever given to foster research on insects, and was matched by the State of Florida Alec Courtelis Facilities Enhancement Challenge Grant Program. The McGuires later gave another $3 million to fund final construction of the center. This new $12 million facility for Lepidoptera research and public exhibits opened in August 2004.

The center houses a collection of more than 10 million butterfly and moth specimens, making it one of the largest collections of Lepidoptera in the world, rivaling that of the Natural History Museum in London. The collection includes extinct species. It started with around four million specimens, with space for significant further expansion. The collection brings together those from the Allyn Museum in Sarasota, other University of Florida collections, and the State of Florida's Division of Plant Industry collections.

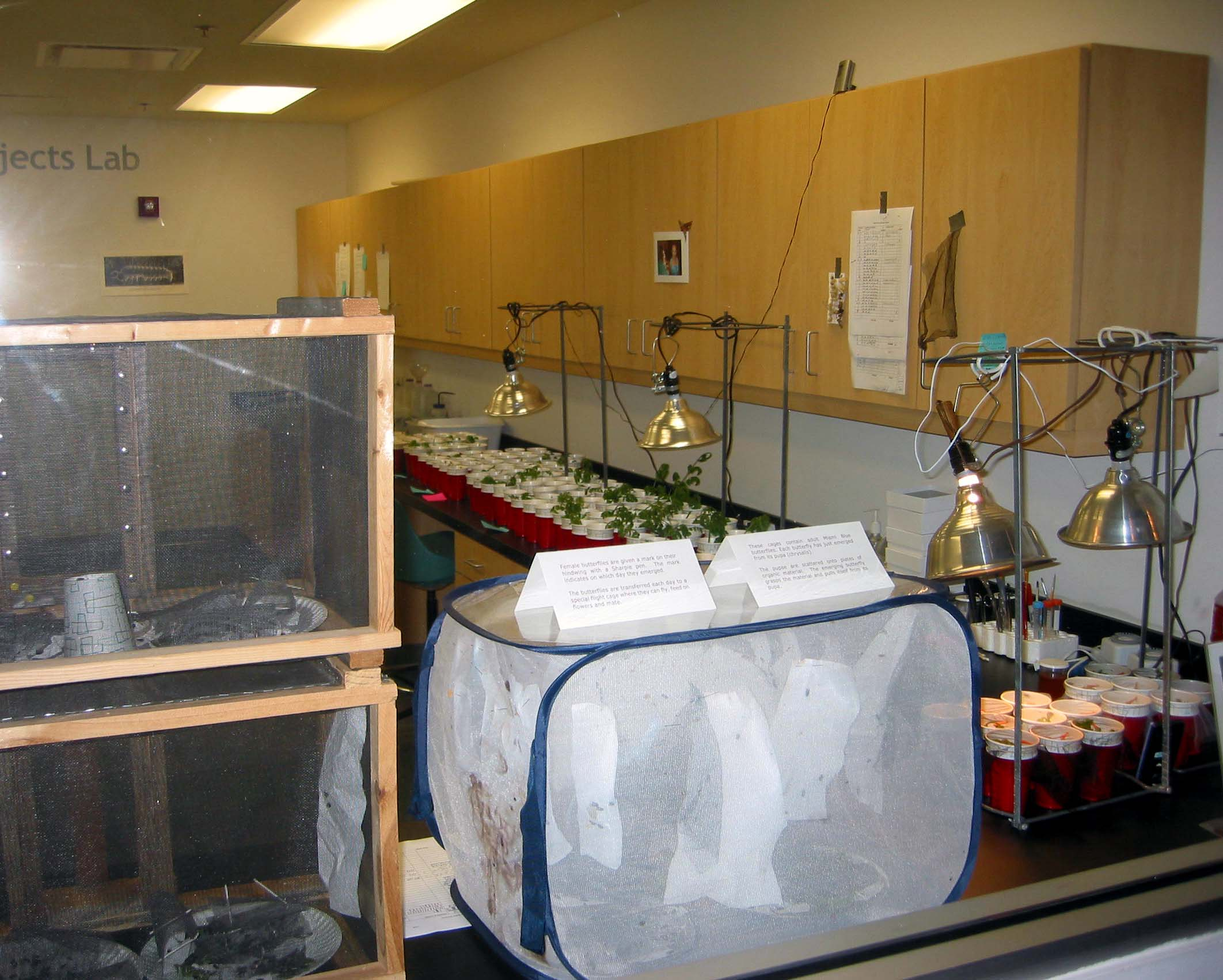
A lab in the McGuire Center

The McGuire Center for Lepidoptera and Biodiversity serves both research and public education functions. The center includes the living Butterfly Rainforest and exhibit space that features information about lepidoptera and rainforests worldwide, as well as 39,000 square feet (3,600 m^{2}) of research laboratories and collection space.

The research space includes laboratories focusing on molecular genetics, scanning electron microscopy, image analysis, conservation and captive propagation of endangered species, optical microscopy, and specimen preparation, as well as classrooms and offices for 12 faculty curators, collection managers, and other staff. Some of the research laboratories and collections can be viewed through glass panels at the back of the museum.

== Public exhibits ==
As of March 2025, the museum's public exhibits are closed for construction until July 2026. Renovations will include a new, permanent display by the Thompson Earth Sciences Institute, titled "Earth to Florida."

=== Butterfly Rainforest ===
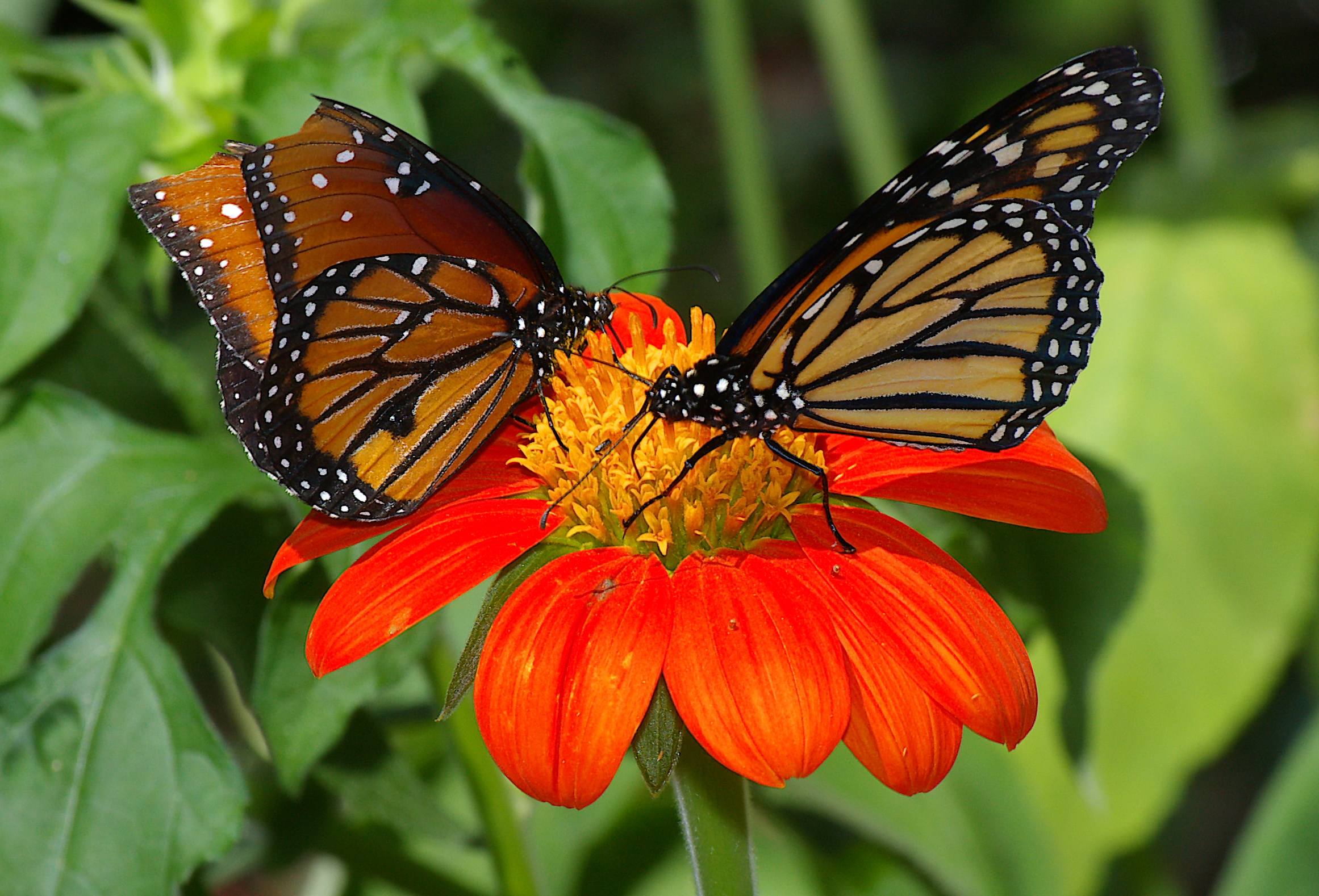
A queen (left) and a monarch (right) in the Butterfly Rainforest.

The Butterfly Rainforest is a display of live butterflies in a large, outdoor enclosed space attached to the museum. It is the main exhibit in the McGuire Center which is accessed from the main entrance of Powell Hall. At any given time, the exhibit contains over 50 species of butterfly and moth species, totaling some 1,000 individuals. The butterflies are brought from around the world as chrysalises and released into the exhibit after emerging as adults. There are live butterfly releases every weekday at 2 p.m. Other features of the facility include over 600 plant species, waterfalls, and a controlled fog system.

=== Florida Fossils: Evolution of Life & Land ===
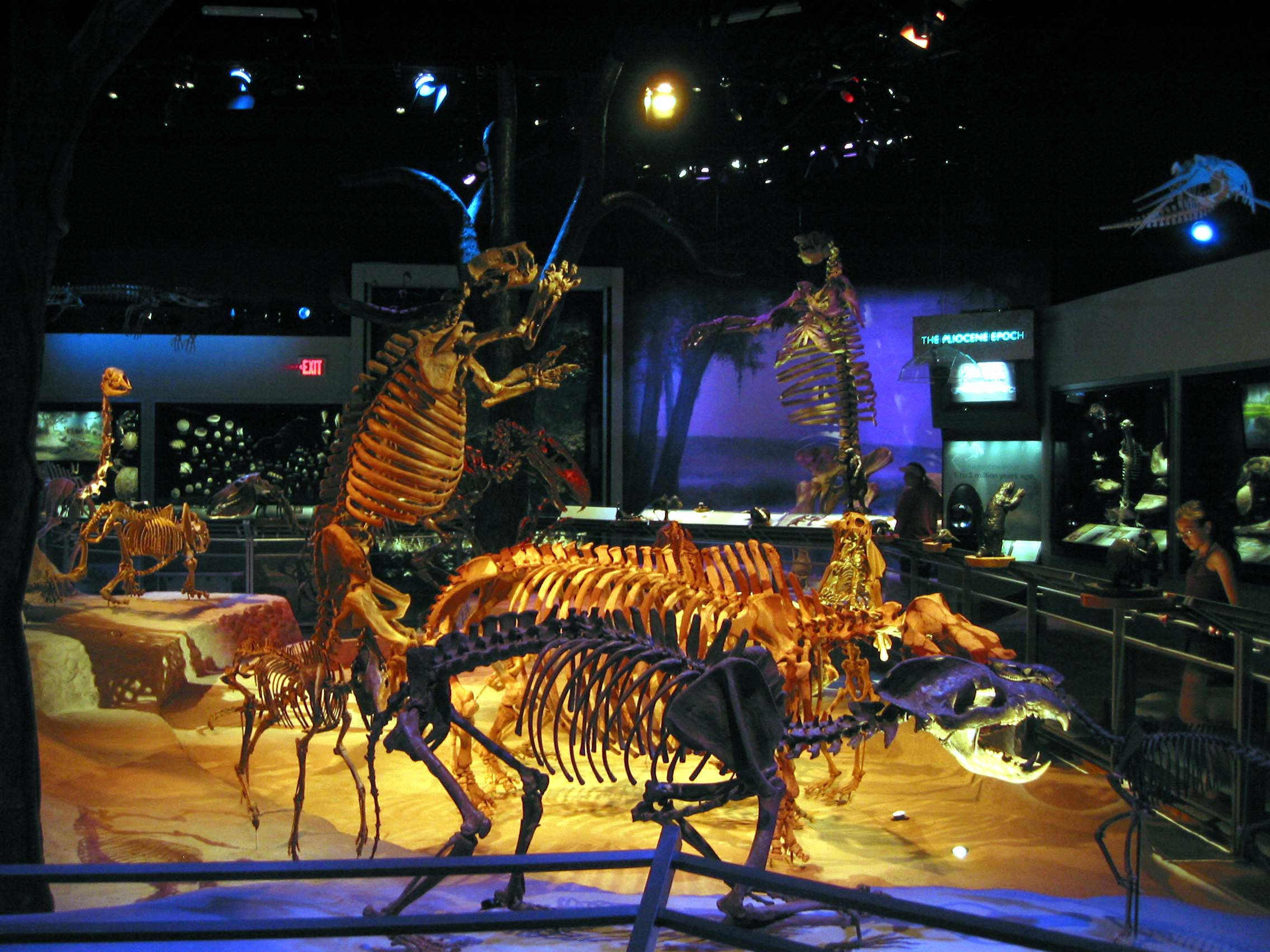
A collection of fossils in the Florida Fossil Hall.

Located in Powell Hall, this $2.5 million, 5,000-square-foot (460 m^{2}) exhibit describes the history of the Florida Platform through five geologic time periods.

The entrance to the hall showcases six fossil shark jaws, ranging in height from 2–9 ft (0.61–2.74 m). The exhibition begins with five extinction events described in dioramas that lead visitors onto the Florida Platform at about 66 million years ago, at the Dawn of the Age of Mammals. The exhibition then takes visitors on a walk through time, beginning in the Eocene epoch, when Florida was underwater, and going through the Oligocene, Miocene, Pliocene and Pleistocene epochs. Visitors see Florida's first land animals, evolving grasslands and savannahs and the land bridge between North and South America that formed about 3 million years ago. The exhibit ends with the arrival of the first humans in Florida, near the end of the Pleistocene.

Displays include a primitive toothed whale from the Eocene, an oreodont from the Oligocene, a Miocene rhinoceros being attacked by two saber-toothed, cat-like animals, a 15-foot (4.6 m)-tall sloth standing on its hind legs in the Pliocene area and a 500,000-year-old jaguar chasing a peccary from the Pleistocene epoch. The time periods also include artwork by paleoartists from around the world, including a 9-foot (2.7 m)-tall steel sculpture of an extinct Terror Bird, titanis walleri. Over 90 percent of the exhibit's 500 fossils are real, and many were found within 100 miles (160 km) of Gainesville.

=== South Florida People & Environments ===
This exhibit, also in Powell Hall, consists of ten exhibit galleries that occupy a total of 6,050 square feet (562 m^{2}). The sequence of galleries is designed to give visitors a variety of experiences, including 3D immersion environments and more focused learning centers.

Visitors enter the exhibit through a re-created scene of a Calusa fishing village as it may have looked about 500 years ago. A young Calusa boy carries a shark on his shoulder, and behind him lies the village and view toward the Gulf of Mexico. Just past the village are four large glass wall panels depicting southwest Florida Indian art and environments. Beyond the panels is an orientation area, large enough for docents and teachers to gather a small group and introduce the exhibit. Interpretive panels preview the content and themes of the hall, augmented by a collage mural of south Florida people and environments.

==== Mangrove Boardwalk Gallery ====
Visitors walk onto a wooden boardwalk into a full-scale re-creation of a southwest Florida mangrove forest and seagrass estuary. The boardwalk passes through mangrove trees, mudflats, and simulated water, featuring insect, bird, and water sounds and slow changes in lighting. A huge, 360-degree mural painting extends the view to distant barrier islands, bird rookeries, an upland area, and the heart of mangrove forests. Interpretive panels introduce the critical stories of the rich estuarine environment.

==== Natural Habitats Center ====
This gallery features exhibits about the environments of South Florida and estuary ecosystems.

==== Underwater Walk-through ====
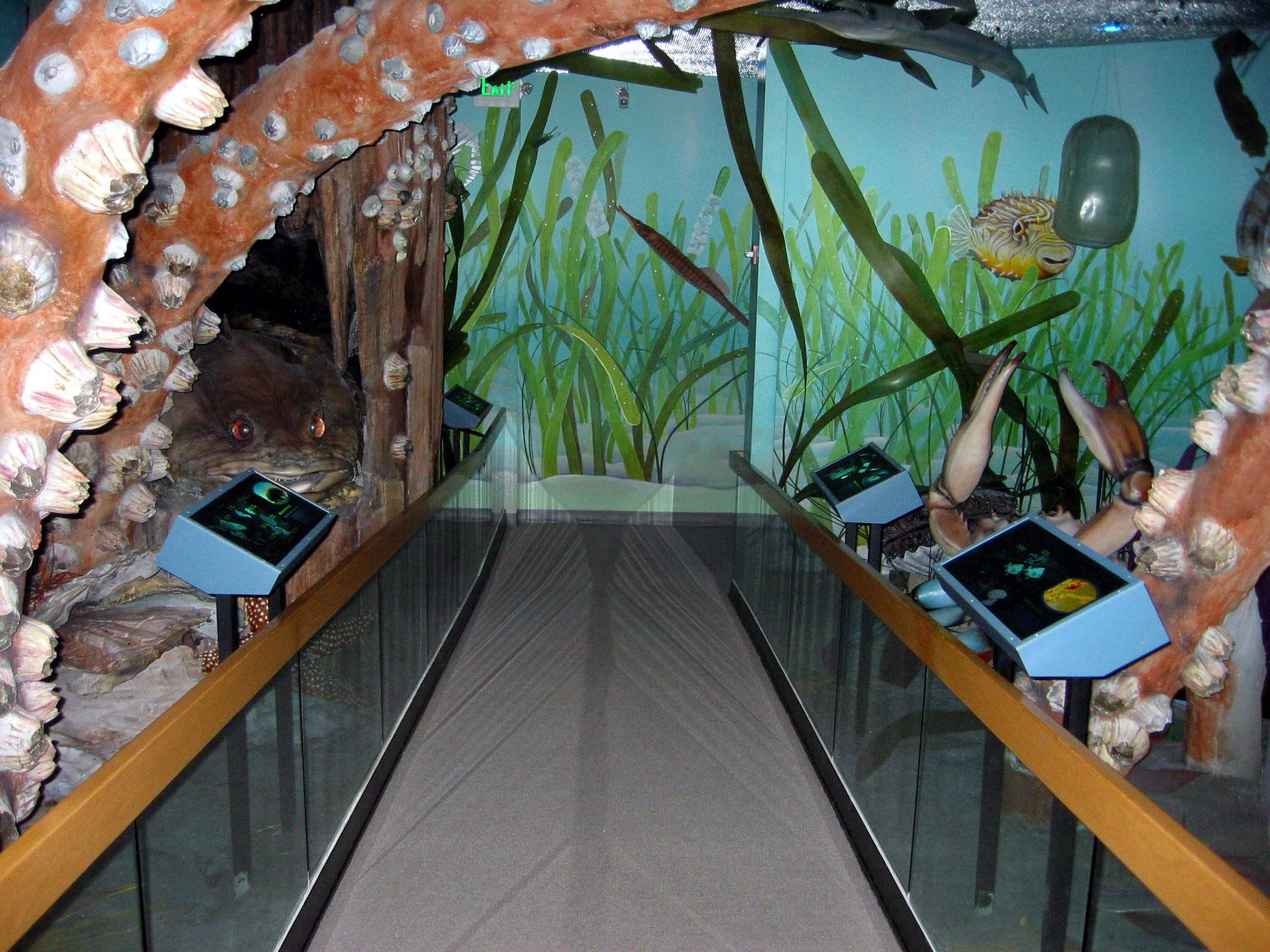
The giant estuary in the Southwest Florida Hall.

This gallery features a 12-times life-size underwater scene to explore the tiny organisms that sustain the estuary, brought to life by large sculptures of plants, fish, and invertebrates that surround the walkway.

==== Fishing Heritage Gallery ====
This artifact-rich gallery highlights 6,000 years of fishing along Florida's Gulf coast. Displays focus on the fishing industry of the Calusa, their predecessors, and traditions that carried into the 20th century. It explores the significance of maritime adaptation as a basis for social and political complexity through topics such as fish, nets, native and post-contact fishing techniques, watercraft, and waterworks. This includes the remarkable engineering endeavors of the Calusa, who constructed large canals across southwest Florida, and their long-lived net-fishing tradition. Interactive multimedia stations illustrate topics such as net making and cordage manufacture, and a miniature diorama of a fishing village captures the essence of Calusa fishing. Artifacts include 1,000-year-old palm-fiber fishing nets, Calusa net-making tools, a wide range of shell tools, and an ancient wooden canoe paddle.

==== Calusa Mound and Village ====
The dominant feature of this gallery is a large picture window and view of an outdoor mound, where sculptures of a Calusa family stand on the mound next to a palm-thatched house. Inside, interpretive panels discuss mounds and Calusa town plans. Next to the window, an interactive model shows a cutaway view of a mound and explains archaeologists' methods of interpreting the past.

==== Calusa Leader's House ====
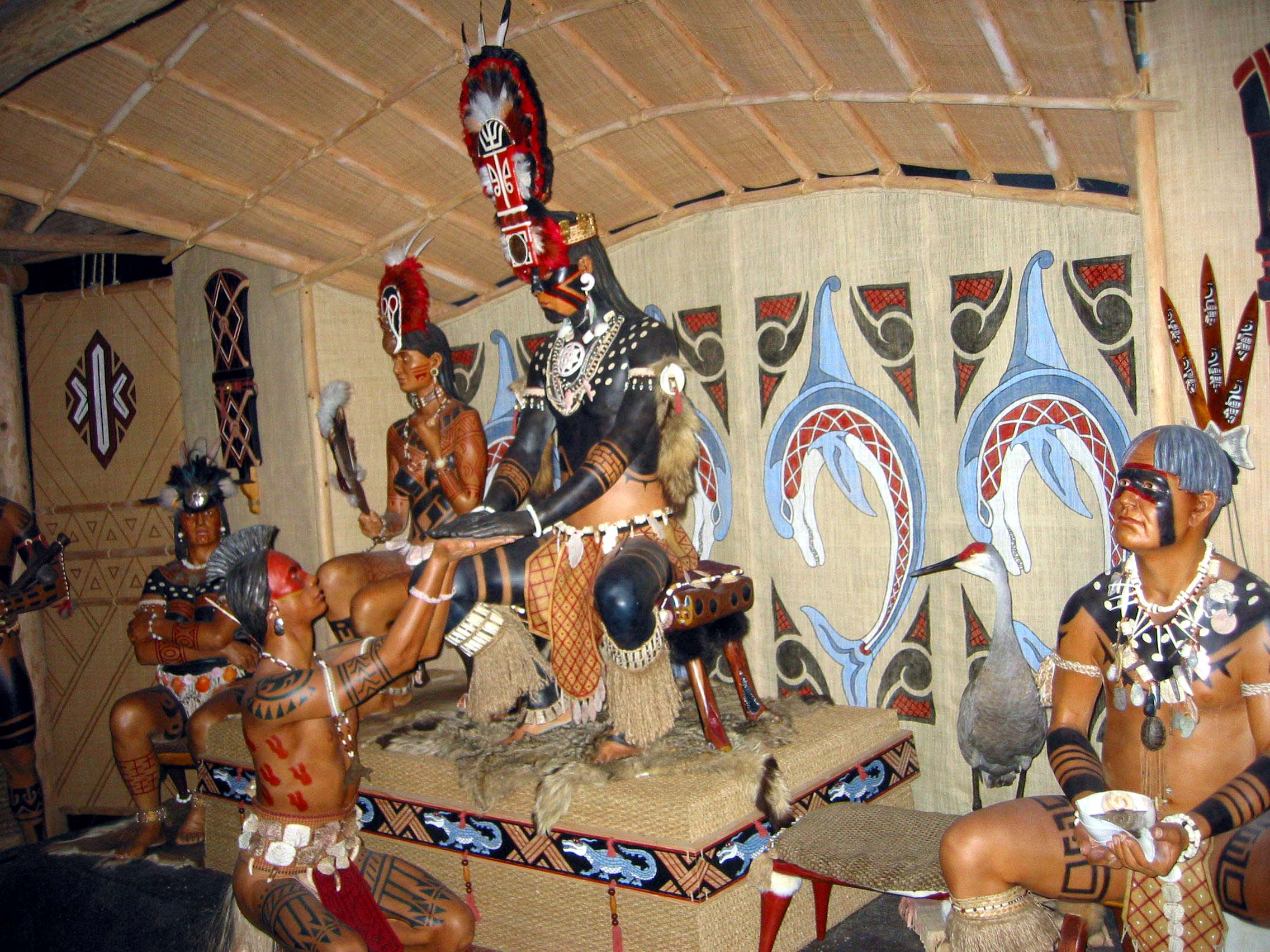
The inside of the chief's hut in the Southwest Florida Hall.

This gallery showcases the society of the Calusa through a dramatic re-created scene. Visitors enter a palm-thatched building and find themselves in a Calusa leader's house during a political ceremony, featuring six human sculptures, based on known individuals from historic Spanish documents. The setting is the Calusa capital town of Calos in the year 1564. A distant chief is visiting the Calusa leader and his close associates. Interpretive panels explain topics such as Calusa politics, social organization, and spiritual beliefs. Artifacts from the museum's collections complement the stories and include shell, bone, and metal ornaments as well as objects traded to the Calusa from places as far away as Missouri.

==== South Florida's Native American Legacy Gallery ====
The Legacy Gallery presents some of the most rare and interesting objects in the South Florida collections. These include a 1,000-year-old hand-carved wooden panel with a painting of the near-extinct ivory-billed woodpecker, a wooden panel with a painted alligator, wooden figurines of animals and humans, ornaments made from precious metals, and numerous other carved wooden and bone objects. Interpretive panels discuss South Florida sites of special significance, including "wet sites", which can yield detailed information when excavated with care and when recovered objects are appropriately treated. A multimedia interactive further explains the process of properly preserving and caring for wet-site materials.

==== Today's South Florida Indian People ====
This gallery is devoted to the Indian people who live in South Florida today: the Seminole and Miccosukee. Interpretive panels address their history and their living traditions. Display cases feature many objects from the museum's collections, including patchwork clothing, woodwork, basketry, silverwork, and artifacts from early Seminole sites.

=== Water Shapes Florida ===
Opened in 2024, Water Shapes Florida replaced "Northwest Florida: Waterways and Wildlife." The new exhibit focuses on Florida's freshwater and wildlife and features a mix of interactive elements, wildlife replicas, and a simulation of a boat tour.

=== Florida Wildflower and Butterfly Garden ===
This garden is located next to the west side of the McGuire Center. The Florida Wildflower Council appropriated funds from the Florida wildflower license tag revenue in order to fund this garden, the accompanying brochure, and a wildflower and butterfly display in the Florida Museum of Natural History. The display shows the life cycles of four butterflies, and depicts how the plants they use change in appearance over the four seasons.

=== Changing Gallery ===
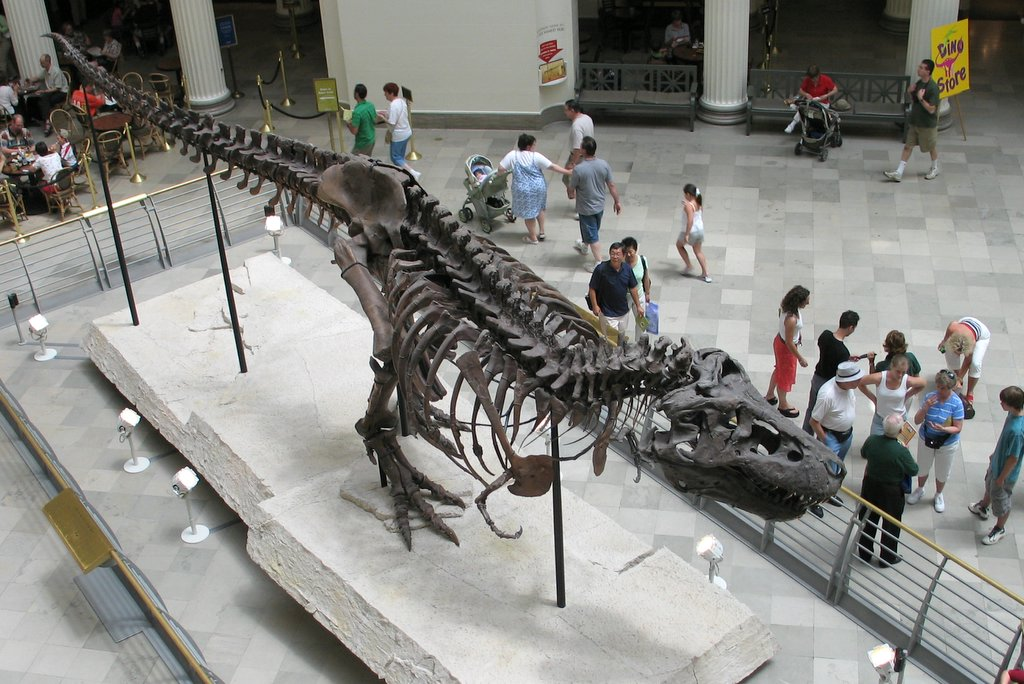
Sue visited in 2002.

The Changing Gallery is a 5,000 sq ft (460 m^{2}) hall, also located in Powell Hall, which has hosted several travelling exhibitions. Early exhibitions included Megalodon: Largest Shark that Ever Lived; Hatching the Past; Chocolate: The Exhibition; Tibet: Mountains and Valleys, Castles and Tents; A T. rex Named Sue (featuring Sue the Tyrannosaurus rex); and Inside Africa, the latter two of which originated from the Field Museum in Chicago, Il.

In the 2010s, exhibits included Titanoboa: Monster Snake; Permian Monsters: Life Before the Dinosaurs; Wondrous Creatures: Where Science & Art Intersect; and Whale People: Protectors of the Sea.

From October 7, 2023, to April 21, 2024, the Changing Gallery hosted Antarctic Dinosaurs, also from the Field Museum.

== Research collections ==
With the exception of the Lepidoptera collection (located in the McGuire Center) and the Special Collections Building, almost all other research collections are located in Dickinson Hall.

=== Lepidoptera ===
This collection, unlike the rest of the museum's collections, is housed at the McGuire Center. This department is relatively new when compared to the other collections and departments, although their research is quite extensive. The museum describes their collection as "taxonomically comprehensive" and notes that it contains "more than 10 million specimens." As of 2026, over 150,000 of their specimens can be viewed online in the museum's database.

=== Special Collections Building ===
Opened in 2022 and located directly across from Powell Hall, the Special Collections Building contains wet collections from ichthyology, herpetology, and invertebrate zoology. It is closed to the public, as it is intended to be a workspace for researchers.

=== Mammalogy ===
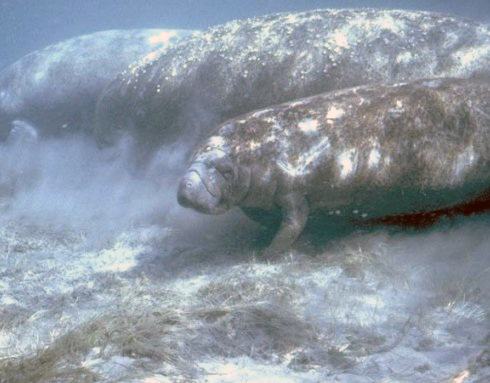
West Indian manatee

Throughout its history, the mammalogy collection at Dickinson Hall has undergone rapid growth and expansion. As of 1973, the collection included nearly 16,000 specimens, and the recorded growth for 1972-1979 was 290 specimens per year, per the survey of North American collections of recent mammals. The average growth rate of the collection between 1984-1989 was 800 specimens per year, and, between 1989 and 1994, it was 640 specimens per year. Between 1979 and 2007, the collection doubled, increasing from 14,000 to over 30,000 specimens. Since 2002, the Florida Museum has acquired the University of Miami's cetacean collection and the U.S. Fish and Wildlife Service's manatee collection.

As of 2026, the mammalogy collection has over 38,000 cataloged specimens, all of which can be browsed online. It consists primarily of skins and skulls, although entire skeletons have been prepared from all specimens acquired since 1992. There are 205 large tanned skins and 6,900 specimens, roughly 19% of the collection, have been preserved in fluid. The collection is preponderated by small mammals, primarily rodents (over 21,500) and bats (over 7,700) from the southeastern US, the Caribbean, Latin America, South-America, including roughly 2,750 rodent specimens from Pakistan.

An important component of the mammalogy collection is the marine mammal collection, consisting, as of 2026, of over 300 manatees and over 800 dolphins and whales. The large size of the collection is the result of a long-term cooperative effort with the USGS's Sirenia research project, Marine Mammal Stranding Network, researchers David and Melba Caldwell, and Marineland of Florida. Other major collections that have been acquired and/or cataloged over the past 15 years include:

- Cross Florida Barge Canal collection (from the Florida Game & Fresh Water Fish Commission) of 1,800 small mammals).
- Bowen collection of 3,400 beach mice (Peromyscus polionotus).
- James Layne collection of 2,100 small mammals from Archbold Biological Station.
- Involvement with the Florida Panther Recovery Program has resulted in the only significant collection of this endangered subspecies in the entire United States, which has, as of 2024, fewer than 200 individuals.

Orphaned or donated collections account for approximately 60% of reported growth.

The mammal collection is primarily a research collection, but experiences a broad range of uses beyond this primary function. It is used as a teaching collection for undergraduate and graduate students; a reference collection for law enforcement when identifying endangered species; a reference collection for carnivore feeding studies; and comparative material for students and faculty of zoo archeology and vertebrate paleontology. As part of a large university, the research uses of the collection are diverse, including applications in biomedical studies, wildlife dentistry, and even studies of environmental contaminants. As the concern for Florida's environment increases, so does the monitoring of habitats and species by state and federal biologists, resulting in an increased interest in the historical and recent distributions of mammals in Florida by a variety of state and federal agencies.

=== Ichthyology ===
The Florida Museum of Natural History's ichthyology department was founded in 1917, when the museum was officially chartered. In the 1970s, it received a portion of the Tropical Atlantic Biological Labs (TABL) collections and, in 1982, received the Florida State University fish collection of about 273,000 cataloged and many uncataloged specimens. In 1995, about 350,000 cataloged and about 400,000 uncataloged specimens were transferred from the University of Miami Marine Lab. In this same year, the ichthyological collection was ranked by the American Society of Ichthyologists and Herpetologists as the tenth most important fish specimen resource in the North America and the second most important National Center. Since that survey was completed, the 65,000 lot University of Miami collection was transferred and is currently being integrated into complete collection. In 2018, the FLMNH's ichthyological collection was the second largest in the US by number of specimens.

By 2025, the collection contained nearly 240,000 cataloged lots, comprising over 2.5 million specimens and representing more than 8,000 species. In addition, there is an unsorted backlog of about 12,000 lots, comprising about 120,000 specimens. Most of the uncatalogued and backlog material was acquired through transfer of the TABL collection, previously housed at the National Marine Fisheries Service in Miami, in Pascagoula, MS, and at the University of Miami. The collection currently contains primary and secondary types of more than 950 taxa of freshwater and marine fishes. As of 2026, over 240,000 specimens can be viewed online in the museum's database.

The osteological collection comprises 2,500 lots of disarticulated skeletons, representing over 320 species. Skeletal holdings emphasize the southeastern United States, Caribbean, Central American and northwestern South American ichthyofaunas. Representative specimens of over 700 species have been cleared and stained. A radiograph collection and the original field notes of numerous individuals and organizations, including station sheets for virtually all U.S. Fish and Wildlife Service/National Marine Fisheries Service and University of Miami research vessels, are maintained.

The principal strengths of the fish collection are its holdings of western and eastern Atlantic shelf and deep water marine fishes; western Atlantic reef fishes; North American freshwater fishes, especially from the southeastern United States; freshwater fishes of Southeast Asia; and freshwater fishes from Central America, South America and the West Indies.

Most of the material acquired from the TABL collection consists of western Atlantic fishes from nearshore shallows to moderate depths, with the families Argentinidae, Atherinidae, Balistidae, Batrachoididae, Belonidae, Bothidae, Branchiostomatidae, Caproidae, Carangidae, Clupeidae, Congridae, Cynoglossidae, Dasyatidae, Engraulididae, Exocoetidae, Fundulidae, Gadidae, Gerreidae, Haemulidae, Hemiramphidae, Lutjanidae, Macrouridae, Monacanthidae, Mugilidae, Ogcocephalidae, Ophichthidae, Ophidiidae, Paralichthyidae, Peristediidae, Priacanthidae, Rajidae, Sciaenidae, Scombridae, Serranidae, Scorpaenidae, Scyliorhinidae, Soleidae, Sparidae, Sphyraenidae, Stromateidae, Squalidae, Syngnathidae, Synodontidae, Tetraodontidae, and Triglidae being most common. These collections have been substantially augmented by the field activities of museum personnel and donations made over the last 20 years. Eastern Atlantic collections from the Gulf of Guinea are available in abundance. The western Atlantic collections, acquired from the National Marine Fisheries Service Pascagoula laboratory and University of Miami, are generally from greater depths and represent some of the museum's most valuable resources. Deepwater anguilliform, salmoniform, stomiiform, aulopiform, myctophiform, and ophidiiform families are particularly well represented. For certain families, such as Searsiodes and Alepocephalidae, these collections may be among the best North American holdings from the western Atlantic region.

The holdings of western Atlantic reef fishes are among the most important in existence, with the following geographic areas most heavily collected: Florida, the Bahamas, Isla de Providencia, the Cayman Islands, the Virgin Islands and the Lesser Antilles. Smaller numbers of reef fish collections exist from Puerto Rico, Jamaica, Sombrero Island, other Lesser Antilles islands, continental islands off northern South America, Brazil, and Ascension Island. There are a substantial number of reef fishes from off the Carolinas. Major reef groups represented include the Acanthuridae, Antennariidae, Apogonidae, Blenniidae, Chaenopsidae, Chaetodontidae, Clinidae, Dactyloscopidae, Gobiesocidae, Gobiidae, Grammistidae, Haemulidae, Holocentridae, Kyphosidae, Labridae, Lutjanidae, Mullidae, Muraenidae, Ostraciidae, Opistognathidae, Pomacanthidae, Pomacentridae, Scaridae, Serranidae, and Tripterygiidae. Eastern Pacific reef collections are present from the Pearl Islands south to Ecuador. Also available are a fair number of Indo-Pacific reef fishes acquired by staff collecting and donations received from the Bishop Museum and the National Museum of Natural History. Over 200 shore and estuarine collections have been made from the Caribbean coasts of Costa Rica and Panama.

The museum's worldwide holdings of elasmobranchs, particularly squaloid sharks, have grown rapidly in the last 15 years and are an important international resource. Other elasmobranch groups prominently represented include Carcharhinidae, Dasyatidae, Gymnuridae, Myliobatidae, Rajidae, Rhinobatidae, Scyliorhinidae, Sphyrnidae, Squatinidae, Torpedinidae and Triakidae. In addition, the museum co-manages the International Shark Attack File, a database of documented shark attacks at sea. This is not open to the public, but rather a source for scientists and researchers.

Holdings of freshwater fishes are greatest from the southeastern United States, particularly Florida. In addition, an effort has been made to obtain as complete a taxonomic and geographic coverage of freshwater species as possible from throughout North America. As a result, over 90 percent of the freshwater fish species from the United States and Canada are represented in the collection. Best represented are members of the Catostomidae, Centrarchidae, Cyprinidae, Elassomatidae, Fundulidae, Ictaluridae, Lepisosteidae, Percidae, Petromyzontidae and Poeciliidae. Freshwater fishes from Bolivia, Venezuela, Colombia, Hispaniola, Guatemala, Panama and Costa Rica are currently represented in moderate to large numbers in the collection. The Florida Museum of Natural History's Hispaniolan holdings are unsurpassed and the Venezuelan holdings are growing continuously. A wide spectrum of characoid, gymnotidae and siluridae families, cichlids, and poeciliids are especially well represented.

=== Malacology ===
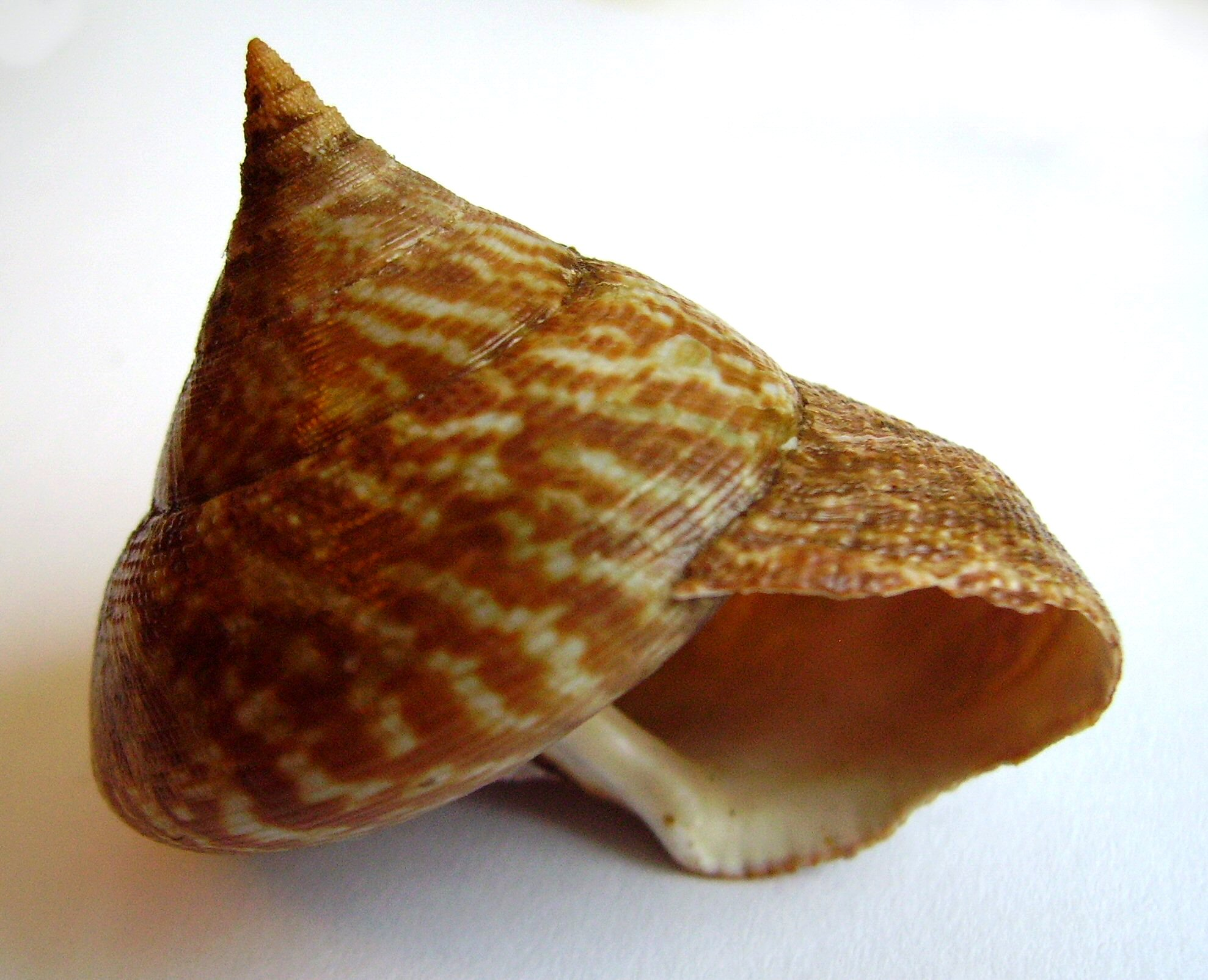
The shell of the tiger top snail, Calliostoma tigris, from New Zealand.

The mollusk collection was initiated through the efforts of T. van Hyning, the first director of the museum, and was small and composed mostly of local taxa until 1965. In 1966, the department became a distinct curatorial unit with the hiring of Fred G. Thompson as the first Curator of Malacology. In 1973, the mollusk collection consisted of 22,174 cataloged lots and ranked 19th in the US. The collection has grown rapidly since, through numerous field surveys and acquisition of relinquished collections. Since 2000, the malacology department has also hosted a growing collection of non-molluscan marine invertebrates. As of 2025, the department had nearly 580,000 specimen-lots of close to 3 million specimens, covering 30,000 species. Over 300,000 lots are now databased and accessible online. The collection is among the five largest in the US, and one of the most rapidly growing. It is the second largest mollusk collection in the world in online accessibility.

The collection is especially strong in regional taxa. Malacology has one of the largest collections of terrestrial and freshwater mollusks from the southeastern US. Overall, marine mollusks comprise 50% of cataloged holdings; freshwater species make up 13% and terrestrial taxa 37%. Gastropods comprise 79% of the collection and bivalves 20%, while all other mollusk classes combined make up <1% of the collection. Three quarters of the collection is from the Western Hemisphere, while 18% is from tropical Australasia and surrounding Pacific and Indian Ocean islands. The mollusk collection has unique strengths in land, freshwater and marine mollusks. The museum has the largest land snail collection in the world from Hispaniola, Mexico-Central America, Pakistan and Thailand, and also has especially large holdings from the southeastern United States, West Indies, Andean South America, Madagascar, Southeast Asia, and Oceania. Freshwater mollusk collections are strong for the southeastern United States, Mexico, Central America, Andean South America, and the Philippines. Large subtropical and tropical West Atlantic and Indo-West Pacific holdings characterize the marine collection, and tropical marine collections are undergoing rapid growth. These strengths reflect a former regional focus of the museum and research focus of the curators: on terrestrial and freshwater mollusks of Middle America and Southeast Asia, and on tropical marine mollusks, respectively.

=== Botany and the Florida Herbarium ===
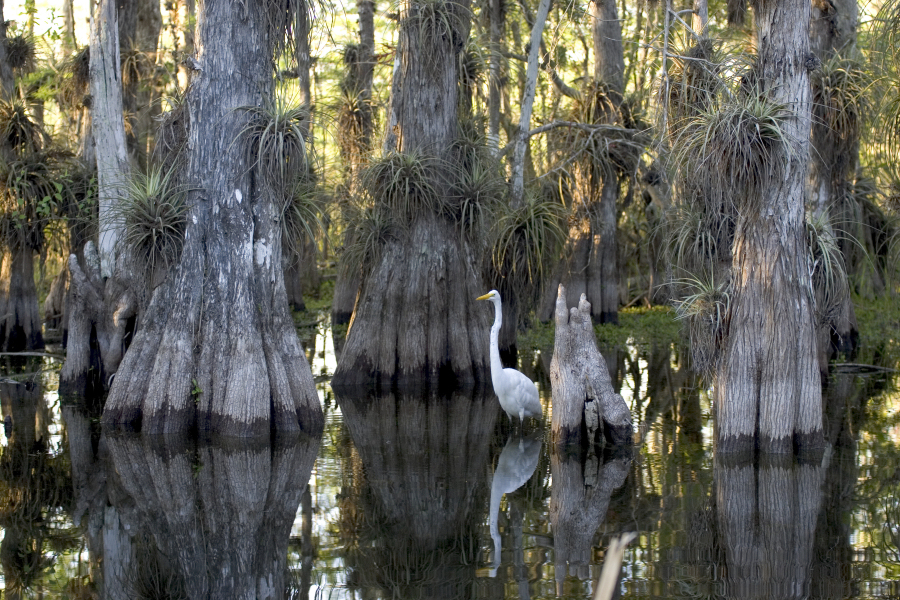
Everglades National Park in Southern Florida

The Herbarium was founded in 1891 as part of Florida Agricultural College, hence the collection's acronym is FLAS. The botany collection is an excellent representation of the vascular flora of Florida and the southeastern United States coastal plain, including abundant material from the 19th century. The museum's while botanical collection holdings amount to around half a million specimens. As of 2026, over 288,000 of these can be browsed online.

The bryophyte and lichen collections comprise about 140,000 specimens and encompass Florida and tropical areas, especially Costa Rica, Venezuela and Brazil. The Fungal Herbarium exhibits Florida fungi, especially agarics and polypores, as well as plants infected by fungi and isolates of microfungi on dried agar plates; it currently has more than 58,000 specimens. The wood collection is worldwide with a tropical emphasis, and has approximately 15,700 wood samples and over 1,000 microscope slides. The vascular plant collection includes approximately 280,000 sheets, approximately 93,000 of which can be viewed online. The vascular collection represents Florida, the southeastern United States' coast, Haiti and Central America.

Noteworthy additions include the A. A. Cuthbert Herbarium of approximately 5,000 specimens; 4,711 plant holdings from the Florida State Museum, including the Herbarium of S. C. Hood; several thousand more S. C. Hood collections; 15,770 specimens of lichens, liverworts and mosses collected by Severin Rapp; wood blocks and vouchers of American wood and economic trees from the New York State School of Forestry; George E. Ritchey specimens from the U. S. Plant Introduction Garden; Edward and Robert P. St. John Florida ferns; innumerable West and Arnold collections and those received through inter-institutional exchange. The herbarium also benefited from the prominent studies of H. Harold Hume (Zephyranthes, Ilex, and Camellia) and William A. Murrill (Crataegus and fungi) and, in 1989, Angus K. Gholson, Jr. donated his entire herbarium (15,000 specimens), library and related equipment and supplied. This is a large collection, rich in its representation of the flora of the Florida Panhandle.

=== Herpetology ===
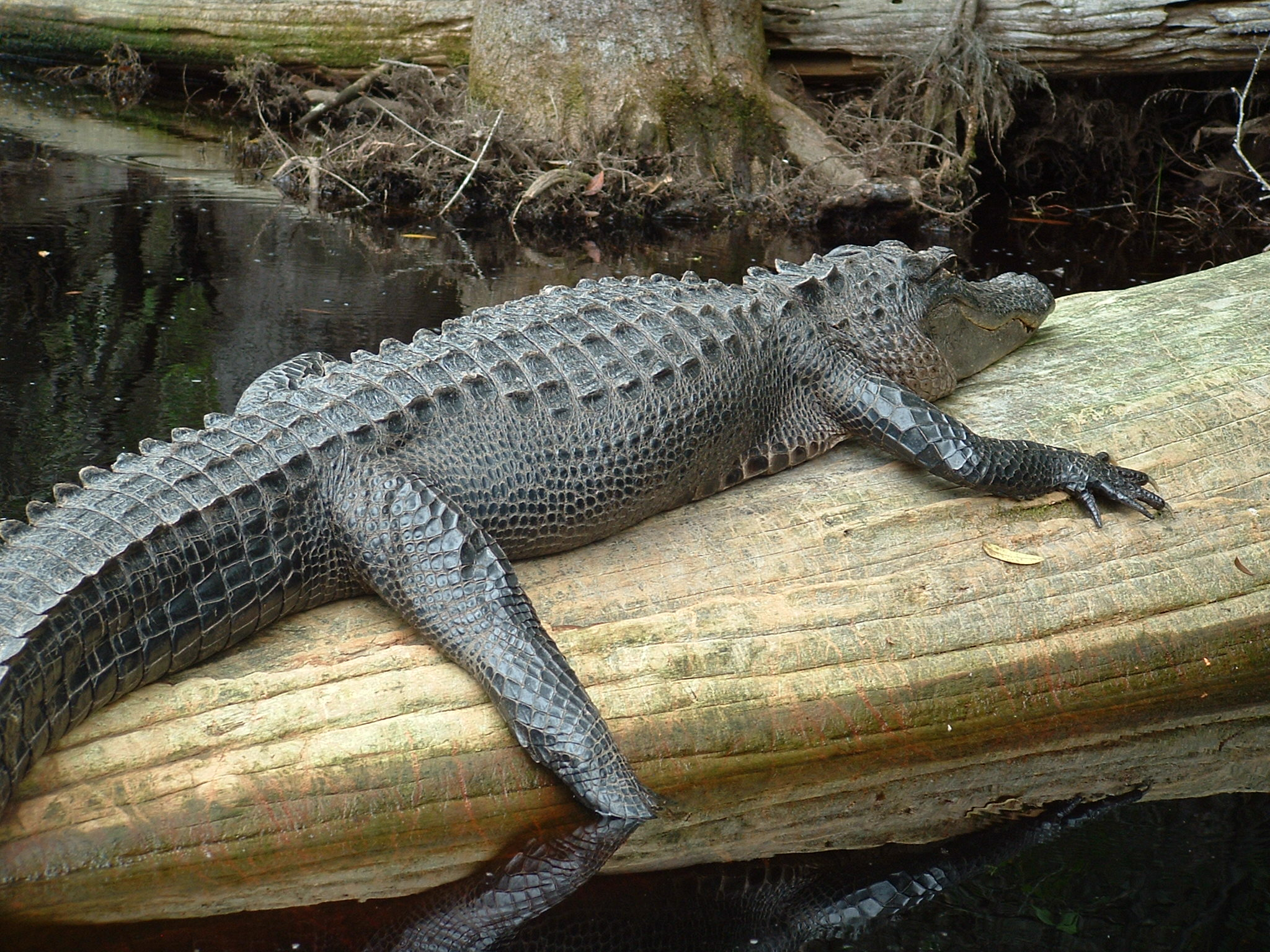
American alligator

With approximately 202,000 specimens, the herpetology collection is one of the top 19 largest in the US. Its skeletal collection had, as of 2017, more than 12,000 specimens, including skeletons, prepared skins and dry specimens, and is also one of the largest in the US. An average of 3,800 specimens a year are catalogued. The collection contains 60 holotypes and 919 paratypes representing 176 taxa. Additional taxa are in the process of being described. Most of its specimens can be viewed online.

Though worldwide in scope, the collection contains approximately 1,800 species from the Neotropics, 670 from Asia, 300 from the Nearctic, 500 from Africa, 70 from the Palearctic, and 150 from Australia and Oceania. Large holdings of land tortoises and varanid lizards resulted from Walter Auffenberg's research, and his work on the herpetology of Pakistan produced the world's largest Pakistan collection. Large numbers of sea turtles came from Archie Carr and his students. Wayne King's surveys of Bolivia, Paraguay, Brazil, Honduras, Nicaragua, and Guyana, assembled the largest collection of Latin American crocodilians. Sizable collections of Kinosternid turtles were donated by John Iverson, softshells by Peter Meylan, and Panama amphibians and reptiles by Howard W. Campbell. Samuel R. Telford, Jr., provided extensive collections from Japan, Myanmar, Panama, Venezuela, Tanzania, and Pakistan, and smaller numbers from the DRC, Thailand and the Philippines. Recorded vocalizations of 46 species of amphibians and 20 species of reptiles are catalogued in the museum's Bioacoustic Archives.

=== Ornithology ===
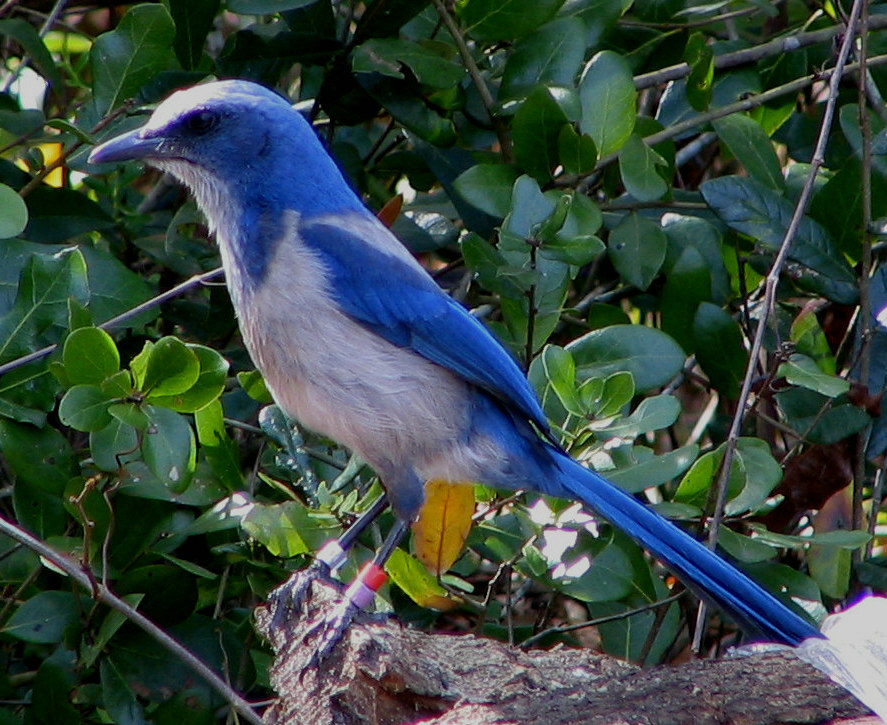
The Florida scrub jay is found only in Florida.

The ornithology collection began when Charles Doe joined the Museum in the early 1930s and donated his life's work, the Doe Egg Collection, to the museum. Oliver Austin became curator in 1957, and began to grow the physical collection; JW Hardy, who became curator in 1973, started the sound library; David Steadman, who became curator in 1995, expanded the skin and skeleton collection. The current curator, as of 2026, is Dr. Glaucia Del-Rio.

The recent bird skeleton collection had, as of 2017, 28,000 specimens, representing about 3,000 species. It contains specimens from 47 U.S. states and 103 countries, and represents 23 orders, 128 families, and 950 genera. It is the fifth largest collection in the world in number of specimens and species. The collection had a large growth spurt in 1992, when it received 12,500 recent bird skeletons assembled by Prof. Pierce Brodkorb of the University of Florida's Department of Zoology. The skeleton collection grew by 140% between 2002 and 2007.

The largest collections by state are:

| Florida 11,169 | California 638 | Maine 227 | Massachusetts 218 | Georgia 213 |
| Alaska 201 | New York 154 | Texas 142 | Arizona 140 | Virginia 124 |

The top ten countries collected from are:

| US 13,282 | Mexico 745 | Netherlands 397 | Costa Rica 320 | Kenya 312 |
| Panama 252 | Zimbabwe 217 | Suriname 213 | Canada 198 | Australia 124 |

As of 2017, the bird skin collection contains approximately 25,000 specimens, representing at least 2,300 species. It contains specimens from 45 U.S. states and 77 countries, and represents 27 orders, 129 families, and 850 genera. These are mostly study skins but, in recent years, the division has prepared a large proportion of new specimens as flat skins or spread wings with associated skeletons. In 1992, the division also received a collection of approximately 3,000 skins. The skin collection grew by 23% between 2002 and 2007. Rarities include skins of ivory-billed woodpeckers and extinct dusky seaside sparrows, passenger pigeons, and Carolina parakeets.

As of 2017, the egg collection consisted of 13,000 sets representing 733 species. It is the 11th largest in North America in number of sets and 15th largest in number of species. It represents approximately 90% of the species and subspecies of North American birds. The egg collection has grown by 1% in the last five years. It is cataloged in a card file that includes original collectors' data slips or page references to the collector's field notes. Especially well represented are sets from New England and Florida. The collection is rich in sets of raptor eggs, including bald eagles, ospreys, broad-winged hawks, red-shouldered hawks, crested caracaras, American kestrels, the Florida races of seaside sparrows and clapper rails. Rarities include sets of passenger pigeon, Carolina parakeet, and Bachman's warbler eggs.

The bird sound collection within the Bioacoustic Archives, has 27,500 recordings representing about 3,000 species. It is the fourth largest in the world in number of species. In the Western Hemisphere, it is the second largest in number of species and third largest in number of recordings. The sound collection is completely cataloged in an electronic database, and the sound recordings themselves were digitized over a five-year period, beginning in 2009, with help from $446,000 National Science Foundation grant. The sound recordings are available online.

Geographical strengths include North America, especially Florida, and the Neotropics, with smaller but notable numbers of recordings from Africa, Australia, and Southeast Asia. Some taxonomic groups especially well represented are tinamous, trogons, woodpeckers, antbirds, New World flycatchers, wrens, New World wood warblers, and corvids.

=== Vertebrate Paleontology ===
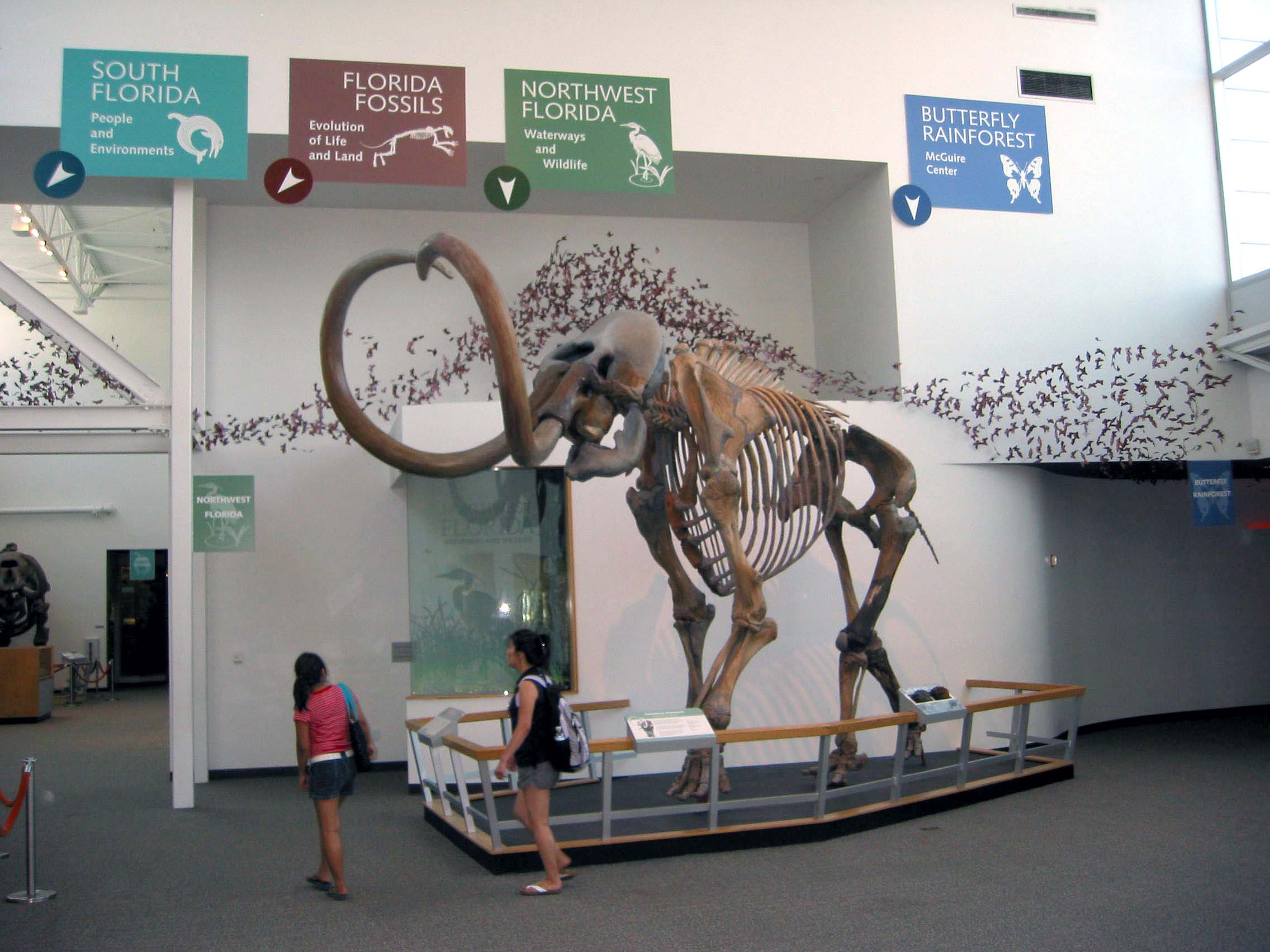
A Columbian mammoth in the Main Gallery of the Florida Museum of Natural History.

The Vertebrate Paleontology department's five separate vertebrate fossil collections feature rich samples of all vertebrate classes, and are mainly from the Cenozoic Era. The combined collections include about 1,500,000 specimens and holotypes number about 275.

The primary collection is "specimens recovered by Florida Museum staff, graduate students, and volunteers and those donated to the museum" and is referred to as the UF/VP collection.

The other collections are the former Florida Geological Survey Collection (UF/FGS), the UF Department of Zoology Fossil Bird Collection (UF/PB) and parts of the Timberlane Research Organization collection (UF/TRO). The fifth collection (UF/IGM) comprises specimens collected in Colombia by the Museum, the Instituto Nacional de Investigaciones Geologico-Mineras and the Smithsonian Tropical Research Institute.

The FLMNH collections provide the most complete basis available for study of Cenozoic vertebrate paleontology in the southeastern United States and the Caribbean Basin. The museum's Vertebrate Paleontology division utilizes 3-D printing technology to advance research in paleontology. This technology is used for museum outreach and to develop lesson plans in K-12 curriculums.

==== History ====
Prior to 1953, the museum's VP collection consisted of only a few hundred specimens, mostly acquired through public donation, and of little scientific value. Beginning in 1953, serious fossil prospecting began at the University of Florida, initially led by Robert S. Bader and Walter A. Auffenberg, both then members of the Department of Biology. Clayton Ray became the museum's first official curator of vertebrate paleontology in 1959. He left in 1963 to take a position at the Smithsonian. Recognizing the importance of vertebrate paleontology in Florida, in 1964, museum director J. C. Dickinson hired two vertebrate paleontology curators, S. David Webb and Thomas H. Patton. Together, they moved the museum's research program to the forefront of the field, symbolized by their hosting the annual meeting of the Society of Vertebrate Paleontology in Gainesville, in the fall of 1964. This was the first time this meeting had been held in the Southeastern United States. Patton left in the mid-1970s and was replaced in 1977 by Bruce J. MacFadden. Webb retired in 2003, and Jonathan I. Bloch was hired to fill the vacant curator position. Another important feat was the creation of the Florida Paleontological Society and the forming of a strong bond between the professional paleontologists at the museum and the amateur fossil collectors throughout the state of Florida. Although technically curators in other museum divisions, Walter Auffenberg (Herpetology) and Charles A. Woods (Mammalogy) both had research interests that included paleontology and helped build the collection.

The first fossil preparator was Howard H. Converse, who worked at the museum from the late 1960s through the mid-1980s. He was followed by Russell McCarty, who retired in 2006, and Jane Mason, who left in 2009. Jason Bourque is the current vertebrate paleontology preparator and studies fossil and living turtles. Gary S. Morgan was collections manager from 1981 through 1993, and oversaw the curation of massive numbers of specimens from the Love Bone Bed, Thomas Farm, Leisey Shell Pit, Bone Valley, Haiti, and elsewhere. He was replaced by Marc Frank (1994–1998) and Richard C. Hulbert (2000–present).

Since 1964, VP curators have mentored many dozens of graduate students, produced numerous books, monographs, and research papers, and directed field operations in Florida, the Caribbean, Central and South America, and the western U.S.

==== University of Florida (UF/VP) Collection ====
As of 2026, the UF/VP collection contains about 502,000 specimens assigned to over 234,000 unique catalogue numbers and covering 150 holotypes. The UF collection has experienced rapid, sometimes explosive, growth since the 1950s and now ranks in the top five nationally in terms of total catalogued specimens. Consistent with the museum's mission as the official repository for Florida's natural history specimens, about 90% of this collection comes from about 1,000 separate localities throughout Florida. A particular strength of the UF/VP collection is the extraordinary array of land-animals from the past 25 million years in Florida, forming the best record documenting the evolution of ancient vertebrate life in eastern North America over this interval. Other major strengths of this collection include extensive holdings from Haiti, the Dominican Republic, the Cayman Islands, Jamaica, and other Caribbean islands, fossils from Central and South America (especially Bolivia, Honduras, and Panama), and specimens from the late Eocene to Oligocene "Badlands" of western Nebraska. Ongoing field work, begun by curator Jonathan Bloch in 2004, is producing a collection of Paleocene and early Eocene vertebrates from basins in Wyoming and Montana.

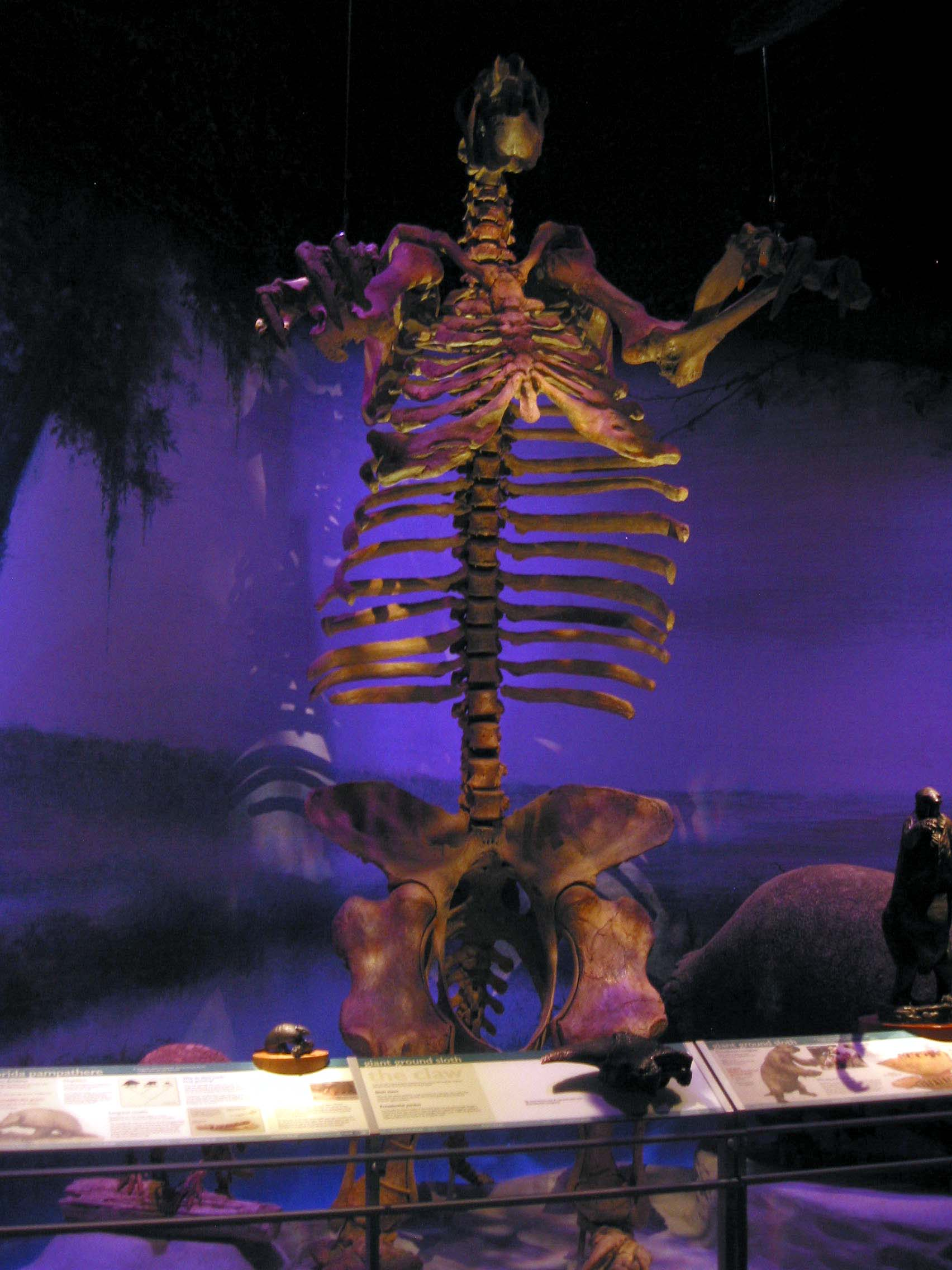
A giant ground sloth skeleton from the Florida Fossil Hall.

==== Florida Geological Survey (FGS) Collection ====
The FGS fossil vertebrate collection was started in the 1910s and originally housed in Tallahassee. Under the direction of E. H. Sellards, Herman Gunter, and S. J. Olsen, the FGS collection was the primary source of fossil vertebrate descriptions from Florida until the early 1960s. World-renowned paleontologists, such as George G. Simpson, Edwin H. Colbert, and Henry F. Osborn, wrote scientific papers about specimens in the FGS collection, in addition to Sellards and Olsen. In 1976, the entire FGS fossil vertebrate collection was transferred to the Florida Museum of Natural History, with support from a National Science Foundation grant. The UF/FGS collection is composed of about 22,000 specimens assigned to about 10,000 catalogue numbers, almost all of which were collected in Florida. The majority of specimens in the UF/FGS collection are mammals, followed by reptiles and amphibians, and a relatively small number of birds and fish. Although there are some sites that are unique to the UF/FGS collection, many of the sites overlap with holdings in the main UF and UF/PB collections. The major strengths of the UF/FGS collection are historically important samples from the early Miocene Thomas Farm locality, the middle Miocene and early Pliocene deposits of the Bone Valley Region in Polk County, and the late Pleistocene Vero Canal locality, Indian River County.

==== Pierce Brodkorb (PB) Collection ====
The Pierce Brodkorb Collection (UF/PB), officially known as the UF Department of Zoology Fossil Bird Collection, was amassed by Professor Brodkorb of the University of Florida over his career as one of the world's foremost experts on fossil birds. His heirs donated his extensive collections of modern bird skeletons and fossil birds to the Florida Museum of Natural History in 1992. The modern skeletons are housed by the museum's Ornithology collection. Brodkorb's fossil bird collection was curated and computer catalogued with support from the National Science Foundation. The UF/PB collection is composed of about 9,900 catalogued specimens and includes 42 holotypes. About 77% of the UF/PB specimens were collected in Florida, and they range in age from early Miocene to late Pleistocene. Other large holdings are Pleistocene birds from Bermuda and the Bahamas.

=== Archaeology & Ethnography ===
The Archaeology & Ethnography department comprises multiple programs, the largest of which are environmental archaeology, Florida archaeology and Caribbean archaeology, as well as the ceramics lab.

==== Environmental Archaeology ====
The Environmental Archaeology Program (EAP) of the Florida Museum was established by Dr. Elizabeth Wing in the early 1960s as the Zooarchaeology collection, and was curated by her until her retirement in 2001. In 1990, the Zooarchaeology program was transferred to the Florida Museum and, in 1997, was renamed to the Environmental Archaeology Program. The EAP collections include over 13,000 specimens of archaeological animal, plant, and soil materials that represent 14,000 years of human-environmental relationships in the early circum-Caribbean Americas, including the southeastern US, Central America, the Caribbean, and northern South America. As of 2026, approximately 11,600 specimens can be viewed online The collections are strongest in zoological specimens (modern comparative and zooarchaeological) but, since the 1990s, have grown to include significant holdings of archaeobotanical, botanical, archaeopedological and modern soils holdings.

Environmental archaeology, a subdiscipline of anthropology, reconstructs the long relationship between people and environments using biotic (animal and plant) and abiotic (geological) remains from archaeological sites. EAP researchers focus on integrated analyses that explore every aspect of that relationship, from the environmental conditions during human occupation, to human use of and impact on natural resources, to human perceptions and symbolic interpretations of aspects of the plants, animals, and landscapes of their environments.

==== Caribbean Archaeology ====
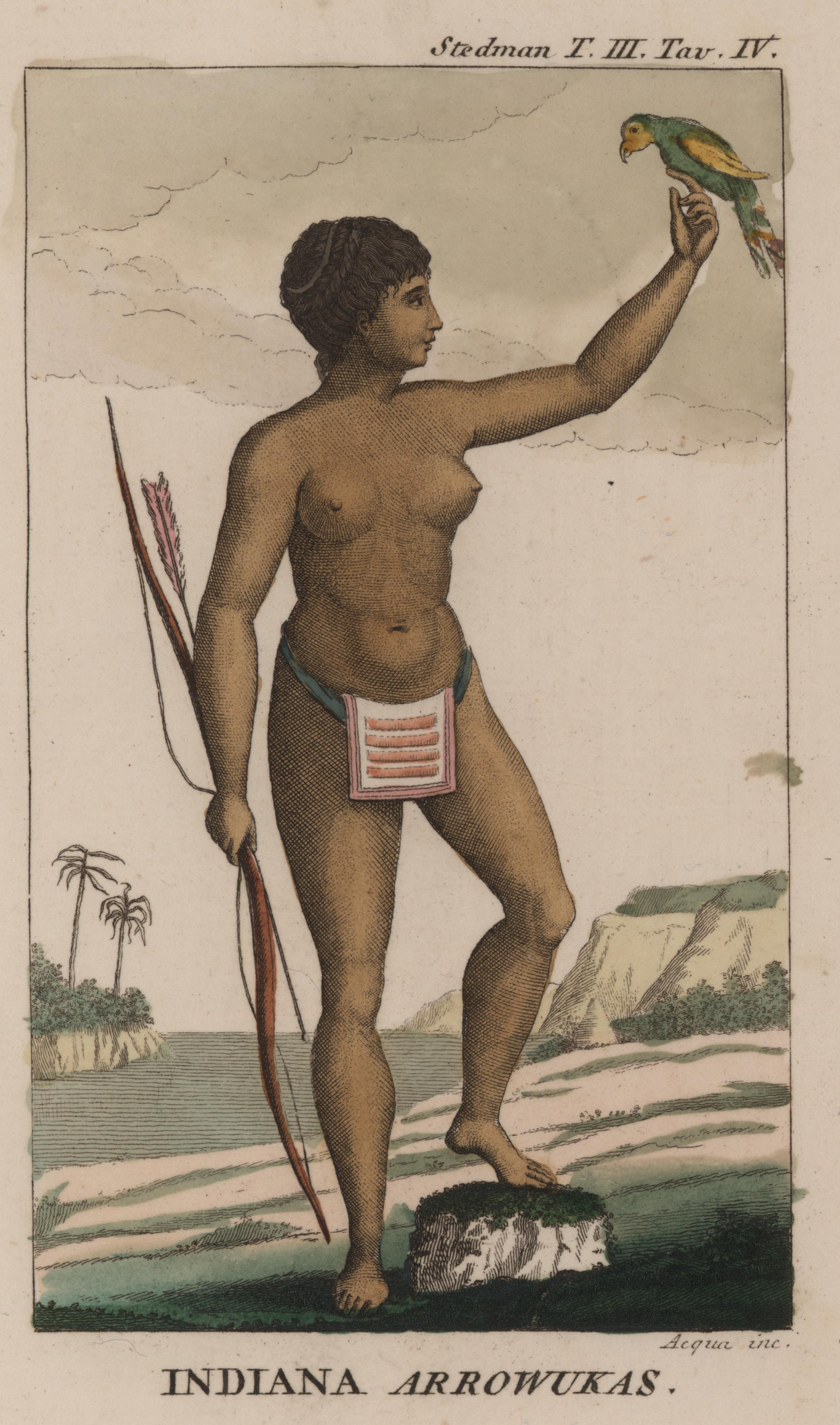
Arowak woman (John Gabriel Stedman)

The Caribbean Archaeology Program Collection was founded in 1960 by Dr. Ripley P. Bullen. The program is based around one of the largest systematic collections of pre-Columbian artifacts in North America. Despite its relatively small size compared to other collections at the museum, this collection contains systematic artifacts from sites on the islands of Antigua, Aruba, Bahamas, Barbados, Curaçao, Dominican Republic, Grenada, Guadeloupe, Guyana, Haiti, Jamaica, Marie-Galante, Martinique, Puerto Rico, St. Lucia, St. Martin, St. Vincent and the Grenadines, Suriname, Tobago, Trinidad, Turks and Caicos, U.S. Virgin Islands, and Venezuela. Each collection has accompanying documentation.

The Bullen collection was re-inventoried and reorganized in the early 2000s. During this reorganization, type collections, composed of all the artifacts illustrated in Bullen's publications, were also created. These collection catalogs, which are based on the tables published in the Bullens' reports, are available for all of the islands and sites represented in the collection. Presently, a map of the West Indies and a list of the islands and the sites represented in the collection are available to the public.

The collection includes artifacts recovered during excavations directed by Dr. Charles A. Hoffman, Jr. on the islands of Antigua and St. Kitts; a study collection derived from the excavations directed by Dr. Kathleen A. Deagan from the sites of En Bas Saline and Puerto Réal, Haiti; a collection of important artifacts that were surface collected from sites in Grenada, donated by Leon Wilder; and a number of artifacts recovered from sites in Jamaica and Grenada, donated by Mr. Geoffrey Senior.

Survey and excavation projects are an integral part of the Caribbean Archaeology Program. Since 1987, research teams from the museum have undertaken surveys and excavations in Antigua, the Bahamas, Grand Cayman, Grenada, Haiti, Jamaica, and the Turks and Caicos Islands.

==== Ceramic Technology Laboratory ====
The Ceramic Technology Laboratory was established in 1977 under the direction of Dr. Prudence Rice, then UF professor of anthropology. The Laboratory's mission is to "generate precise data to address research questions regarding chronology, provenance or manufacturing origins, processes of production, patterns of vessel use, culture change, and the development of sociopolitical and economic complexity in pre-Columbian Florida, the Southeastern US, and the Caribbean Basin." Pottery analysis plays an integral role in archaeological research at the museum, as it constitutes the predominant material remaining at most archaeological sites investigated by museum curators. In addition, pottery constitutes a significant proportion of the Anthropology collections.

The department is committed to the continuance of this research program as the capacity for in-house specialized analysis of pottery enhances the competitiveness for research grants. The Ceramic Technology Laboratory is equipped for basic paste characterization studies: binocular microscope for gross identification of temper or paste constituents; a petrographic microscope for precise mineral identification in thin section; an electric furnace used for refiring experiments and for comparative investigation of clay samples collected from the vicinity of archaeological sites.

The CTL has three main collections. The pottery type collection includes pre-Columbian and historic period Indigenous pottery from Florida and the Southeastern US.The Florida materials represent type specimens assembled by Ripley Bullen, John Goggin, and Gordon Willey, pioneers of Florida archaeology. The pottery type collections serve as a primary comparative resource for museum scientists, graduate students, and visiting researchers. The comparative clay sample collection includes, as of 2017, over 350 samples of clay from across the collection, and is used to document geographic variability in clay mineralogy and chemistry. The thin section library contains over 2000 thin pottery sections and 225 clay thin sections, mostly collected from Florida.

==== Florida Archaeology ====
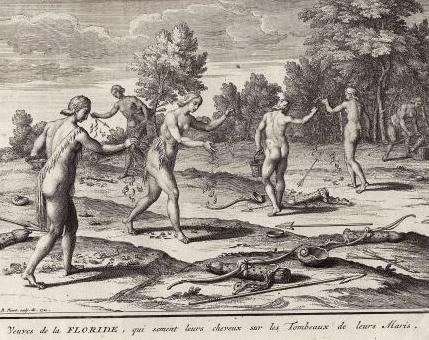
Bernard Picart copper plate engraving of Florida Indians, c. 1721 "Cérémonies et Coutumes Religieuses de tous les Peuples du Monde"

The Florida Archaeology Collection was one of the first collections established at the museum, following Bullen's starting at the museum. At this time, records and collections from the Florida Park Service’s archaeology division were transferred to the museum. When William Sears joined in 1955, he directed surveys across the state, the records of which are held by the collection. In the 70s and 80s, archaeological collections and archival materials from UF's Department of Anthropology were transferred to the museum and, in 1984, Charles Fairbanks' notes and collections were transferred to the museum. At the same time, the records and collections from the King’s Bay archaeological project in southeastern Georgia also moved to the museum. Since then, further surveys and excavations carried out across the state have added to the collection.

The collection includes artifacts spanning 12,000 years of human history in the Southeast and is curated as a tangible record of the people who have made Florida their home. The Florida Archaeology Collections come from Central and North Florida and the Panhandle regions. All counties, including and north of Sarasota, De Soto, Hardee, Polk, Osceola, and Indian River counties are included in this collection. Exceptions to this rule are sites situated within Colonial St. Augustine and historical sites with no pre-Columbian material present, as collections from these locales are included in the Historical Archaeology Collections. Counties to the south are part of the South Florida Archaeology Collections. While the focus of this collection is on Florida, some materials from Georgia and other localities are included.

The Excavated Collections include all archaeological materials that have been excavated using systematic recovery techniques, along with associated provenance data. Documentation, such as field notes, maps, and photographs, are often available with the collection. Below is a select list of sites in the Florida Archeology Collections.

===== Abraham's Old Town =====
Abraham's Old Town is a multicomponent site in Sumter County. It has been identified as Pilaklikaha, a town inhabited by Black Seminoles during the early 19th century. The site has evidence of ceramic period occupation (Pasco and Sand-Tempered Plain) and possibly a preceramic component. The collection includes lithics, ceramics (both European and Seminole), glass beads, trade pipe fragments, bottle glass, brick, cut nails, and other metal fragments recovered during excavations from 1998 to 2001.

===== Aucilla River Prehistory Project =====
The collection contains prehistoric lithic, bone and mammoth ivory tools, ceramics, historic materials, plant remains, and Pleistocene and Holocene fossils from assorted sites along the Aucilla River. Notable items in this collection include the fossilized bones of Pleistocene animals exhibiting butcher and cut marks, numerous stone Paleoindian projectile points, and carved ivory shafts.

===== Bolen Bluff =====
Bolen Bluff is a multicomponent site located south of Paynes Prairie. The site was excavated by Ripley Bullen in 1949. Large portions of the site were destroyed and used for fill during highway construction. The collections include numerous stone points and tools, including Suwannee, Bolen, Arredondo, and Pinellas points, as well as stone adzes, hoes, drills, and scrapers. Pottery types span the entire range of ceramic periods in the area: Orange, Transitional, Deptford, Weeden Island, St. Johns, and Alachua.

===== de Soto Survey =====
The de Soto archaeological survey project was conducted from 1986–1991 and aimed to locate and identify early Spanish-Indian contact period sites in north Florida. The six surveys identified or revisited over 750 archaeological sites in 15 counties. Some of the major sites identified and excavated were the location of the Spanish mission at Fig Springs, the Spanish mission of Santa Fe, and the Indian Pond site.

===== McKeithen Site =====
The McKeithen Site is a Weeden Island site in Columbia County, excavated during the late 1970s. The site is composed of a village area and three mounds. The collections from the site include a variety of Weeden Island ceramics, both whole and almost whole vessels collected from different areas of the site. The collection also includes a variety of stone points and tools, grinding stones, mica, and some faunal and floral remains.

===== Richardson Site =====
The Richardson Site is a Potano Indian village near Orange Lake that dates from the late pre-Columbian and early Spanish mission period. The site provides valuable information on Potano houses and early Spanish missionization. Collections include a large collection of Alachua pottery, lithics, glass beads, wrought nails, and faunal material. It may be the site of the town of Potano visited by the Hernando de Soto expedition, and of the early 17th century mission of San Buenaventura de Potano.

===== Spanish Mission collections =====
The Spanish mission sites collection contains a large number of items from the mission sites at Baptizing Spring, Fox Pond, Santa Fe, Fig Springs, Indian Pond, Scott Miller, San Juan, Beatty, Blue Bead, Baldree, and the sites on Amelia Island. There are also numerous other Spanish mission period sites associated with missions or haciendas, including Moon Lake, Richardson, Zetrouer, Carlisle, and Peacock Lake.

===== Tatham Mound =====
Tatham Mound is a Safety Harbor culture mound located near the Withlacoochee River in Citrus County. The site was also in use at the time of de Soto, as evidenced by numerous Spanish artifacts dating to mid-16th century. The collections include Safety Harbor ceramic vessels, Pinellas points and other lithic tools, and many shell artifacts, such as gorgets, celts, dippers, and beads. Spanish artifacts include metal beads and pendants, Nueva Cadiz and other glass beads, and metal artifacts, such as chisels, spikes, and armor fragments.

===== Donated private collections =====
Private collections donated by individuals and families represent an important aspect of the Florida Archaeology collections. These collections include artifacts from all over Florida and a limited amount of material from other areas of North America. Many of these collections are from well-known sites and are valuable sources of exhibit quality artifacts and research collections. These collections range in size, from small surface collections from single sites to collections that cover large portions of the state and include thousands of artifacts. A representative sample of donated private collections curated at the museum includes the following collections, organized by family name.

| Becker | Burkhardt | Haufler | Hendrix | McMullen (Osceola, Polk, Volusia Counties) |
| Means | Ohmes | Pearsall | Simpson | McDonald (Brevard County) |

===== Bullen Projectile Point Typology Collection =====
The Ripley Bullen Projectile Point Type Collection is the original assortment of artifacts collected by archeologist Ripley P. Bullen and used to create the first formal point typology for Florida, presented in 1967. Bullen's typology was revised in 1975 and published as A Guide to the Identification of Florida Projectile Points. This collection of 620 specimens is curated as an original reference collection for visiting researchers and the general public.

===== Osteological collections =====
Human osteological collections curated at the Florida Museum of Natural History include skeletal remains from pre-Columbian and historic archaeological sites across Florida, Georgia, and several localities in the Caribbean. These were collected before NAGPRA was enacted. As of 2022, these collections are under a research moratorium.

==== Historical archaeology ====
The historical archaeology collection of the Florida Museum of Natural History consists of more than 2 million excavated specimens from more than 100 sites throughout Florida and Latin America. They include the largest known systematic collection of Spanish colonial archaeological specimens in the country, representing sites of domestic, military, religious, and commercial sites dating from 1492 through the 19th century. The collection also incorporates archaeological specimens from a variety of non-Spanish 18th- and 19th-century sites, including homesteads, plantations, trading posts, forts, and towns.

In addition to systematic collections resulting from excavation, the Historical Archaeology Department also maintains extensive collections of type specimens, comparative specimens and published specimens for historical archaeology. The materials span the period of 1493–1900, and are used extensively as a reference collection, comparative collection, and teaching collection.

===== The St. Augustine Collections =====
The materials from St. Augustine, Florida (1565–present) were generated by systematic archaeological excavations from a forty-year period, from 1959 to 1999, on 33 Spanish colonial, British colonial, African American, American Indian, and post-colonial sites in St. Augustine, Florida. They include more than 1 million items of glass, metals, stone, shell, and bone. They are curated jointly by the University of Florida, the Florida Division of Historical Resources, and the City of St. Augustine at the museum.

===== The Latin American Collections =====
This collection includes some of the earliest historical archaeology collections in the region. The foundation was John Goggin's ambitious program of historical archaeology during the 1940s and 1950s, which generated a large collection of materials from sites throughout the Caribbean and Central America.

His collaborations with researchers, such as Emile Boyrie of the Dominican Republic, José Cruxent of Venezuela, and Irving Rouse of Yale, additionally resulted in the exchange of smaller comparative collections from throughout the region. Excavations in Haiti conducted by Charles Fairbanks and Kathleen Deagan between 1979 and 1988 also generated two large Historic-era collections that are curated at the Florida Museum of Natural History on behalf of the Haitian government.

===== The Historical Florida Collections =====
In addition to the collections from St. Augustine and Latin America, the Historical Archeology collections also include materials excavated from a variety of towns, missions, plantations, and forts in Florida and the southeastern United States.
