= Barbantus elongatus =

Conservation status
- Data Deficient (IUCN 3.1)

Scientific classification
- Kingdom: Animalia
- Phylum: Chordata
- Class: Actinopterygii
- Order: Alepocephaliformes
- Family: Platytroctidae
- Genus: Barbantus
- Species: B. elongatus

Binomial name
- Barbantus elongatus Krefft, 1970

Synonyms
- Pectinantus elongatus (Krefft, 1970)

Species of fish

Barbantus elongatus is a species of deepwater marine ray-finned fish belonging to the family Platytroctidae, the tube shoulders. This species was first formally described in 1970 by the German ichthyologist Gerhard Krefft with its type locality given as the Central Atlantic at 3°00'S, 20°16'W from a depth of around 2,000 m (6,600 ft). This bathypelagic species is known from seven specimens which have been collected from depths between 1,800 and 2,000 m (5,900 and 6,600 ft) along the Mid-Atlantic Ridge in the waters near Saint Helena, Ascension Island, Tristan da Cunha and in the Brazilian EEZ from 32°W and between 8°N and 16°S. This species has a maximum published standard length of 17.8 cm (7.0 in).
