= Searsia =

Searsia may refer to:

- Searsia (fish), a genus of fish in the family Platytroctidae
- Searsia (plant), a genus of plants in the family Anacardiaceae
