= Matsuichthys =

Scientific classification
- Kingdom: Animalia
- Phylum: Chordata
- Class: Actinopterygii
- Order: Alepocephaliformes
- Family: Platytroctidae
- Genus: Matsuichthys; Sazonov, 1992
- Species: M. aequipinnis

Binomial name
- Matsuichthys aequipinnis (Matsui & Rosenblatt, 1987)

Genus of ray-finned fishes

Matsuichthys aequipinnis is a species of tubeshoulder found only in the Sulu Sea. This species grows to a length of 11.9 centimetres (4.7 in) SL.
