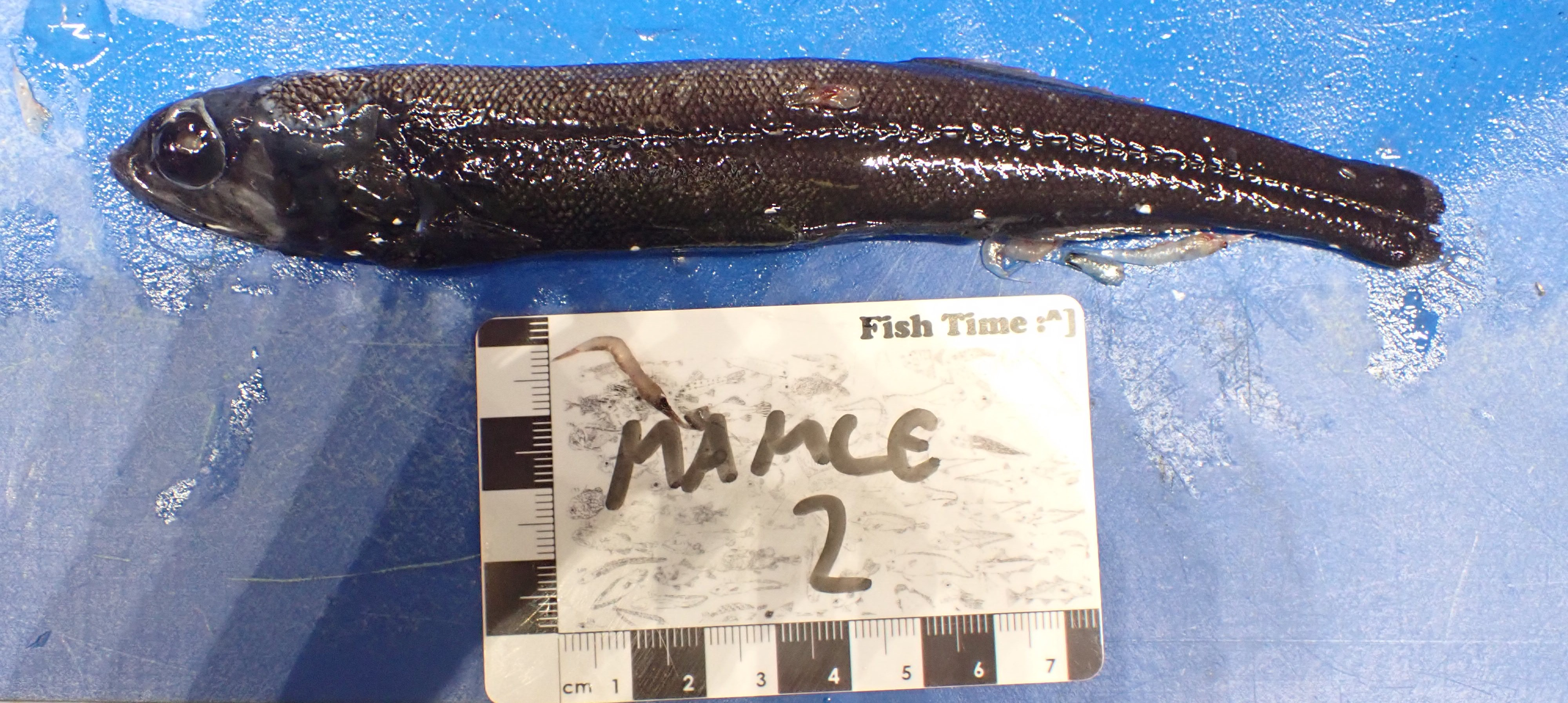

Conservation status
- Least Concern (IUCN 3.1)

Scientific classification
- Kingdom: Animalia
- Phylum: Chordata
- Class: Actinopterygii
- Order: Alepocephaliformes
- Family: Platytroctidae
- Genus: Sagamichthys
- Species: S. schnakenbecki

Binomial name
- Sagamichthys schnakenbecki (Krefft, 1953)

Synonyms
- Holtbyrnia schankenbecki Krefft, 1953; Holtbyrnia schnakenbecki Krefft, 1953; Searsia schnakenbecki Krefft, 1953

= Schnakenbeck's searsid =

Species of fish

Schnakenbeck's searsid (Sagamichthys schnakenbecki) is a species of fish in the family Platytroctidae (tubeshoulders).

It was named by Gerhard Krefft (1912–1993), who named it for his supervisor Werner Schnakenbeck.

== Description ==
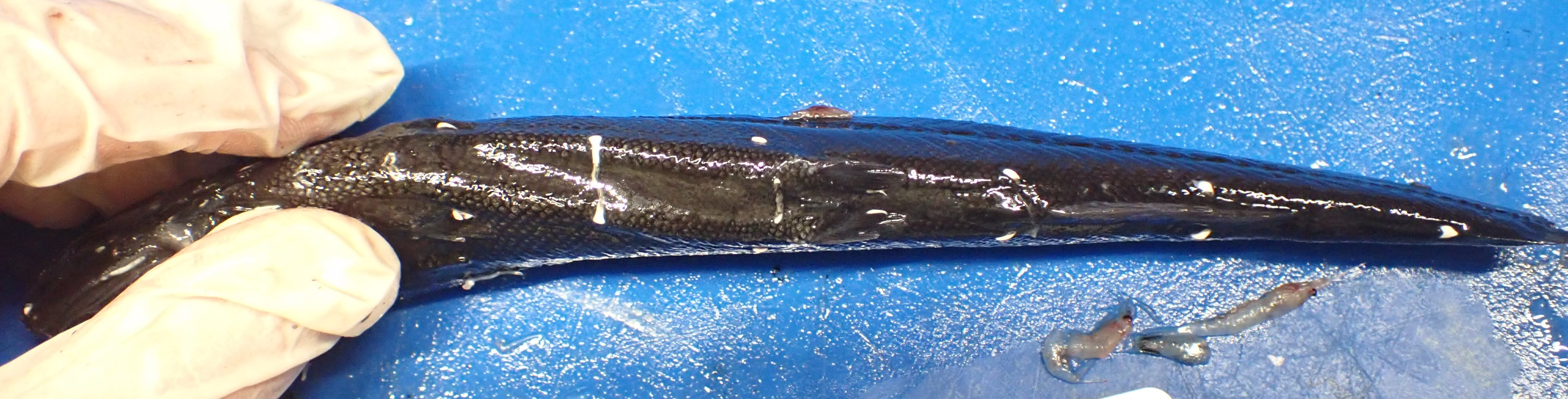
The underside of S. schnakenbecki showing the photophores.

Schnakenbeck's searsid has a long and slender body (maximum 27 cm (11 in)), dark in colour, with a short snout. It has 27–32 gill rakers, 7 or 8 branchiostegal rays and 9–11 pyloric caeca. The dorsal fin is far back, the pelvic fins behind the midpoint and the anal fin further back. It has photophores and a lateral line.

== Habitat ==
Schnakenbeck's searsid is benthopelagic, living in the eastern Atlantic Ocean at depths of 365–850 m (1,198–2,789 ft).
