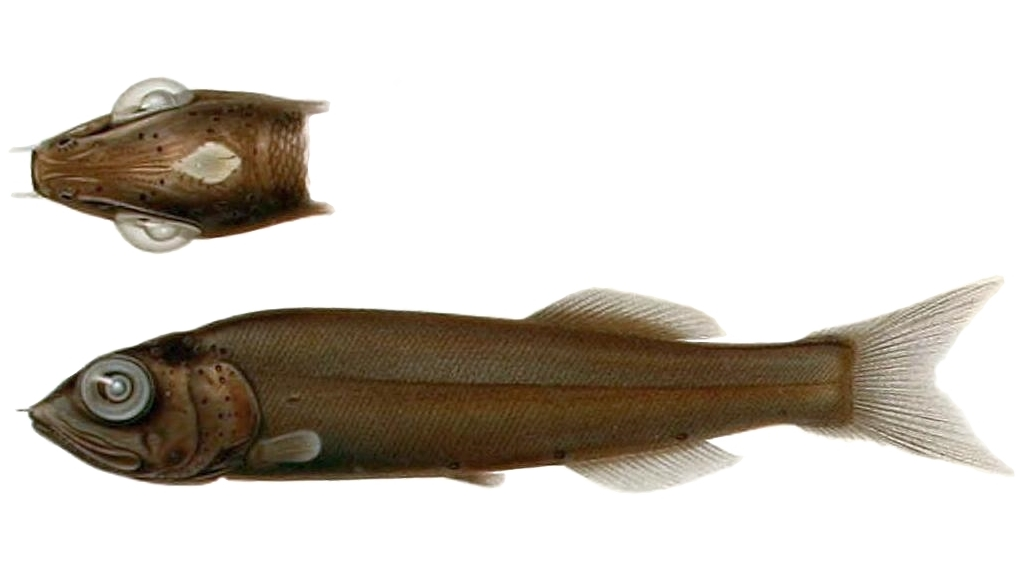
- Mentodus rostratus

Scientific classification
- Kingdom: Animalia
- Phylum: Chordata
- Class: Actinopterygii
- Order: Alepocephaliformes
- Family: Platytroctidae
- Genus: Mentodus; A. E. Parr, 1951

Type species
- Bathytroctes rostratus Günther, 1878

Synonyms
- Pellisolus A. E. Parr, 1951; Tragularius Matsui & Rosenblatt, 1987

= Mentodus =

Genus of ray-finned fishes

Mentodus is a genus of deepwater marine ray-finned fishes belonging to the family Platytroctidae, the tube shoulders. The species in this genus are known from tropical and temperate oceans around the world.

== Species ==
There are currently eight recognized species in this genus:

- Mentodus bythios (Matsui & Rosenblatt, 1987)
- Mentodus crassus A. E. Parr, 1960
- Mentodus eubranchus (Matsui & Rosenblatt, 1987)
- Mentodus facilis (A. E. Parr, 1951)
- Mentodus longirostris (Sazonov & Golovan, 1976)
- Mentodus mesalirus (Matsui & Rosenblatt, 1987)
- Mentodus perforatus Sazonov & Trunov, 1978
- Mentodus rostratus (Günther, 1878)
