= Maul's searsid =

Conservation status
- Least Concern (IUCN 3.1)

Scientific classification
- Kingdom: Animalia
- Phylum: Chordata
- Class: Actinopterygii
- Order: Alepocephaliformes
- Family: Platytroctidae
- Genus: Maulisia
- Species: M. mauli

Binomial name
- Maulisia mauli (Parr, 1960)

Species of fish

Maul's searsid (Maulisia mauli), also called Maul's tubeshoulder, is a species of fish in the family Platytroctidae (tubeshoulders), named for Günther Maul.

== Description ==
Maul's searsid is maximum 20 cm (7.9 in) long and is black in colour, with a pointed snout. Photophores are weakly developed; a lateral line is present. Its thoracic photophore is a horizontal bar.

== Habitat ==
Maul's searsid is mesopelagic and bathypelagic, living in the Atlantic Ocean and Indian Ocean at depths of 324–2,100 m (1,063–6,890 ft), usually at 400–1,200 m (1,310–3,940 ft); it is found on seamounts.
