= Mirorictus =

Scientific classification
- Kingdom: Animalia
- Phylum: Chordata
- Class: Actinopterygii
- Order: Alepocephaliformes
- Family: Platytroctidae
- Genus: Mirorictus; A. E. Parr, 1947
- Species: M. taningi

Binomial name
- Mirorictus taningi A. E. Parr, 1947

Genus of ray-finned fishes

Mirorictus taningi is a species of tubeshoulder only known from the Gulf of Panama where it is found at depths of around 1,750 metres (5,740 ft). This species grows to a length of 13.7 centimetres (5.4 in) TL.
