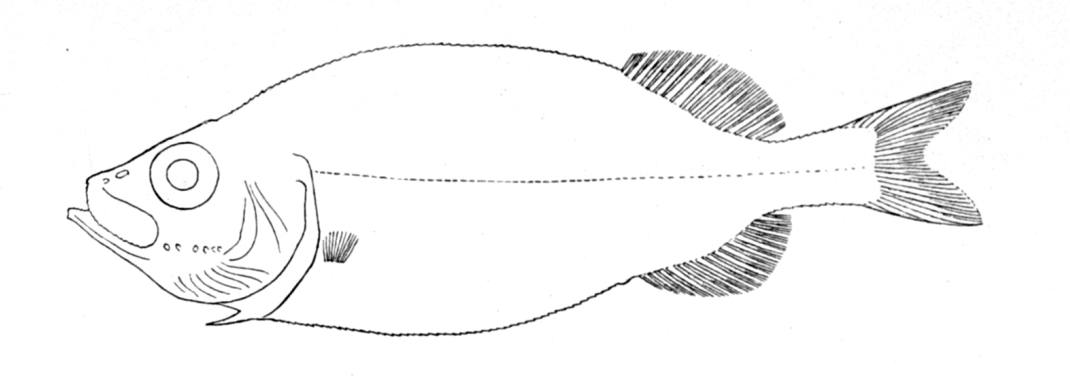
- Platytroctes apus

Scientific classification
- Kingdom: Animalia
- Phylum: Chordata
- Class: Actinopterygii
- Order: Alepocephaliformes
- Family: Platytroctidae
- Genus: Platytroctes; Günther, 1878

Type species
- Platytroctes apus Günther, 1878

Synonyms
- Platytroctegen Lloyd, 1909

= Platytroctes =

Genus of ray-finned fishes

Platytroctes is a genus of ray-finned fish in the family Platytroctidae, the tubeshoulders.

== Species ==
There are currently two recognized species in this genus:

- Platytroctes apus Günther, 1878 – legless searsid
- Platytroctes mirus (Lloyd, 1909) – leaf searsid
