= Holtbyrnia =

Scientific classification
- Kingdom: Animalia
- Phylum: Chordata
- Class: Actinopterygii
- Order: Alepocephaliformes
- Family: Platytroctidae
- Genus: Holtbyrnia; A. E. Parr, 1937

Type species
- Bathytroctes innesi Fowler, 1934

Synonyms
- Paraholtbyrnia Krefft, 1967

Genus of ray-finned fishes

Holtbyrnia is a genus of deepwater marine ray-finned fishes belonging to the family Platytroctidae, the tubeshoulders. The fishes in this genus are found in the Eastern Atlantic Ocean, the Indo-West Pacific and the southeastern Pacific Ocean.

== Species ==
There are currently ten recognized species in this genus:

- Holtbyrnia anomala Krefft, 1980 (Bighead searsid)
- Holtbyrnia conocephala Sazonov, 1976
- Holtbyrnia cyanocephala (Krefft, 1967)
- Holtbyrnia innesi (Fowler, 1934) (Teardrop tubeshoulder)
- Holtbyrnia intermedia (Sazonov, 1976)
- Holtbyrnia laticauda Sazonov, 1976 (Tusked tubeshoulder)
- Holtbyrnia latifrons Sazonov, 1976 (Streaklight tubeshoulder)
- Holtbyrnia macrops Maul, 1957 (Bigeye searsid)
- Holtbyrnia melanocephala (Vaillant, 1888)
- Holtbyrnia ophiocephala Sazonov & Golovan, 1976
