= Pectinantus =

Scientific classification
- Kingdom: Animalia
- Phylum: Chordata
- Class: Actinopterygii
- Division: Teleostei
- Order: Alepocephaliformes
- Family: Platytroctidae
- Genus: Pectinantus; Sazonov, 1986
- Species: P. parini

Binomial name
- Pectinantus parini (Sazonov, 1976)

Genus of ray-finned fishes

Pectinantus parini is a species of tubeshoulder known from the Pacific and Indian Oceans where it has been found at depths of around 1,750 metres (5,740 ft). This species grows to a length of 16.3 centimetres (6.4 in) SL.
