= Maulisia =

Scientific classification
- Kingdom: Animalia
- Phylum: Chordata
- Class: Actinopterygii
- Order: Alepocephaliformes
- Family: Platytroctidae
- Genus: Maulisia; A. E. Parr, 1960

Type species
- Maulisia mauli A. E. Parr, 1960

Synonyms
- Aphanichthys Matsui & Rosenblatt, 1987

Genus of ray-finned fishes

Maulisia is a genus of deepwater marine ray-finned fishes belonging to the family Platytroctidae, the tube shoulders. The species in this genus are known from the Eastern Atlantic and Eastern Pacific Oceans.

== Species ==
There are currently five recognized species in this genus:

- Maulisia acuticeps Sazonov, 1976 (Sharpsnout tubeshoulder)
- Maulisia argipalla Matsui & Rosenblatt, 1979 (Palegold searsid)
- Maulisia isaacsi Matsui & Rosenblatt, 1987
- Maulisia mauli A. E. Parr, 1960 (Maul's searsid)
- Maulisia microlepis Sazonov & Golovan, 1976 (Smallscale searsid)
