= Bighead searsid =

Conservation status
- Least Concern (IUCN 3.1)

Scientific classification
- Kingdom: Animalia
- Phylum: Chordata
- Class: Actinopterygii
- Order: Alepocephaliformes
- Family: Platytroctidae
- Genus: Holtbyrnia
- Species: H. anomala

Binomial name
- Holtbyrnia anomala (Krefft, 1980)

Species of fish

The bighead searsid (Holtbyrnia anomala) is a species of tubeshoulder fish.

== Description ==
It maximum length is 25 cm (9.8 in). Its head is large, making up over a third of the fish's length. It has 25–31 gillrakers; 5–11 pyloric caecae. The snout is pointed, with premaxillary tusks pointing forward.

It is dark red in colour. Its photophores are rudimentary (except for the shoulder organ), hence its specific name anomala ("unusual").

== Habitat ==
The bighead searsid lives in the North Atlantic Ocean; it is a mesopelagic fish, living at depths of 700–2,000 m (2,300–6,600 ft).
