= Persparsia =

Scientific classification
- Kingdom: Animalia
- Phylum: Chordata
- Class: Actinopterygii
- Order: Alepocephaliformes
- Family: Platytroctidae
- Genus: Persparsia; A. E. Parr, 1951
- Species: P. kopua

Binomial name
- Persparsia kopua (Phillipps, 1942)

Synonyms
- Bathytroctes kopua Phillipps, 1942

Genus of ray-finned fishes

Persparsia kopua, the spangled tubeshoulder, is a species of tubeshoulder found around the world in the southern hemisphere (apart from South America) between latitudes 30° S and 50° S and at depths of 700 to 1,500 metres (2,300 to 4,900 ft). Its length is up to 14 centimetres (5.5 in) TL. Persparsia kopua is a mesopelagic species.
