= Normichthys =

Scientific classification
- Kingdom: Animalia
- Phylum: Chordata
- Class: Actinopterygii
- Order: Alepocephaliformes
- Family: Platytroctidae
- Genus: Normichthys; A. E. Parr, 1951

Type species
- Normichthys operosus A. E. Parr, 1951

Genus of ray-finned fishes

Normichthys is a genus of deepwater marine ray-finned fishes belonging to the family Platytroctidae, the tube shoulders. The species in this genus are known from tropical and temperate oceans around the world.

The name of the genus honours the British ichthyologist John Roxborough Norman who reported the type species of this genus, N. operosus, as Talismania homoptera in 1930.

== Species ==
There are currently three recognized species in this genus:

- Normichthys herringi Sazonov & Merrett, 2001
- Normichthys operosus A. E. Parr, 1951 (Multipore searsid)
- Normichthys yahganorum Lavenberg, 1965
