= Barbantus =

Scientific classification
- Kingdom: Animalia
- Phylum: Chordata
- Class: Actinopterygii
- Order: Alepocephaliformes
- Family: Platytroctidae
- Genus: Barbantus; A. E. Parr, 1951

Type species
- Bathytroctes curvifrons Roule & Angel, 1931

Genus of ray-finned fishes

Barbantus s a genus of deepwater marine ray-finned fishes belonging to the family Platytroctidae, the tube shoulders. The fishes in this genus are found in the tropical and temperate areas of the world's oceans but are best known from the Atlantic Ocean.

== Species ==
There are currently two recognized species in this genus:

- Barbantus curvifrons (Roule & Angel, 1931) (Palebelly searsid)
- Barbantus elongatus G. Krefft, 1970
