= Sagamichthys =

Scientific classification
- Kingdom: Animalia
- Phylum: Chordata
- Class: Actinopterygii
- Order: Alepocephaliformes
- Family: Platytroctidae
- Genus: Sagamichthys; A. E. Parr, 1953

Type species
- Sagamichthys abei A.E. Parr 1953

Synonyms
- Krefftia A. E. Parr, 1960

Genus of ray-finned fishes

Sagamichthys is a genus of tubeshoulders. The generic name derives from Sagami Bay, Japan (home of Sagamichthys abei), and the Greek ἰχθύς (ichthys), "fish".

== Species ==
There are currently three recognized species in this genus:

- Sagamichthys abei A. E. Parr, 1953 (Shining tubeshoulder)
- Sagamichthys gracilis Sazonov, 1978
- Sagamichthys schnakenbecki (Krefft, 1953) (Schnakenbeck's searsid)
