= Barbantus curvifrons =

Conservation status
- Least Concern (IUCN 3.1)

Scientific classification
- Domain: Eukaryota
- Kingdom: Animalia
- Phylum: Chordata
- Class: Actinopterygii
- Order: Alepocephaliformes
- Family: Platytroctidae
- Genus: Barbantus
- Species: B. curvifrons

Binomial name
- Barbantus curvifrons (Roule & Angel, 1931)

Synonyms
- Bathytroctes curvifrons Roule & Angel, 1931

Species of fish

Barbantus curvifrons, commonly known as the palebelly searsid, is a species of ray-finned fish known from the Indian Ocean, the Pacific Ocean and the eastern Atlantic Ocean where it has been found at depths below 500 metres (1,600 ft). The generic name Barbantus is derived from the Latin, "barba", a beard.

== Description ==
This species has a moderately elongate and laterally compressed body. The lower jaw has a short sideways-projecting spine on either side near the tip. The dorsal fin has 15 to 21 soft rays and the anal fin has 14 to 17. The small pelvic fins are at the midpoint of the body, the origin of the dorsal fin is slightly behind this and the origin of the anal fin is below the centre of the dorsal fin. This fish is a uniformly dark colour except for a row of light-coloured, opalescent scales along the belly. It grows to a maximum length of 13 centimetres (5.1 in) SL, but 7 to 11 centimetres (2.8 to 4.3 in) is a more normal size.

== Distribution and habitat ==
Barbantus curvifrons has a wide distribution. Its range includes subtropical and tropical waters in the Indian and Pacific Oceans, and temperate, subtropical and tropical waters in the eastern Atlantic Ocean, from the Bay of Biscay southwards to Angola; it is absent from the western Atlantic. It is generally a bathypelagic species, occurring at depths greater than 1,000 m (3,300 ft); its occasional capture between 425 and 525 m (1,400 and 1,700 ft) is indicative of a pattern of diurnal vertical migration. In a particularly warm period between 1996 and 2005, it was found at 320 metres (1,050 ft) off the coast of Greenland, well to the north of its normal range.

== Status ==
Barbantus curvifrons has a widespread distribution but does not seem to be a common species. It is not of interest to fisheries and lives at such great depths that it is likely to face few threats, so the International Union for Conservation of Nature has assessed its conservation status as being of "least concern".
