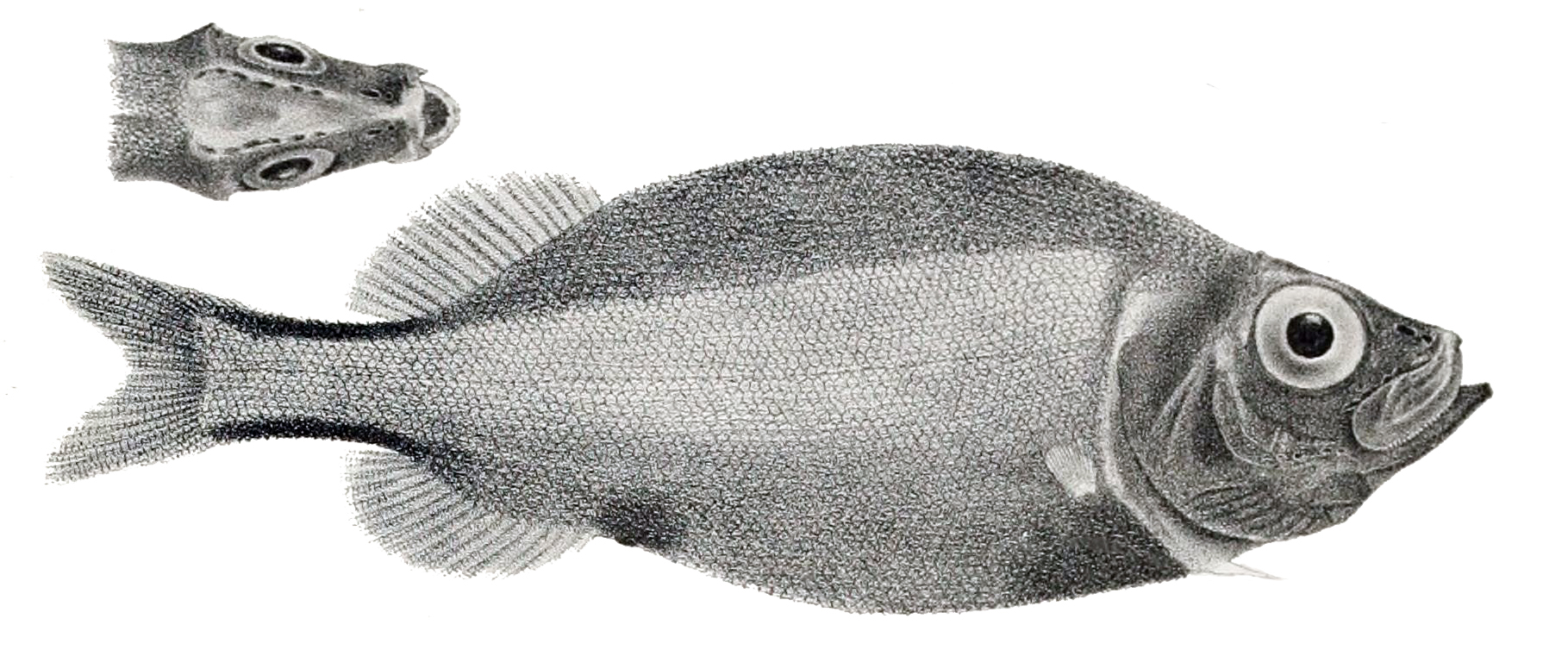

Conservation status
- Least Concern (IUCN 3.1)

Scientific classification
- Domain: Eukaryota
- Kingdom: Animalia
- Phylum: Chordata
- Class: Actinopterygii
- Order: Alepocephaliformes
- Family: Platytroctidae
- Genus: Platytroctes
- Species: P. apus

Binomial name
- Platytroctes apus Günther, 1878

= Platytroctes apus =

Species of ray-finned fish

Platytroctes apus is a species of ray-finned fish in the family Platytroctidae, the tubeshoulders. It is known commonly as the legless searsid and legless tubeshoulder. It is native to tropical and temperate oceans around the world. It has been found at depths between 385 and 5393 meters, but it generally remains between 1000 and 2000 meters.

Little is known about this rarely-collected deepsea fish. It reaches up to 18 centimeters in length. Its body is laterally compressed and is described as "leaf-like" and "flabby". It is dark brown in color with luminous patches.
