= Searsioides =

Scientific classification
- Kingdom: Animalia
- Phylum: Chordata
- Class: Actinopterygii
- Order: Alepocephaliformes
- Family: Platytroctidae
- Genus: Searsioides; Sazonov, 1977

Type species
- Searsioides multispinus Sazonov, 1977

Genus of ray-finned fishes

Searsioides is a genus of tubeshoulders native to the western central Pacific Ocean.

== Species ==
There are currently two recognized species in this genus:

- Searsioides calvala (Matsui & Rosenblatt, 1979)
- Searsioides multispinus (Sazonov, 1977)
