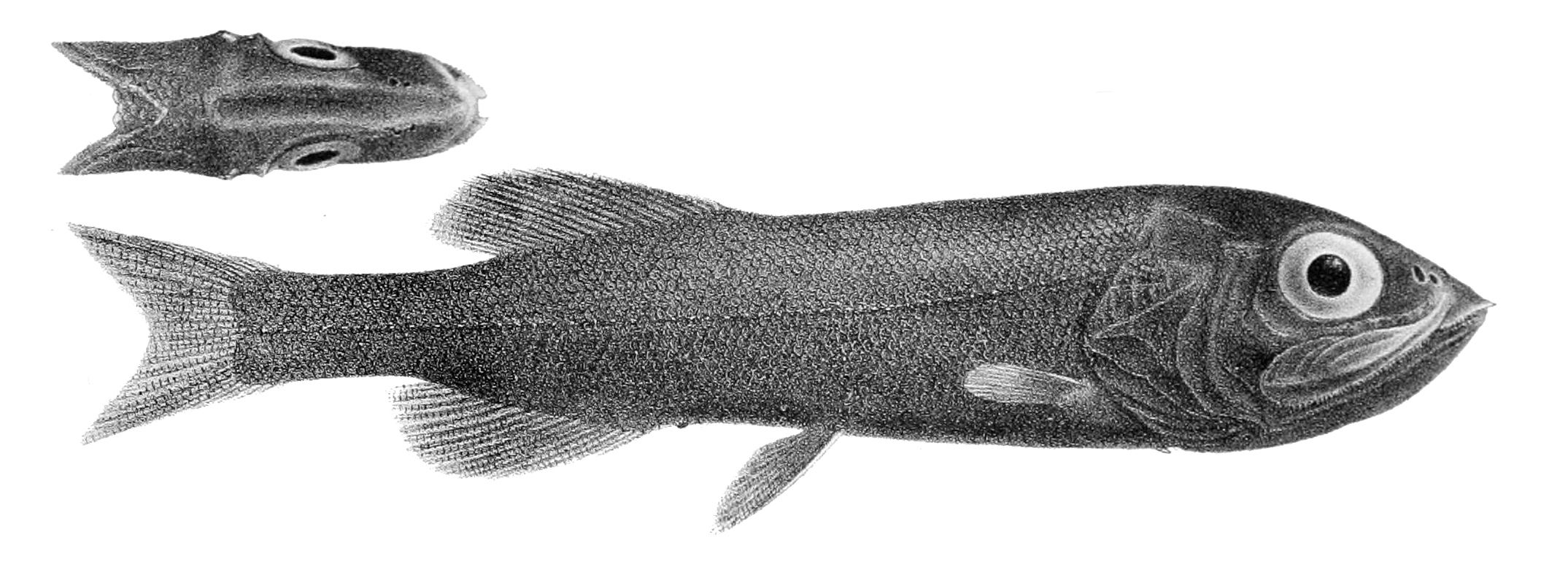

Conservation status
- Least Concern (IUCN 3.1)

Scientific classification
- Kingdom: Animalia
- Phylum: Chordata
- Class: Actinopterygii
- Order: Alepocephaliformes
- Family: Platytroctidae
- Genus: Searsia; A. E. Parr, 1937
- Species: S. koefoedi

Binomial name
- Searsia koefoedi A. E. Parr, 1937

= Searsia koefoedi =

Species of ray-finned fish

Searsia koefoedi, or Koefoed's searsid, is a species of tubeshoulder found in the oceans at depths of from 450 to 1,500 metres (1,480 to 4,920 ft). It is named after Norwegian marine biologist Einar Koefoed.

== Size ==
This species grows to a length of 15 centimetres (5.9 in) SL.

== Habitat and distribution ==
Searsia koefoedi can be found in a marine environment within a depth range of 450 to 1,500 metres (1,480 to 4,920 ft). They live in deep-water environments. They are native to the areas of Eastern Atlantic, Denmark Strait, the Gulf of Guinea Northwest Atlantic in subtropical waters, Indian and Pacific oceans within tropical waters.

== Etymology ==
The fish is named in honor of Norwegian marine biologist Einar Koefoed (1875–1963), who was responsible for the collected part of the type specimens in 1926 and who authored several papers on deep-sea fishes.
