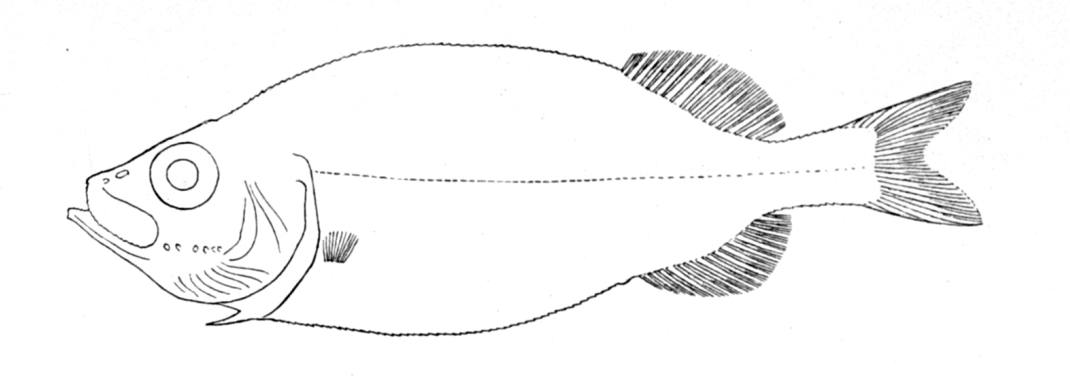
- Legless searsid (Platytroctes apus)

Scientific classification
- Kingdom: Animalia
- Phylum: Chordata
- Class: Actinopterygii
- Order: Alepocephaliformes
- Family: Platytroctidae; Koefoed, 1927

Genera
- See text

Synonyms
- Platytroctidés Roule 1916; Searsiidae Parr 1951 corrig. Lindberg 1971; Barbantini Sazonov 1986; Mirorictinae Parr 1951

= Platytroctidae =

Family of ray-finned fishes

The tubeshoulders are a family, Platytroctidae, of ray-finned fish belonging to the order Alepocephaliformes. They are found throughout the world, except for the Mediterranean Sea. Tubeshoulders live at moderate depths of 300 to 1,000 m (980 to 3,280 ft), and some have light-producing organs. They are generally small to medium fish, ranging from 9 to 33 cm (3.5 to 13.0 in) in length.

== Genera ==
The family contains the following genera:

- Barbantus Parr, 1951
- Holtbyrnia Parr, 1937
- Matsuichthys Sazonov, 1992
- Maulisia Parr, 1960
- Mentodus Parr, 1951
- Mirorictus Parr, 1947
- Normichthys Parr, 1951
- Pectinantus Sazonov, 1986
- Persparsia Parr, 1951
- Platytroctes Günther, 1878
- Sagamichthys Parr, 1953
- Searsia Parr, 1937
- Searsioides Sazonov, 1977
- †Vachalia Přikryl & Carnevale, 2019
