= Fur-bearing trout =

Legendary creature

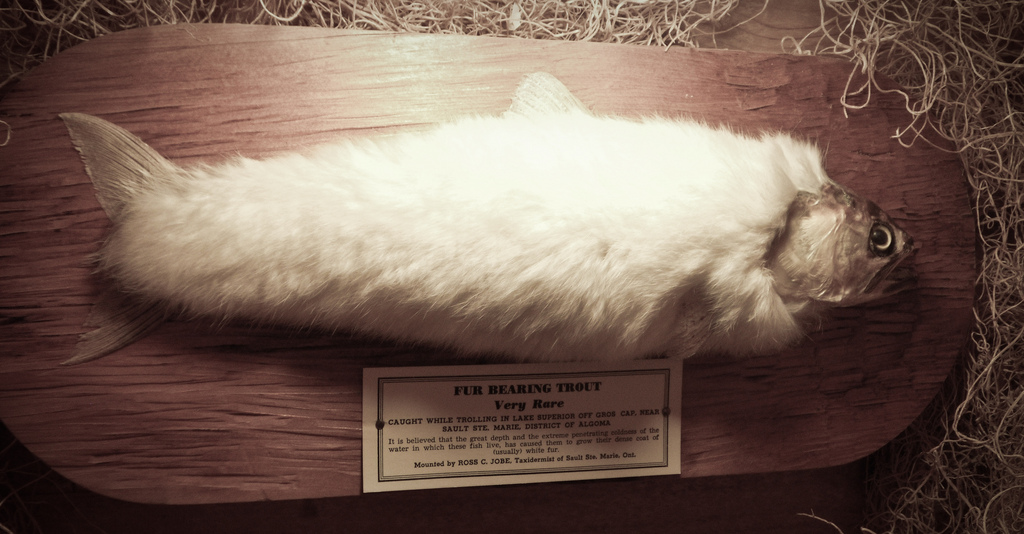
A mounted "fur-bearing trout" like the one once displayed in the National Museum of Scotland

The fur-bearing trout (or furry trout) is a legendary creature found in American folklore and Icelandic folklore. According to folklore, the trout has created a thick coat of fur to maintain its body heat. Tales of furry fish date to the 17th century. The earliest known American publication dates from a 1929 Montana Wildlife magazine article by J.H. Hicken. A taxidermy furry trout produced by Ross C. Jobe is a specimen at the Royal Museum of Scotland; it is a trout with white rabbit fur "ingeniously" attached.

There are no known examples of any fur-bearing trout species, but other examples of hair-like growths on fish are known. The "cotton mold", Saprolegnia, can infect fish, which can result in the appearance of fish covered in white "fur". Another fish, Mirapinna esau, has hairlike outgrowth and sports wing-like pectoral fins. The hairy ghost pipefish Solenostomus snuffleupagus also has hairlike growths.

== Commonalities ==
Fur-bearing trout are fictional creatures that are purportedly found in the Arkansas River, northern North America, and Iceland. The basic claim (or tall tale) is that the waters of lakes and rivers in the area are so cold that they evolved a thick coat of fur to maintain their body heat. Another theory says that it is due to four jugs – or two bottles – of hair tonic being spilled into the Arkansas River.

The origins vary, but one of the earlier claims date to a 17th-century Scottish immigrant's letter to his relatives referring to "furried animals and fish" being plentiful in the New World. It was followed by request to procure a specimen of these "furried fish" and one was sent home. A publication in 1900 recounts the Icelandic Lodsilungur, another haired trout, as being a common folklore. The earliest known American publication dates from a 1929 Montana Wildlife magazine article by J.H. Hicken.

The "cotton mold" Saprolegnia will sometimes infect fish, causing tufts of fur-like growth to appear on the body. A heavy infection will result in the fish's death, and as the fungus continues to grow afterward, dead fish that are largely covered in the white "fur" can occasionally be found washed ashore. A real species of fish, Mirapinna esau, is known for the numerous hairlike structures on its body. This fish is not related to trouts but is instead a whalefish. It was discovered in the Azores in 1956.

== Icelandic Loðsilungur ==
According to Icelandic legend, the Lodsilungur (Loðsilungur) is a furry trout that is the creation of demons and giants. The Lodsilungur are described as inedible fish that overwhelm rivers and are a form of punishment for human wickedness. In 1900, The Scottish Review featured an account of the Lodsilungur as a poisonous "Shaggy trout" of northern Iceland. In 1854, a shaggy trout was "cast on shore at Svina-vatn" and featured in an 1855 illustration in Nordri, a newspaper. It was described as having a reddish hair on its lower jaw and neck, sides and fins, but the writer of the Nordri article did not specifically identify it by name. Sjón, a popular Icelandic writer, became obsessed with the folk tale when he was nine. Sjón recounted that if a man were to eat the furry trout he would become pregnant and that his scrotum would have to be cut open to deliver the baby. Sjón noted that the story "might explain why I was later propelled towards surrealism."

== United States furry trout ==
An account of a furry trout appeared in 1929 in Montana Wildlife magazine and was first noted by J.H. Hicken. Hicken's account states that when the fish is caught "the change of temperature from this water to atmosphere is so great that the fish explodes upon being taken from the water, and fur and skin come off in one perfect piece, making it available for commercial purposes, and leaving the body of the fish for refrigerator purposes or eating, as desired."

My Ten Years in a Quandary, and How They Grew, a 1936 bestselling book by Robert Benchley, contains the humorous essay "Bad News" about a report of fur-bearing trout used as a goiter cure.

Another fur-bearing trout story originated with Wilbur Foshay, secretary of the Chamber of Commerce. Foshay promoted the story so convincingly that it was picked up by the Salida Record newspaper. According to its Foshay, the trout grew fur due to the cold temperatures of the Arkansas River and shed the fur as the water temperatures warmed in the summer. In November 1938, a story in the Puebloan Cheiftan recounted the hairy trout history and stated that "[o]ld-timers living along the Arkansas River near Salida have told tales for many years of the fur-bearing trout indigenous to the waters of the Arkansas near there." In 2014, Mysteries at the Museum visited the Salida Museum and as of May 2014 is expected to be part of a segment in late 2014.

A tall tale was recounted by S.E. Schlosser, it states that hairy trout resulted from two bottles or four jugs of spilled hair tonic. To catch hairy trout, fisherman would act as barbers and lure fish from the waters with the offer of a free trim or shave. An intentionally fantastical story in Maine claimed that hairy trout were under a catch and release policy that was enforced by wardens carrying Brannock Devices. If a fish were caught, the warden would measure it against the fisher's foot. If the fish's length matched the fisher's foot size, the fish could be eaten and the pelt made into furry slippers.

== Canada ==
The Canadian fur-bearing trout is another example of the furry trout hoax. According to the story, a trout with white fur was caught in Lake Superior off Gros Cap in Sault Ste. Marie, Ontario, Algoma District, Canada, and its taxidermist was Ross C. Jobe of Sault Ste. Marie. The purchaser of the fish learned of the hoax after presenting it to the Royal Museum of Scotland. The white fur of a rabbit was described as being "ingeniously" attached to the fish. A fictional description of the Canadian "Hairy" Trout was published by Takeshi Yamada.

== See also ==
- Fearsome critters
- Fish fur
