= Northern teiid =

There are two species of lizard named northern teiid:

- Alopoglossus angulatus, species endemic to northern South America
- Alopoglossus carinicaudatus, a species found in Ecuador and Peru
