= S. lepidus =

S. lepidus may refer to:

- Scopelosaurus lepidus, a species in the genus Scopelosaurus
- Sitona lepidus, a weevil species in the genus Sitona
- Stictonectes lepidus, a beetle species in the genus Stictonectes

== See also ==
- Lepidus (disambiguation)
