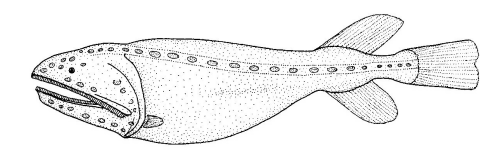
- Drawing by Dr Tony Ayling

Conservation status
- Least Concern (IUCN 3.1)

Scientific classification
- Kingdom: Animalia
- Phylum: Chordata
- Class: Actinopterygii
- Order: Beryciformes
- Family: Cetomimidae
- Genus: Gyrinomimus
- Species: G. grahami

Binomial name
- Gyrinomimus grahami L. R. Richardson & Garrick, 1964

= Gyrinomimus grahami =

Species of fish

Gyrinomimus grahami is a flabby whalefish of the genus Gyrinomimus, found in all the southern oceans.

== Size ==
This species reaches a length of 31.0 cm (12.2 in).

== Etymology ==
The fish is named in honor of David H. Graham, a New Zealand ichthyologist and marine biologist.
