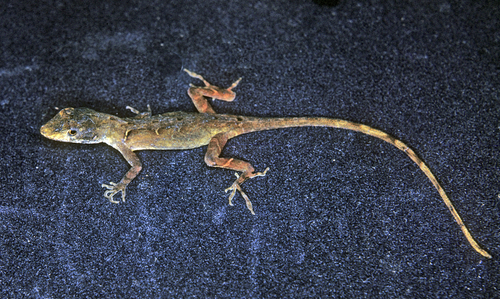

Conservation status
- Least Concern (IUCN 3.1)

Scientific classification
- Kingdom: Animalia
- Phylum: Chordata
- Class: Reptilia
- Order: Squamata
- Suborder: Iguania
- Family: Dactyloidae
- Genus: Anolis
- Species: A. dollfusianus

Binomial name
- Anolis dollfusianus Bocourt, 1873

Synonyms
- Anolis dollfusianus Bocourt, 1873; Norops dollfusianus — Guyer & Savage, 1976; Anolis dollfusianus — Liner, 2007

= Anolis dollfusianus =

Species of lizard

Anolis dollfusianus, also known commonly as the coffee anole and el abaniquillo de cafetal in Spanish, is a species of lizard in the family Dactyloidae. The species is native Guatemala and Mexico.

== Etymology ==
The specific name, dollfusianus, is in honor of French zoologist Auguste Dollfus.

== Geographic range ==
A. dollfusianus is found in western Guatemala and in the southernmost Mexican state of Chiapas.

== Habitat ==
The preferred natural habitat of A. dollfusianus is forest, but the species also occurs in coffee plantations. It is found at altitudes of 200–1,200 m (660–3,940 ft).

== Reproduction ==
A. dollfusianus is oviparous.
