= Pristimantis moro =

Conservation status
- Least Concern (IUCN 3.1)

Scientific classification
- Kingdom: Animalia
- Phylum: Chordata
- Class: Amphibia
- Order: Anura
- Family: Strabomantidae
- Genus: Pristimantis
- Subgenus: Hypodictyon
- Species: P. moro

Binomial name
- Pristimantis moro (Savage, 1965)

Synonyms
- Eleutherodactylus moro Savage, 1965; Eleutherodactylus lehmanvalenciae Thornton, 1965; Pristimantis moro — Heinicke, Duellman & Hedges, 2007

Species of frog

Pristimantis moro, also known as La Hondura robber frog, is a species of frog in the family Strabomantidae. It is found in lowland western Colombia (Valle del Cauca Department), the Pacific versant of Panama, and the Atlantic versant of Costa Rica.

== Taxonomy ==
Pristimantis moro was described by Jay M. Savage in 1965 as Eleutherodactylus moro. The specific name moro honors John Luther Mohr, a specialist in anuran enterofauna. The same species was described as Eleutherodactylus lehmanvalenciae by W. A. Thornton later in 1965, thus making it junior synonym of Eleutherodactylus moro. The specific name lehmanvalenciae honors Carlos Lehman Valencia, in recognition of "his many contributions furthering the knowledge of Colombian natural history".

== Description ==
Pristimantis moro is a small frog, with males growing to a snout–vent length (SVL) of 19.5 mm (0.77 in) and females to 25 mm (0.98 in) SVL. The tympanum is distinct but small. The fingers and toes have distinct, rounded disks but no webbing. The dorsum is uniformly green, turning reddish or orange-red in the head. The lower surfaces are pale greenish yellow or creamy white, with the throat being yellowish. The iris is reddish-orange.

== Habitat and conservation ==
Pristimantis moro lives in humid lowland and montane forests from sea level to 1,245 m (4,085 ft) above sea level. It is a nocturnal and arboreal species living in the forest canopy. This, together with its small size, makes it difficult to observe, making it prone to under-recording. Threats to it are unknown. It is present in some protected areas in Panama and Costa Rica.
