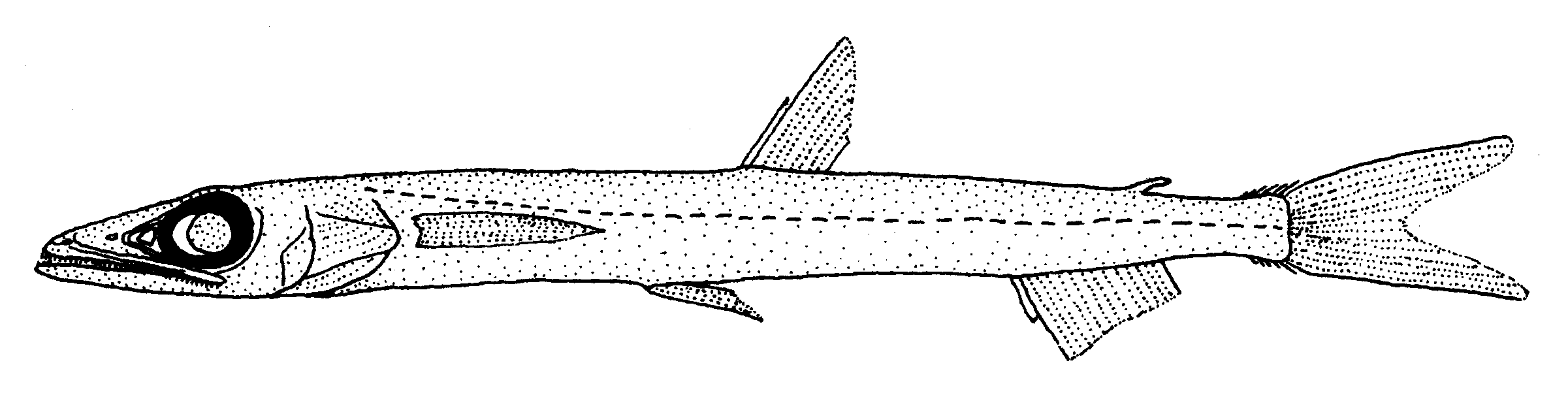
- Drawing by Dr Tony Ayling

Scientific classification
- Kingdom: Animalia
- Phylum: Chordata
- Class: Actinopterygii
- Order: Aulopiformes
- Family: Notosudidae
- Genus: Scopelosaurus
- Species: S. ahlstromi

Binomial name
- Scopelosaurus ahlstromi Bertelsen, G. Krefft & N. B. Marshall, 1976

= Scopelosaurus ahlstromi =

Species of fish found in all oceans

Scopelosaurus ahlstromi is a waryfish of the family Notosudidae, found in all oceans, at depths of down to 500 m. Its length is between 15 and 25 cm.
