= Ahliesaurus =

Scientific classification
- Kingdom: Animalia
- Phylum: Chordata
- Class: Actinopterygii
- Order: Aulopiformes
- Family: Notosudidae
- Genus: Ahliesaurus; Bertelsen, G. Krefft & N. B. Marshall, 1976

Genus of fishes

Ahliesaurus is a genus of waryfishes.

== Etymology ==
The genus is named in honor of ichthyologist Elbert H. Ahlstrom (1910–1979), of the Southwest Fisheries Center, National Marine Fisheries Service.

== Species ==
There are currently two recognized species in this genus:

- Ahliesaurus berryi Bertelsen, G. Krefft & N. B. Marshall, 1976
- Ahliesaurus brevis Bertelsen, G. Krefft & N. B. Marshall, 1976
