= Parataeniophorus =

Scientific classification
- Kingdom: Animalia
- Phylum: Chordata
- Class: Actinopterygii
- Order: Beryciformes
- Family: Cetomimidae
- Genus: Parataeniophorus; Bertelsen & N. B. Marshall, 1956

Genus of fishes

Parataeniophorus is a genus of flabby whalefishes that was formerly included in the no longer recognized tapetail family Mirapinnidae.

== Species ==
There are currently three recognized species in this genus:

- Parataeniophorus bertelseni Shiganova, 1989
- Parataeniophorus brevis Bertelsen & N. B. Marshall, 1956 (Short tapetail)
- Parataeniophorus gulosus Bertelsen & N. B. Marshall, 1956
