= Cetichthys indagator =

Conservation status
- Least Concern (IUCN 3.1)

Scientific classification
- Kingdom: Animalia
- Phylum: Chordata
- Class: Actinopterygii
- Division: Teleostei
- Order: Beryciformes
- Family: Cetomimidae
- Genus: Cetichthys
- Species: C. indagator

Binomial name
- Cetichthys indagator Rofen, 1959

Species of fish

Cetichthys indagator is a species of flabby whalefish in the family Cetomimidae and was first described in 1959 by Robert Rees Harry-Rofen as Cetomimus indagator In 1989, it was transferred to the genus, Cetichthys by John R. Paxton.

This pelagic fish has been found at depths of 1500 - 3620 m in the Atlantic, the Indian and Pacific oceans at latitudes of 30 to 40 degrees south.
