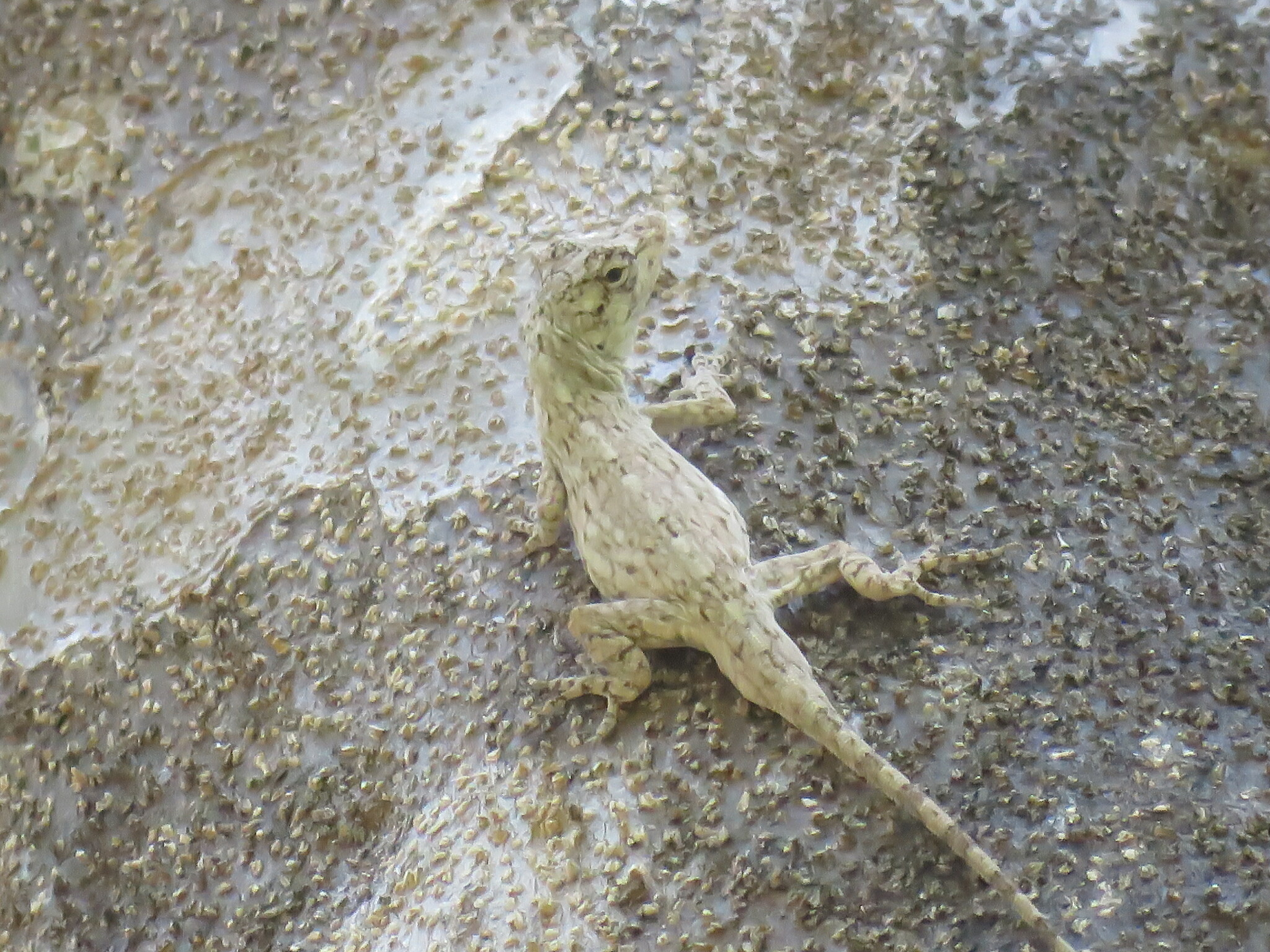

Conservation status
- Least Concern (IUCN 3.1)

Scientific classification
- Kingdom: Animalia
- Phylum: Chordata
- Class: Reptilia
- Order: Squamata
- Suborder: Iguania
- Family: Dactyloidae
- Genus: Anolis
- Species: A. beckeri

Binomial name
- Anolis beckeri Boulenger, 1881

Synonyms
- Anolis beckeri Boulenger, 1881; Anolis pentaprion becker — Etheridge, 1959; Anolis beckeri — G. Köhler, 2010; Norops beckeri — Nicholson, Crother, Guyer & Savage, 2012

= Anolis beckeri =

Species of lizard

Anolis beckeri, also known commonly as Becker's anole and Becker's lichen anole, is a species of lizard in the family Dactyloidae. The species is native to Central America and southern North America.

== Etymology ==
The specific name, beckeri, is in honor of Belgian arachnologist Léon Becker.

== Geographic range ==
A. beckeri is found in Belize, Guatemala, Honduras, southeastern Mexico (Campeche, Chiapas, Oaxaca, Quintana Roo, Tabasco, Veracruz), and northern Nicaragua.

== Habitat ==
The preferred natural habitat of A. beckeri is forest, at altitudes of 2–900 m (6.6–2,952.8 ft).

== Description ==
Medium-sized for its genus, A. beckeri may attain a snout-to-vent length (SVL) of 6 cm (2.4 in). The tail is relatively short, 1–1.5 times SVL.

== Behavior ==
A. beckeri is arboreal.

== Reproduction ==
A. beckeri is oviparous. Eggs are laid high in trees, in epiphytic bromeliads, and the adult female displays some parental care.
