= Eutaeniophorus =

Festive ribbonfish

Conservation status
- Least Concern (IUCN 3.1)

Scientific classification
- Kingdom: Animalia
- Phylum: Chordata
- Class: Actinopterygii
- Order: Beryciformes
- Family: Cetomimidae
- Genus: Eutaeniophorus; Bertelsen & N. B. Marshall, 1958
- Species: E. festivus

Binomial name
- Eutaeniophorus festivus (Bertelsen & N. B. Marshall, 1956)

Genus of fishes

Eutaeniophorus is a genus of flabby whalefish found at depths of from 10 to 200 metres (33 to 656 ft) in the oceans. It is monotypic, being represented by the single species, the festive ribbonfish (Eutaeniophorus festivus) which can grow to a length of 5.3 centimetres (2.1 in) TL.
