= Cetichthys =

Scientific classification
- Kingdom: Animalia
- Phylum: Chordata
- Class: Actinopterygii
- Order: Beryciformes
- Family: Cetomimidae
- Genus: Cetichthys; Paxton, 1989

Genus of fishes

Cetichthys is a genus of flabby whalefishes, which was first described in 1989 by John R. Paxton.

== Species ==
There are currently two recognized species in this genus:

- Cetichthys indagator (Rofen, 1959)
- Cetichthys parini Paxton, 1989
