= Alopoglossus stenolepis =

Conservation status
- Least Concern (IUCN 3.1)

Scientific classification
- Kingdom: Animalia
- Phylum: Chordata
- Class: Reptilia
- Order: Squamata
- Family: Alopoglossidae
- Genus: Alopoglossus
- Species: A. stenolepis

Binomial name
- Alopoglossus stenolepis (Boulenger, 1908)
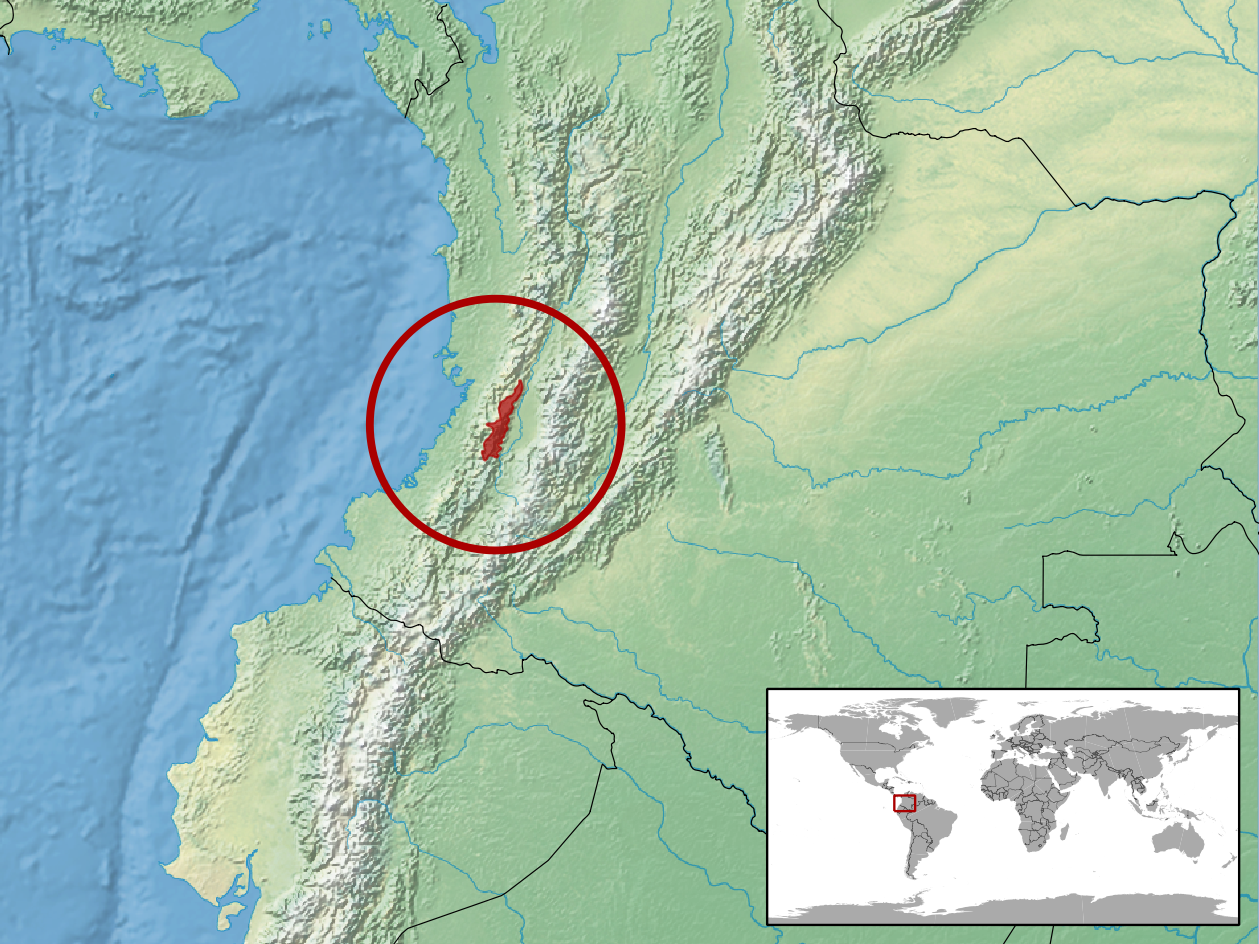

Synonyms
- Ptychoglossus stenolepis

Species of lizard

Alopoglossus stenolepis is a species of lizard in the family Alopoglossidae. It is endemic to in Colombia, mainly near Cali.
