= Alopoglossus gansorum =

Scientific classification
- Kingdom: Animalia
- Phylum: Chordata
- Class: Reptilia
- Order: Squamata
- Family: Alopoglossidae
- Genus: Alopoglossus
- Species: A. gansorum

Binomial name
- Alopoglossus gansorum Ribeiro‐Júnior, Sánchez‐Martínez, Moraes, Oliveira, Carvalho, Choueri, Werneck, & Meiri, 2021

Species of lizard

Alopoglossus gansorum is a species of lizard in the family Alopoglossidae. It is endemic to Brazil.
