= Vitiaziella =

Conservation status
- Least Concern (IUCN 3.1)

Scientific classification
- Kingdom: Animalia
- Phylum: Chordata
- Class: Actinopterygii
- Order: Beryciformes
- Family: Cetomimidae
- Genus: Vitiaziella; Rass (ru), 1955
- Species: V. cubiceps

Binomial name
- Vitiaziella cubiceps Rass (ru), 1955

Species of fish

Vitiaziella cubiceps is a species of fish in the family Cetomimidae known from the Kuril–Kamchatka Trench and the South China Sea at depths of from 1,500 to 6,200 metres (4,900 to 20,300 ft); it is considered as rare species. The habitat of this fish is oceanic depth of 1,5-4,5 km. It is the only known member of its genus. This fish is named in honour of Soviet oceanographic ship "Vitiaz" (another species named after this ship are Gonostoma vitiazi Rass, 1950; Lycenchelys vitiazi Andriashev, 1955; Pelagocyclus vitiazi Lindberg et Legesa, 1955; Cypselurus vitjazi Parin, 1958; Diaphus vitiazi Kulikova, 1961; Benthodesmus vitiazi Parin et Becker, 1970; Monomeropus vitiazi Nielsen, 1971; Eustomias vitiazi Parin et Pokhilskaya 1974; Melanostigma vitiazi Parin, 1980). Type specimen had been caught first in 1949 by Soviet expedition near Kuril Islands. No females of this species are known.
