= Friedrich Carl Lehmann =

German Consul to Colombia, mining engineer, botanist, mycologist and botanical collector

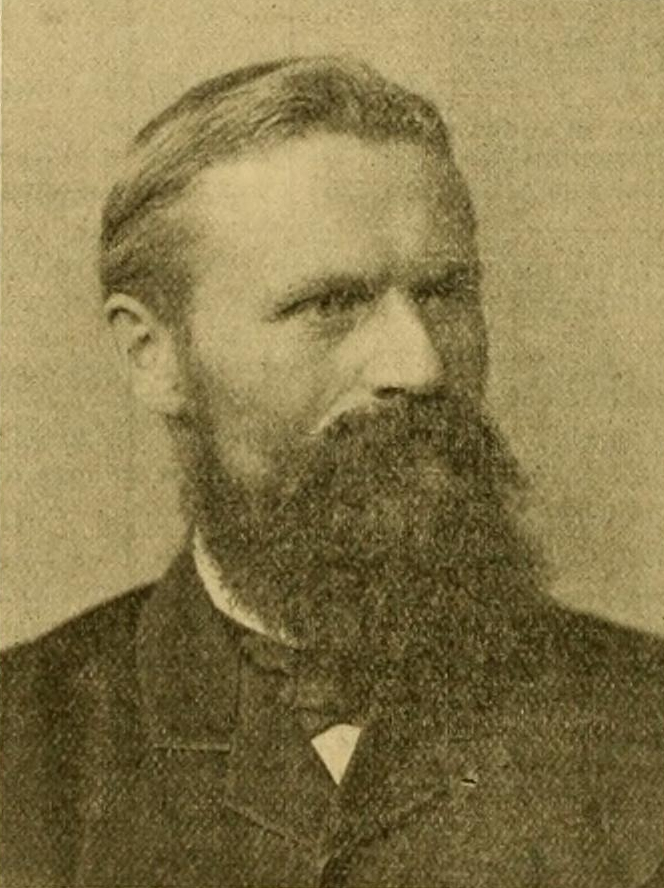
- Born: 27 November 1850; Germany
- Died: November 23, 1903 (aged 52)
- Scientific career
- Fields: Botany; Orchidology

Friedrich Carl Lehmann (27 November 1850 – 23 November 1903) was a German Consul to Colombia, mining engineer, amateur botanist and mycologist, and botanical collector.

== Career ==
Lehmann conducted explorations in search of specimens of flora in the countries of Ecuador and Colombia over three decades, sending collected material to herbaria in Berlin-Dahlem, Kew, and Saint Petersburg. In 1903 he led an expedition to Popayán, Colombia, and passed through most of the provinces of Ecuador, in a search for orchids. He died reportedly of drowning in the Timbique River but his obituarist Kränzlin noted that it was not known if it was by "an unhappy accident or by malice".

== Family ==
Lehmann married Maria Josefa de Mosquera in Colombia and settled in Popayan. His grandson, Federico Carlos Lehmann Valencia (1914–1974), was a Colombian ornithologist.

== Legacy ==
Friedrich Carl Lehmann is commemorated in the scientific name of a species of snake, Atractus lehmanni, which is native to Colombia and Ecuador. Also, in 1895, botanist Ernest Friedrich Gilg published a genus of flowering plants from Colombia and Peru (belonging to the family Gentianaceae) as Lehmanniella in his honour.
