= Alopoglossus meloi =

Scientific classification
- Kingdom: Animalia
- Phylum: Chordata
- Class: Reptilia
- Order: Squamata
- Family: Alopoglossidae
- Genus: Alopoglossus
- Species: A. meloi

Binomial name
- Alopoglossus meloi Ribeiro-Júnior, 2018

Species of lizard

Alopoglossus meloi is a species of lizard in the family Alopoglossidae. The species is endemic to northern Brazil.

== Etymology ==
The specific name, meloi, is in honor of André Renato de Melo Teixeira.

== Geographic range ==
A. meloi is found in the state of Pará, Brazil.

== Habitat ==
The preferred habitat of A. meloi is leaf litter in relatively open, dry forest.
