= Danacetichthys =

Danacetichthys galathenus

Conservation status
- Data Deficient (IUCN 3.1)

Scientific classification
- Kingdom: Animalia
- Phylum: Chordata
- Class: Actinopterygii
- Order: Beryciformes
- Family: Cetomimidae
- Genus: Danacetichthys; Paxton, 1989
- Species: D. galathenus

Binomial name
- Danacetichthys galathenus Paxton, 1989

Species of fish

Danacetichthys galathenus (common name Young whalefish) is a species of flabby whalefish found in the ocean depths at around 1,330 metres (4,360 ft). This species grows to a length of 5.4 centimetres (2.1 in) SL.

Both the genus and the species were first described in 1989 by John Paxton. D. galathenus is the only species in this genus.
