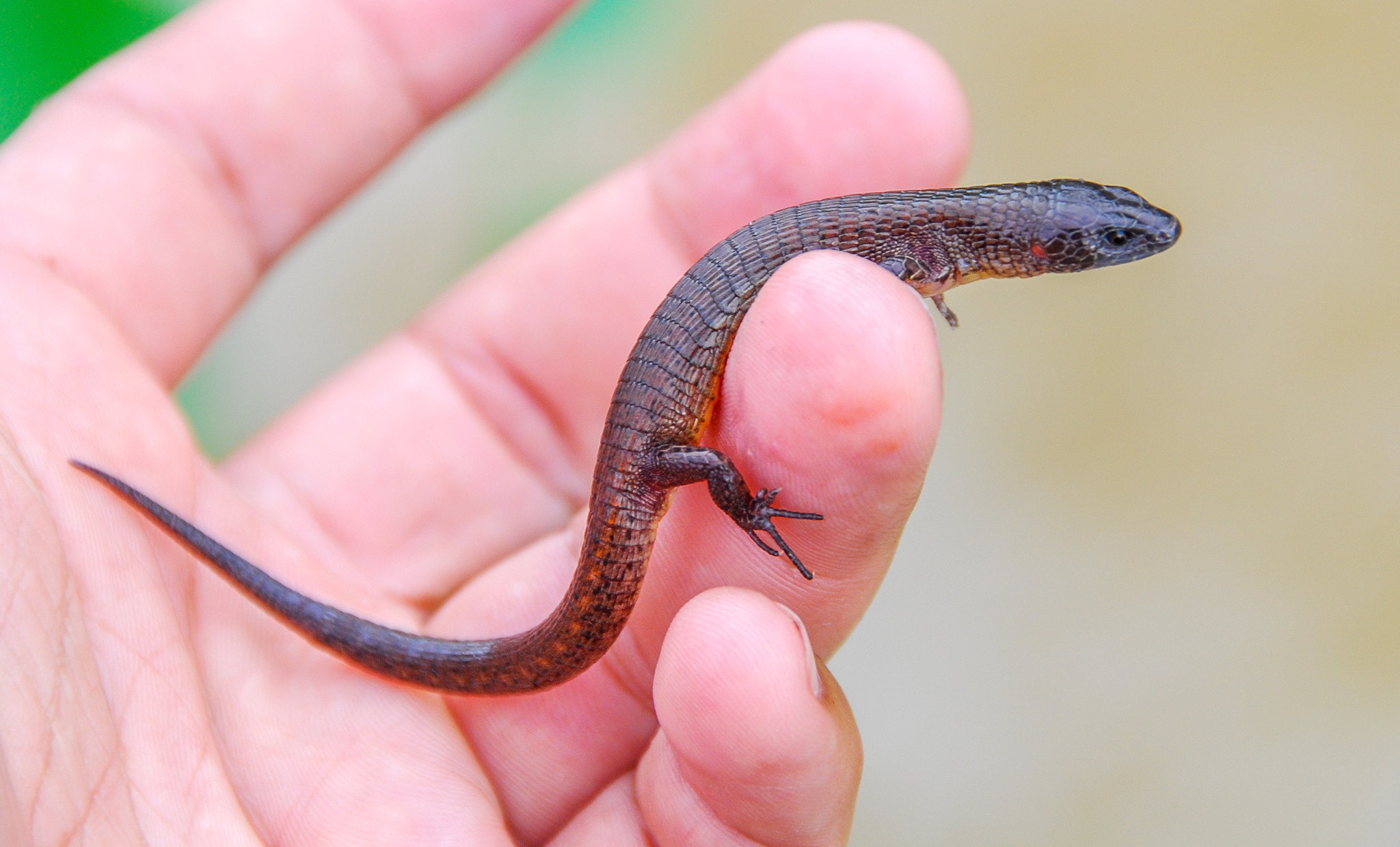

Conservation status
- Least Concern (IUCN 3.1)

Scientific classification
- Kingdom: Animalia
- Phylum: Chordata
- Class: Reptilia
- Order: Squamata
- Family: Alopoglossidae
- Genus: Alopoglossus
- Species: A. brevifrontalis

Binomial name
- Alopoglossus brevifrontalis (Boulenger, 1912)

Synonyms
- Ptychoglossus brevifrontalis Boulenger, 1912; Anadia nicefori Loveridge, 1929; Ptychoglossus nicefori (Loveridge, 1929)

= Alopoglossus brevifrontalis =

Species of lizard

Alopoglossus brevifrontalis, also known commonly as Boulenger's largescale lizard, is a species of lizard in the family Alopoglossidae. The species is native to northern South America.

== Geographic distribution ==
Alopoglossus brevifrontalis is found in Bolivia, Brazil, Colombia, Ecuador, French Guiana, Guyana, Peru, Suriname, and Venezuela.

== Habitat ==
The preferred natural habitat of Alopoglossus brevifrontalis is forest, at elevations of 120–1,000 m (390–3,280 ft).

== As prey ==
Alopoglossus brevifrontalis is preyed upon by the snake Taeniophallus brevirostris.

== Reproduction ==
Alopoglossus brevifrontalis is oviparous. Clutch size is two eggs.

== Etymology ==
The specific name of the synonym, nicefori, is in honor of missionary Brother Nicéforo María, born Antoine Rouhaire in France, who established a natural history museum in Medellín, Colombia.
