= Cetomimoides =

Scientific classification
- Kingdom: Animalia
- Phylum: Chordata
- Class: Actinopterygii
- Order: Beryciformes
- Family: Cetomimidae
- Genus: Cetomimoides; Koefoed, 1955
- Species: C. parri

Binomial name
- Cetomimoides parri Koefoed, 1955

Species of fish

Cetomimoides parri is a species of fish in the family Cetomimidae found in the Pacific Ocean in the vicinity of the Philippines. This species grows to a length of 3.7 centimetres (1.5 in) SL.
