= Alopoglossus copii =

Conservation status
- Least Concern (IUCN 3.1)

Scientific classification
- Kingdom: Animalia
- Phylum: Chordata
- Class: Reptilia
- Order: Squamata
- Family: Alopoglossidae
- Genus: Alopoglossus
- Species: A. copii

Binomial name
- Alopoglossus copii Boulenger, 1885

Species of lizard

Alopoglossus copii, known commonly as the drab shade lizard, is a species of lizard in the family Alopoglossidae. The species is native to northwestern South America.

== Etymology ==
The specific name, copii, is in honor of American herpetologist Edward Drinker Cope.

== Geographic range ==
A. copii is found in Colombia, Ecuador, and Peru.

== Habitat ==
The preferred habitat of A. copii is forest at altitudes of 310–1,390 m (1,020–4,560 ft).

== Reproduction ==
A. copii is oviparous.
