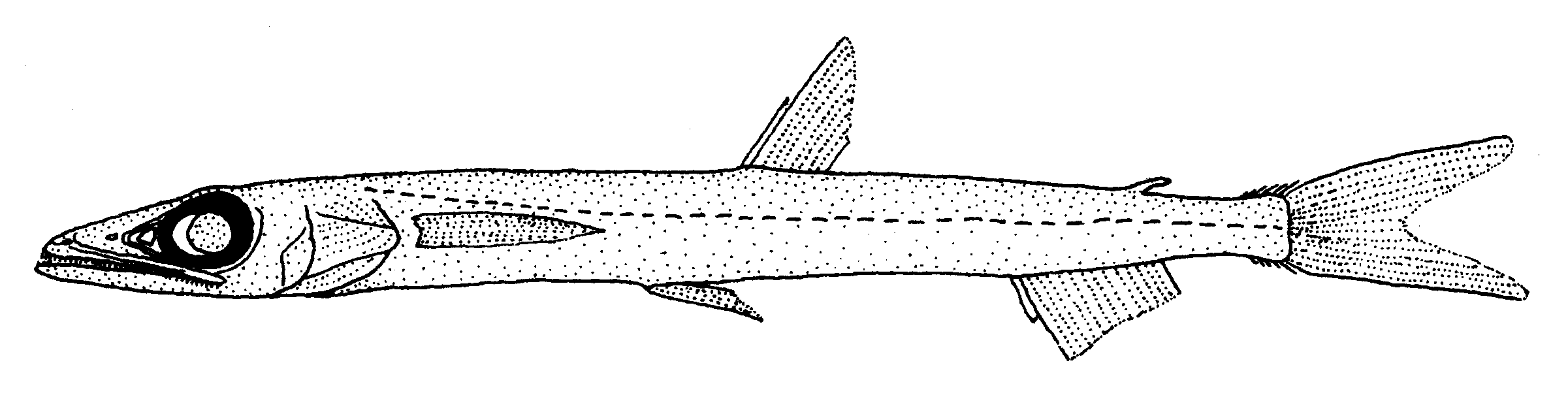
- Ahlstrom's Waryfish (S. ahlstromi)

Scientific classification
- Kingdom: Animalia
- Phylum: Chordata
- Class: Actinopterygii
- Order: Aulopiformes
- Family: Notosudidae
- Genus: Scopelosaurus; Bleeker, 1860

= Scopelosaurus =

Genus of fishes

Scopelosaurus is a genus of waryfishes.

The generic name is from the Greek words σκόπελος (skopelos, "lanternfish") and σαῦρος (sauros, "horse mackerel").

== Species ==
There are currently 14 recognized species in this genus:

- Scopelosaurus adleri (Fedorov, 1967)
- Scopelosaurus ahlstromi Bertelsen, G. Krefft & N. B. Marshall, 1976 (Ahlstrom's waryfish)
- Scopelosaurus argenteus Maul, 1954 (Waryfish)
- Scopelosaurus craddocki Bertelsen, G. Krefft & N. B. Marshall, 1976
- Scopelosaurus gibbsi Bertelsen, G. Krefft & N. B. Marshall, 1976
- Scopelosaurus hamiltoni Waite, 1916 (Smallscale waryfish)
- Scopelosaurus harryi Mead, 1953 (Scaly paperbone)
- Scopelosaurus herwigi Bertelsen, G. Krefft & N. B. Marshall, 1976
- Scopelosaurus hoedti Bleeker, 1860 (Hoedt's waryfish)
- Scopelosaurus hubbsi Bertelsen, G. Krefft & N. B. Marshall, 1976
- Scopelosaurus lepidus G. Krefft & Maul, 1955 (Blackfin waryfish)
- Scopelosaurus mauli Bertelsen, G. Krefft & N. B. Marshall, 1976 (Maul's waryfish)
- Scopelosaurus meadi Bertelsen, G. Krefft & N. B. Marshall, 1976 (Blackring waryfish)
- Scopelosaurus smithii B. A. Bean, 1925
