= Federico Carlos Lehmann =

Colombian ornithologist, plant collector and conservation biologist

- Born: March 23, 1914; Popayán, Colombia
- Died: 1974
- Education: University of Cauca
- Relatives: Friedrich Carl Lehmann (grandfather)

Federico Carlos Lehmann Valencia (March 23, 1914 – 1974) was a Colombian ornithologist, plant collector, and conservation biologist.

== Early years ==
Lehmann Valencia was born in the city of Popayán, in Cauca, Colombia. His grandfather, Friedrich Carl Lehmann, a Colombia-based German explorer, had died while crossing the Río Timbiqui; his father, Federico Carlos Lehmann Mosquera was widowed when his son was born, and Lehmann Valencia was largely brought up by his grandmother who encouraged his interest in geography and natural history. Lehmann Valencia studied at the University of Cauca in Popayán from 1929 to 1934.

== Career ==
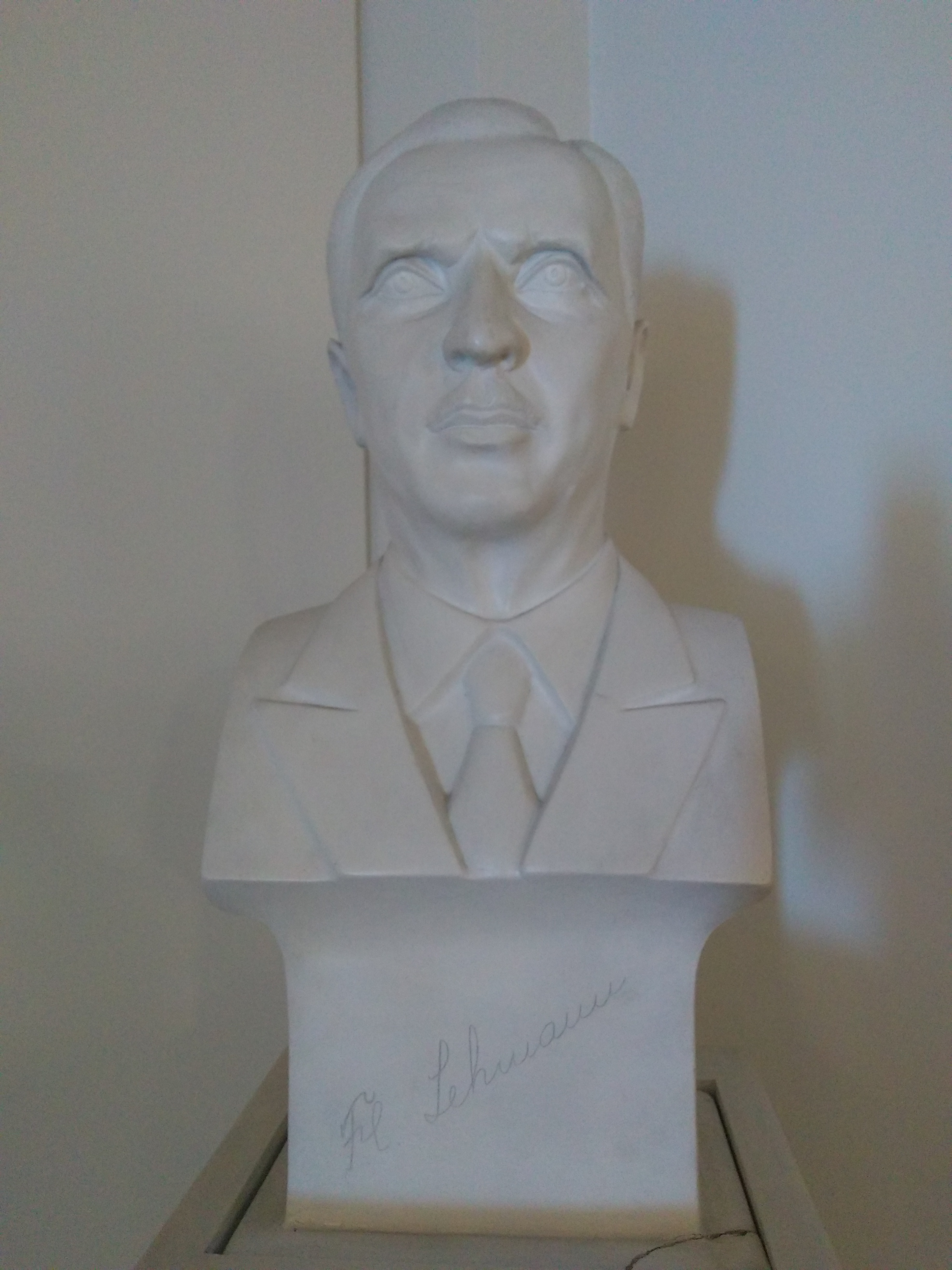
Bust of Federico Lehmann at the Museum of Natural Sciences in Cali

In 1938 Lehmann Valencia accepted a job in the Institute of Botany at the National University of Colombia in Bogotá. There he was put in charge of the collection of animal specimens, travelling throughout the country to build up the collection, and becoming increasingly interested in ornithology and in environmental protection. He became involved with the International Council for Bird Preservation (now BirdLife International) and during the 1940s and 1950s worked to promote conservation legislation.

From 1956 to 1961 Lehmann Valencia was the assessor of natural resources for the Ministry of Agriculture in the departments of Valle and Cauca, his work leading to the creation of new protected areas, the Laguna de Sonso Nature Reserve, the Farallones de Cali National Natural Park, the Puracé National Natural Park, and the Los Nevados National Natural Park. He also took part in a project at the University of Valle in Cali, collecting and classifying the birds of western Colombia. In 1963 he founded the departmental Museum of Natural Sciences in Cali which was named after him after his death in 1974.

== Legacy ==
Lehmann Valencia is commemorated in the scientific name of a species of lizard, Alopoglossus lehmanni, which is endemic to Colombia. He is also commemorated in the names of three species of frogs: Eleutherodactylus lehmanvalenciae (junior synonym of Pristimantis moro), Hyloxalus lehmanni, and Oophaga lehmanni (Lehmann's poison frog).

== Personal life ==
He married Ana Luisa Olano Arboleda. Together they had three children.
