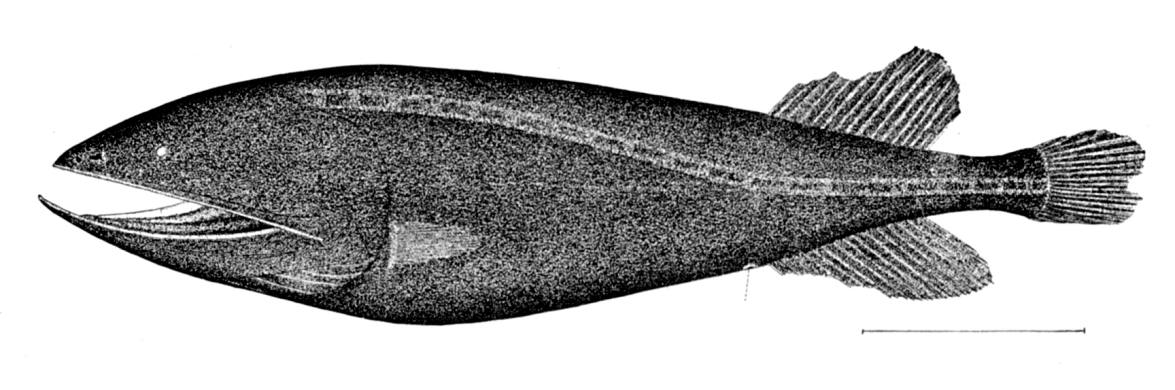
- C. gillii

Scientific classification
- Kingdom: Animalia
- Phylum: Chordata
- Class: Actinopterygii
- Order: Beryciformes
- Family: Cetomimidae
- Genus: Cetomimus; Goode & T. H. Bean, 1895

= Cetomimus =

Genus of fishes

Cetomimus is a genus of flabby whalefishes.

== Species ==
There are currently seven recognized species in this genus:

- Cetomimus compunctus T. Abe, Marumo & Kawaguchi, 1965
- Cetomimus craneae Harry, 1952
- Cetomimus gillii Goode & T. H. Bean, 1895
- Cetomimus hempeli Maul, 1969
- Cetomimus kerdops A. E. Parr, 1934
- Cetomimus paxtoni Kobyliansky, Gordeeva & Mishin 2023
- Cetomimus picklei (Gilchrist, 1922)
- Cetomimus teevani Harry, 1952

== See also ==
Video of a whalefish from Monterey Bay Aquarium Research Institute.
