= Cetostoma =

Conservation status
- Data Deficient (IUCN 3.1)

Scientific classification
- Kingdom: Animalia
- Phylum: Chordata
- Class: Actinopterygii
- Order: Beryciformes
- Family: Cetomimidae
- Genus: Cetostoma; Zugmayer, 1914
- Species: C. regani

Binomial name
- Cetostoma regani Zugmayer, 1914

Species of fish

Cetostoma regani, the pink flabby whalefish, is a species of fish in the family Cetomimidae found in the ocean depths down to 2,250 metres (7,380 ft).

This species grows to a length of 24.7 centimetres (9.7 in) SL.

== Etymology ==
The fish is named in honor of English ichthyologist Charles Tate Regan (1878–1943), of the Natural History Museum in London.
