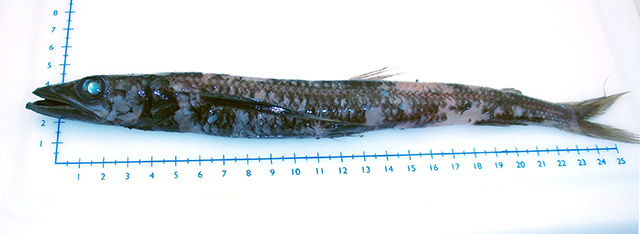

Conservation status
- Least Concern (IUCN 3.1)

Scientific classification
- Kingdom: Animalia
- Phylum: Chordata
- Class: Actinopterygii
- Order: Aulopiformes
- Family: Notosudidae
- Genus: Scopelosaurus
- Species: S. lepidus

Binomial name
- Scopelosaurus lepidus (Krefft & Maul, 1955)

Synonyms
- Notosudis lepida Krefft & Maul, 1955

= Blackfin waryfish =

Species of fish

The blackfin waryfish (Scopelosaurus lepidus) is a species of fish in the family Notosudidae (waryfish).

== Description ==
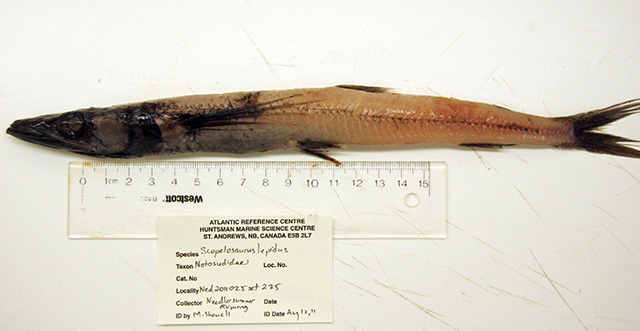
Dorsal view, with black fins visible.

The blackfin waryfish is pinkish black in colour, with the pectoral fins having a large black patch covering their basal two-thirds and a white distal stripe. It has a maximum length of 36.4 cm (14.3 in) and 59 or 60 vertebrae.

== Habitat ==
The blackfin waryfish lives in the North Atlantic Ocean. It is benthopelagic and oceanodromous, living at depths of 70–2,500 m (230–8,200 ft).

== Behaviour ==
The young feeds on copepods while the adults feed on euphausiids, hyperiids and mesopelagic fish. Spawning occurs in midwater far offshore, including in the Sargasso Sea. It is eaten by Sebastes (ocean perch).
