= Alopoglossus gorgonae =

Conservation status
- Data Deficient (IUCN 3.1)

Scientific classification
- Kingdom: Animalia
- Phylum: Chordata
- Class: Reptilia
- Order: Squamata
- Family: Alopoglossidae
- Genus: Alopoglossus
- Species: A. gorgonae

Binomial name
- Alopoglossus gorgonae Harris, 1994

Synonyms
- Ptychoglossus gorgonae Harris, 1994; Alopoglossus gorgonae — Hernández-Morales et al., 2020

Species of lizard

Alopoglossus gorgonae is a species of lizard in the family Alopoglossidae. The species is native to northwestern South America.

== Etymology ==
The specific name, gorgonae, refers to the type locality, Gorgona Island, Colombia.

== Geographic range ==
A. gorgonae is found in southwestern Colombia and adjacent northwestern Ecuador.

== Habitat ==
The preferred natural habitat of A. gorgonae is forest, at altitudes from sea level to 500 m (1,600 ft).

== Reproduction ==
A. gorgonae is oviparous.
