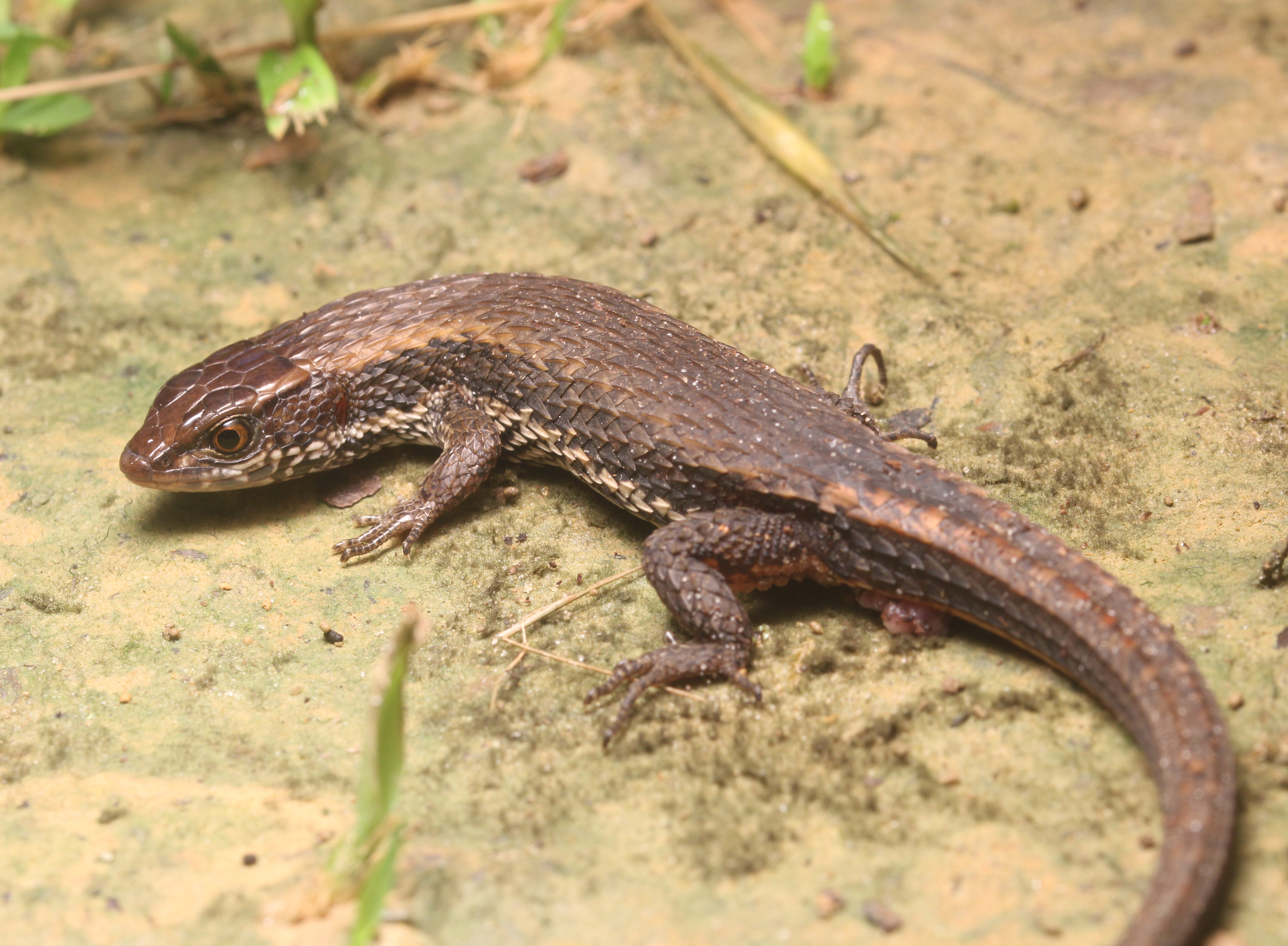

Scientific classification
- Kingdom: Animalia
- Phylum: Chordata
- Class: Reptilia
- Order: Squamata
- Family: Alopoglossidae
- Genus: Alopoglossus
- Species: A. theodorusi

Binomial name
- Alopoglossus theodorusi Ribeiro-Júnior, Meiri, & Fouquet, 2020

= Alopoglossus theodorusi =

Species of lizard

Alopoglossus theodorusi is a species of lizard in the family Alopoglossidae. It is found in the eastern Guiana Shield, in French Guiana and northern Brazil (Amapá state). The specific name honors the herpetologist Theodorus Willem van Lidth de Jeude.

Alopoglossus theodorusi measures 34–60 cm (13.4–23.6 in) in snout–vent length (SVL). The tail in the holotype, an adult female, is 1.65 times SVL.
