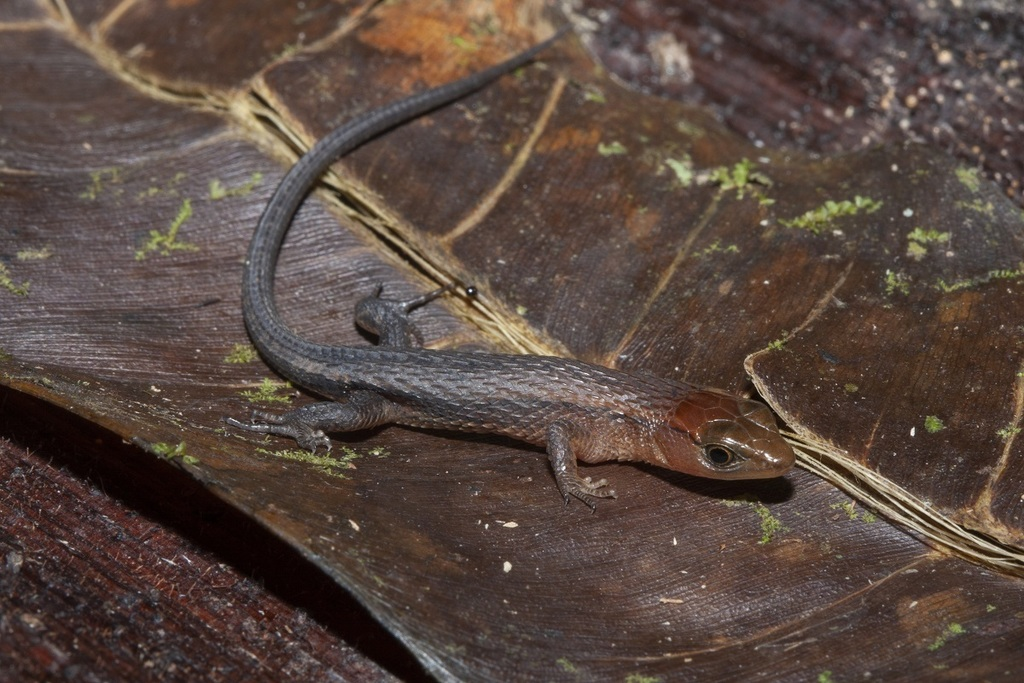

Conservation status
- Least Concern (IUCN 3.1)

Scientific classification
- Kingdom: Animalia
- Phylum: Chordata
- Class: Reptilia
- Order: Squamata
- Family: Alopoglossidae
- Genus: Alopoglossus
- Species: A. atriventris

Binomial name
- Alopoglossus atriventris Duellman, 1973

= Alopoglossus atriventris =

Species of lizard

Alopoglossus atriventris, known commonly as the keel-bellied shade lizard, is a species of lizard in the family Alopoglossidae. The species is endemic to northwestern South America.

== Etymology ==
The specific name, atriventris, is from Latin ater (black) + venter (belly), referring to the black belly of the male.

== Geographic range ==
A. atriventris is found in Brazil (Acre, western Amazonas), Colombia, Ecuador, and Peru.

== Habitat ==
The natural habitat of A. atriventris is lowland tropical forest at altitudes of 130–1,500 m (430–4,920 ft), where it lives in the leaf litter of the forest floor.

== Reproduction ==
A. atriventris is oviparous.
