= Alopoglossus bicolor =

Conservation status
- Least Concern (IUCN 3.1)

Scientific classification
- Kingdom: Animalia
- Phylum: Chordata
- Class: Reptilia
- Order: Squamata
- Family: Alopoglossidae
- Genus: Alopoglossus
- Species: A. bicolor

Binomial name
- Alopoglossus bicolor (Werner, 1916)
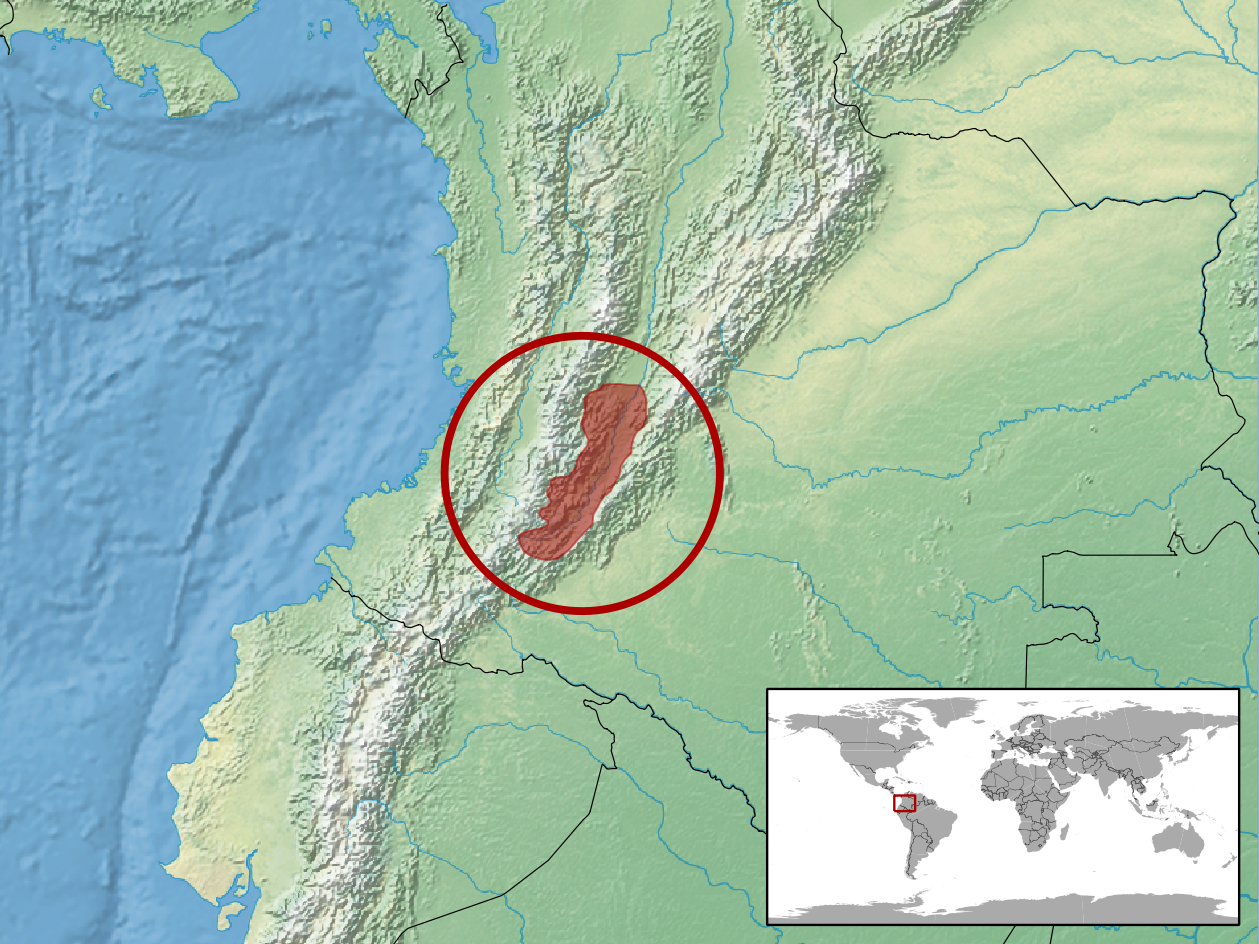

Synonyms
- Ptychoglossus bicolor

Species of lizard

Alopoglossus bicolor, Werner's largescale lizard, is a species of lizard in the family Alopoglossidae. It is endemic to Colombia.
