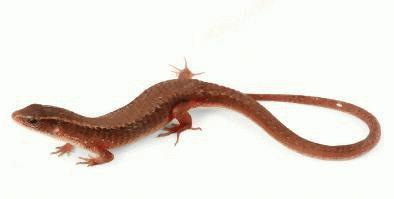

Conservation status
- Least Concern (IUCN 3.1)

Scientific classification
- Kingdom: Animalia
- Phylum: Chordata
- Class: Reptilia
- Order: Squamata
- Family: Alopoglossidae
- Genus: Alopoglossus
- Species: A. festae

Binomial name
- Alopoglossus festae (Peracca, 1896)

Synonyms
- Diastemalepis festae Peracca, 1896; Ptychoglossus festae — J. Peters & Donoso-Barros, 1970; Alopoglossus festae — Hernández-Morales et al., 2020

= Alopoglossus festae =

Species of lizard

Alopoglossus festae is a species of lizard in the family Alopoglossidae. The species is native to northwestern South America.

== Etymology ==
The specific name, festae, is in honor of Italian zoologist Enrico Festa.

== Geographic range ==
A. festae is found in southwestern Colombia and adjacent northwestern Ecuador.

== Habitat ==
The preferred habitat of A. festae is forest at altitudes of 10–2,000 m (33–6,562 ft).

== Reproduction ==
A. festae is oviparous.
