= Alopoglossus avilapiresae =

Scientific classification
- Domain: Eukaryota
- Kingdom: Animalia
- Phylum: Chordata
- Class: Reptilia
- Order: Squamata
- Family: Alopoglossidae
- Genus: Alopoglossus
- Species: A. avilapiresae

Binomial name
- Alopoglossus avilapiresae Ribeiro Jr., Choueri, Lobos, Venegas, Torres-Carvajal, & Werneck, 2020

Species of lizard

Alopoglossus avilapiresae is a species of lizard in the family Alopoglossidae. It is found in Brazil, Colombia, and Peru.
