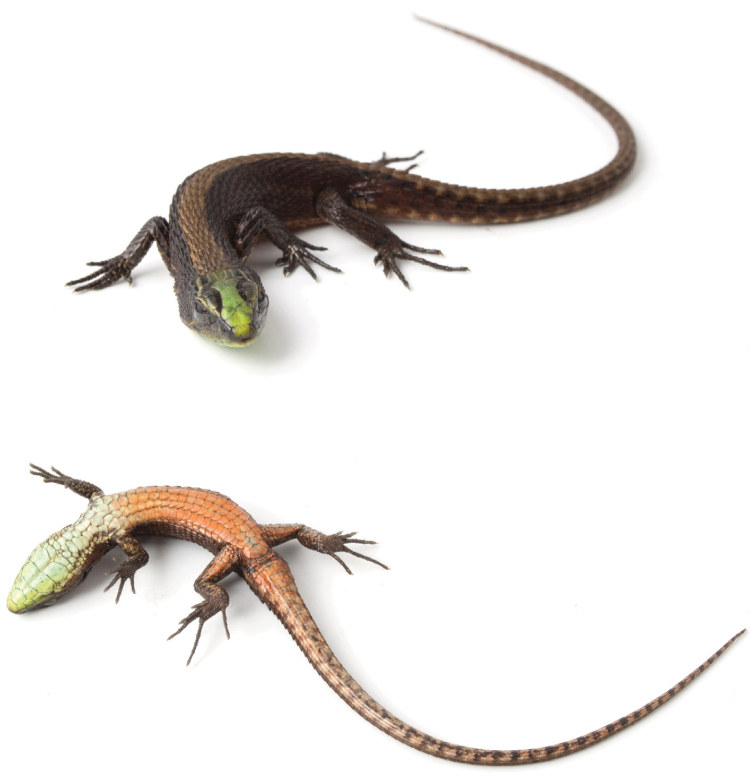

Scientific classification
- Kingdom: Animalia
- Phylum: Chordata
- Class: Reptilia
- Order: Squamata
- Family: Alopoglossidae
- Genus: Alopoglossus
- Species: A. viridiceps

Binomial name
- Alopoglossus viridiceps Torres-Carvajal & Lobos, 2014

= Alopoglossus viridiceps =

Species of lizard

Alopoglossus viridiceps, known commonly as the green-headed shade lizard, is a species of lizard in the family Alopoglossidae. The species is endemic to Ecuador.

== Etymology ==
The specific name, viridiceps, is from Latin viridis (green) + ceps (head), referring to the green coloration of the head, both dorsally and ventrally.

== Geographic range ==
A. viridisceps is found in the Andes of Ecuador in Pichincha Province.
