= Ataxolepis =

Scientific classification
- Kingdom: Animalia
- Phylum: Chordata
- Class: Actinopterygii
- Order: Beryciformes
- Family: Cetomimidae
- Genus: Ataxolepis; G. S. Myers & Freihofer, 1966

Genus of fishes

Ataxolepis is a genus of flabby whalefishes found in the Pacific Ocean.

== Species ==
There are currently two recognized species in this genus:

- Ataxolepis apus G. S. Myers & Freihofer, 1966
- Ataxolepis henactis Goodyear, 1970
