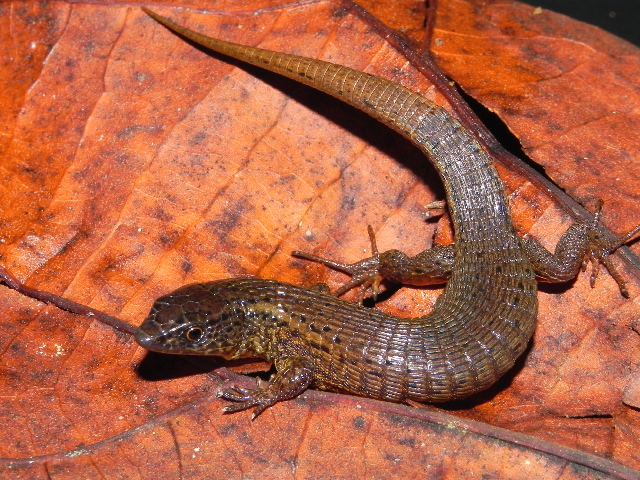

Conservation status
- Least Concern (IUCN 3.1)

Scientific classification
- Kingdom: Animalia
- Phylum: Chordata
- Class: Reptilia
- Order: Squamata
- Family: Alopoglossidae
- Genus: Alopoglossus
- Species: A. vallensis

Binomial name
- Alopoglossus vallensis Harris, 1994

Synonyms
- Ptychoglossus vallensis

= Alopoglossus vallensis =

Species of reptile

Alopoglossus vallensis is a species of lizard in the family Alopoglossidae. It is endemic to Colombia.
