= Alopoglossus andeanus =

Scientific classification
- Kingdom: Animalia
- Phylum: Chordata
- Class: Reptilia
- Order: Squamata
- Family: Alopoglossidae
- Genus: Alopoglossus
- Species: A. andeanus

Binomial name
- Alopoglossus andeanus (Ruibal, 1952)

Species of lizard

Alopoglossus andeanus is a species of lizard in the family Alopoglossidae. It is endemic to Peru.
