= Luciosudis =

Conservation status
- Least Concern (IUCN 3.1)

Scientific classification
- Kingdom: Animalia
- Phylum: Chordata
- Class: Actinopterygii
- Order: Aulopiformes
- Family: Notosudidae
- Genus: Luciosudis; Fraser-Brunner, 1931
- Species: L. normani

Binomial name
- Luciosudis normani Fraser-Brunner, 1931

Genus of fishes

Luciosudis normani, the paperbones, is a species of waryfish found in the ocean depths from 500 to 800 metres (1,600 to 2,600 ft). This species grows to a length of 20.7 centimetres (8.1 in) SL. This species is the only known member of its genus.
