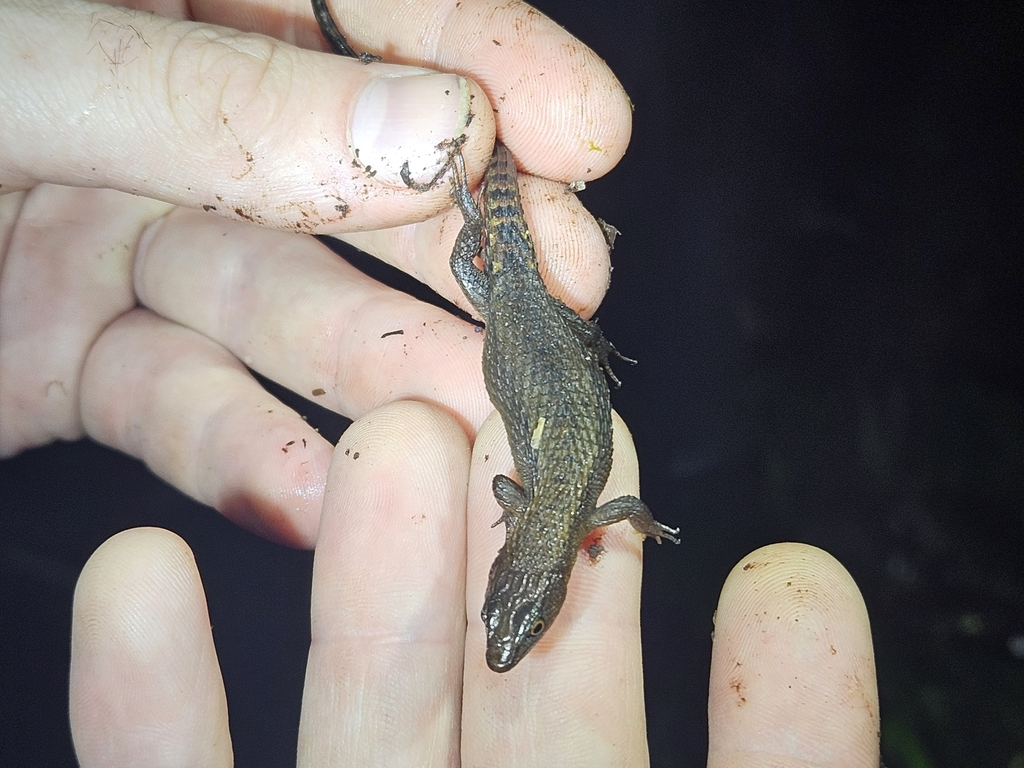

Conservation status
- Least Concern (IUCN 3.1)

Scientific classification
- Kingdom: Animalia
- Phylum: Chordata
- Class: Reptilia
- Order: Squamata
- Family: Alopoglossidae
- Genus: Alopoglossus
- Species: A. buckleyi

Binomial name
- Alopoglossus buckleyi (O'Shaughnessy, 1881)

Synonyms
- Leposoma buckleyi O'Shaughnessy, 1881; Alopoglossus buckleyi — Boulenger, 1885

= Alopoglossus buckleyi =

Species of lizard

Alopoglossus buckleyi, also known commonly as Buckley's shade lizard and Buckley's teiid, is a species of lizard in the family Alopoglossidae. The species is native to northwestern South America.

== Etymology ==
The specific name, buckleyi, is in honor of Clarence Buckley (1839–1889) who collected the holotype.

== Geographic range ==
A. buckleyi is found in Brazil (Amazonas, Acre), Colombia (Amazonas), eastern Ecuador, and eastern Peru (Loreto).

== Habitat ==
The natural habitat of A. buckleyi is forest at altitudes of 230–1,830 m (750–6,000 ft).

== Description ==
A. buckleyi is a small species of lizard. The holotype has a snout-to-vent length (SVL) of 5.1 cm (2.0 in).

== Reproduction ==
A. buckleyi is oviparous.
