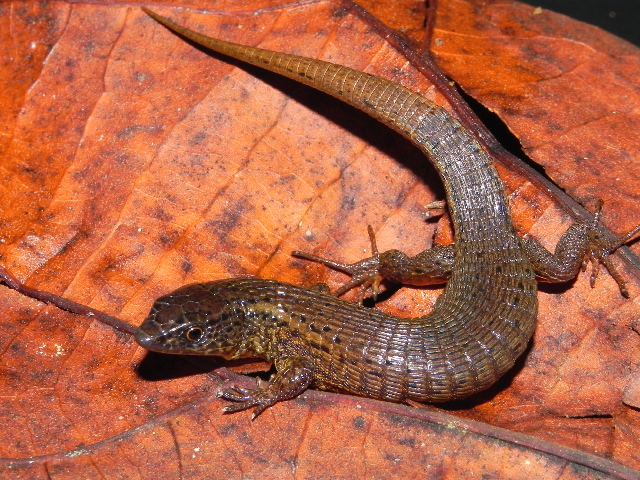
- Alopoglossus vallensis

Scientific classification
- Kingdom: Animalia
- Phylum: Chordata
- Class: Reptilia
- Order: Squamata
- Superfamily: Gymnophthalmoidea
- Family: Alopoglossidae; Goicoechea et al., 2016
- Genus: Alopoglossus; Boulenger, 1885

Species
- 32, see text.

Synonyms
- Ptychoglossus Boulenger, 1890

= Alopoglossus =

Genus of lizards

Alopoglossus is a genus of lizards in the monogeneric family Alopoglossidae. The genus is distributed from Costa Rica in Central America to northern South America.

== Species ==
The genus Alopoglossus contains the following 32 valid species:

- Alopoglossus amazonius Ruthven, 1924 – Amazonanian teiid
- Alopoglossus andeanus (Ruibal, 1952)
- Alopoglossus angulatus (Linnaeus, 1758) – northern teiid
- Alopoglossus atriventris Duellman, 1973 – keel-bellied shade lizard
- Alopoglossus avilapiresae Ribeiro-Júnior, Choueri, Lobos, Venegas, Torres-Carvajal & Werneck, 2020
- Alopoglossus bicolor (F. Werner, 1916) – Werner's largescale lizard
- Alopoglossus bilineatus Boulenger, 1890
- Alopoglossus brevifrontalis Boulenger, 1912 – Boulenger's largescale lizard
- Alopoglossus buckleyi (O’Shaughnessy, 1881) – Buckley's teiid
- Alopoglossus carinicaudatus (Cope, 1876) – northern teiid
- Alopoglossus collii Ribeiro-Júnior, Choueri, Lobos, Venegas, Torres-Carvajal & Werneck, 2020
- Alopoglossus copii Boulenger, 1885 – drab shade lizard
- Alopoglossus danieli Harris, 1994 – Daniel's largescale lizard
- Alopoglossus embera Peloso & Morales, 2017
- Alopoglossus eurylepis Harris & Rueda, 1985 – largescale lizard
- Alopoglossus festae (Peracca, 1896)
- Alopoglossus gansorum Ribeiro‐Júnior, Sánchez‐Martínez, Moraes, Oliveira, Carvalho, Choueri, Werneck & Meiri, 2021
- Alopoglossus gorgonae Harris, 1994
- Alopoglossus grandisquamatus Rueda, 1985 – common largescale lizard
- Alopoglossus harrisi Hernández-Morales, Sturaro, Sales-Nunes, Lotzkat & Peloso, 2020
- Alopoglossus indigenorum Ribeiro‐Júnior, Sánchez‐Martínez, Moraes, Oliveira, Carvalho, Choueri, Werneck & Meiri, 2021
- Alopoglossus kugleri Roux, 1927 – Kugler's largescale lizard
- Alopoglossus lehmanni Ayala & Harris, 1984
- Alopoglossus meloi Ribeiro-Júnior, 2018
- Alopoglossus myersi Harris, 1994
- Alopoglossus plicatus (Taylor, 1949) – Taylor's largescale lizard
- Alopoglossus romaleos Harris, 1994
- Alopoglossus stenolepis (Boulenger, 1908)
- Alopoglossus tapajosensis Ribeiro‐Júnior, Sánchez‐Martínez, Moraes, Oliveira, Carvalho, Choueri, Werneck & Meiri, 2021
- Alopoglossus theodorusi Ribeiro-Júnior, Meiri & Fouquet, 2020
- Alopoglossus vallensis Harris, 1994
- Alopoglossus viridiceps Torres-Carvajal & Lobos, 2014 – green-headed shade lizard

Nota bene: A binomial authority in parentheses indicates that the species was originally described in a genus other than Alopoglossus.
