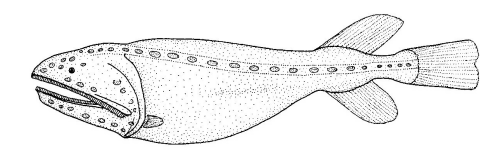
- G. grahami

Scientific classification
- Kingdom: Animalia
- Phylum: Chordata
- Class: Actinopterygii
- Order: Beryciformes
- Family: Cetomimidae
- Genus: Gyrinomimus; A. E. Parr, 1934

Species
- See text.

= Gyrinomimus =

Genus of fishes

Gyrinomimus is a genus of flabby whalefishes.

== Species ==
There are currently five recognized species in this genus:

- Gyrinomimus andriashevi Fedorov, Balushkin & Trunov, 1987
- Gyrinomimus bruuni Rofen, 1959
- Gyrinomimus grahami L. R. Richardson & Garrick, 1964
- Gyrinomimus myersi A. E. Parr, 1934
- Gyrinomimus parri Bigelow, 1961 (Parr's combtooth whalefish)
