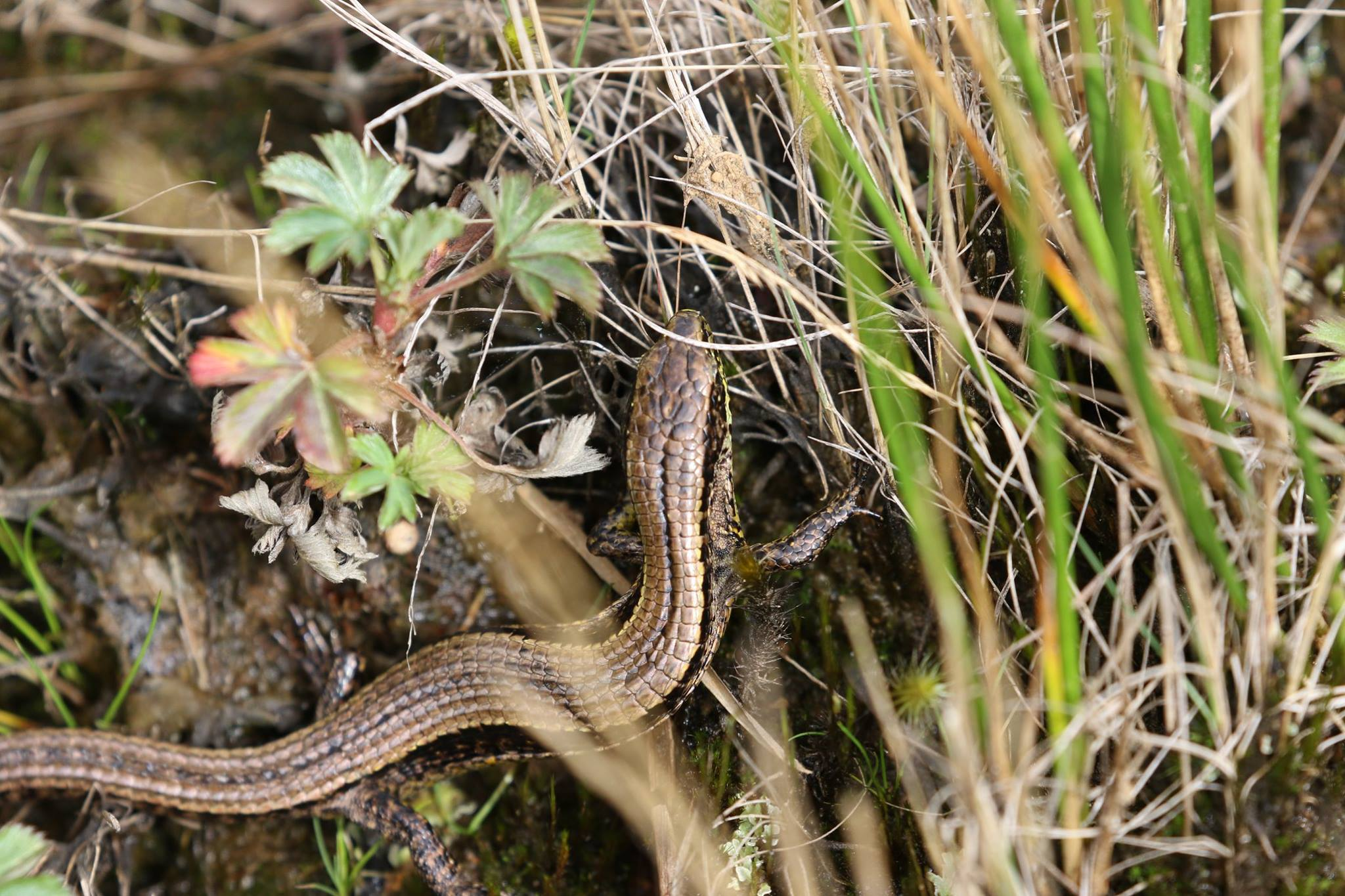

Conservation status
- Least Concern (IUCN 3.1)

Scientific classification
- Domain: Eukaryota
- Kingdom: Animalia
- Phylum: Chordata
- Class: Reptilia
- Order: Squamata
- Family: Alopoglossidae
- Genus: Alopoglossus
- Species: A. plicatus

Binomial name
- Alopoglossus plicatus (Taylor, 1949)

Synonyms
- Ptychoglossus plicatus

= Alopoglossus plicatus =

Species of lizard

Alopoglossus plicatus, Taylor's largescale lizard, is a species of lizard in the family Alopoglossidae. It is found in Costa Rica, Panama, and Colombia.
