= Notocetichthys =

Conservation status
- Data Deficient (IUCN 3.1)

Scientific classification
- Kingdom: Animalia
- Phylum: Chordata
- Class: Actinopterygii
- Order: Beryciformes
- Family: Cetomimidae
- Genus: Notocetichthys; Balushkin, Fedorov & Paxton, 1989
- Species: N. trunovi

Binomial name
- Notocetichthys trunovi Balushkin, Fedorov & Paxton, 1989

Species of fish

Notocetichthys trunovi, Trunov's southern cetomimid, is a species of fish in the family Cetomimidae only known from the Lazarev Sea near Antarctica where it is found at depths of from 1,210 to 1,360 metres (3,970 to 4,460 ft). This species grows to a length of 10.9 centimetres (4.3 in) SL. This species is the only known member of its genus.

== Etymology ==
The fish is named in honor of Russian ichthyologist Ivan Andreevich Trunov, of the Atlantic Research Institute of Fisheries and Oceanography, who was the one who collected the two type specimens.
