= Alopoglossus amazonius =

Scientific classification
- Domain: Eukaryota
- Kingdom: Animalia
- Phylum: Chordata
- Class: Reptilia
- Order: Squamata
- Family: Alopoglossidae
- Genus: Alopoglossus
- Species: A. amazonius

Binomial name
- Alopoglossus amazonius Ruthven, 1924

Synonyms
- Pantodactylus amazonius

Species of lizard

Alopoglossus amazonius, the Amazonanian teiid, is a species of lizard in the family Alopoglossidae. It is endemic to Brazil.
