= Alopoglossus myersi =

Conservation status
- Least Concern (IUCN 3.1)

Scientific classification
- Kingdom: Animalia
- Phylum: Chordata
- Class: Reptilia
- Order: Squamata
- Family: Alopoglossidae
- Genus: Alopoglossus
- Species: A. myersi

Binomial name
- Alopoglossus myersi (Harris, 1994)

Synonyms
- Ptychoglossus myersi Harris, 1994

Species of lizard

Alopoglossus myersi is a species of lizard in the family Alopoglossidae. The species is native to southern Central America and northern South America.

== Etymology ==
The specific name, myersi, is in honor of American herpetoloist Charles William Myers.

== Geographic distribution ==
Alopoglossus myersi is found in Panama, Colombia, and Venezuela.

== Habitat ==
The preferred natural habitat of Alopoglossus myersi is forest, at elevations of 800–1,300 m (2,600–4,300 ft).

== Behavior ==
Alopoglossus myersi is diurnal and terrestrial, foraging in the leaf litter of the forest.

== Reproduction ==
Alopoglossus myersi is oviparous.
