= Alopoglossus grandisquamatus =

Conservation status
- Data Deficient (IUCN 3.1)

Scientific classification
- Kingdom: Animalia
- Phylum: Chordata
- Class: Reptilia
- Order: Squamata
- Family: Alopoglossidae
- Genus: Alopoglossus
- Species: A. grandisquamatus

Binomial name
- Alopoglossus grandisquamatus Rueda-Almonacid, 1985

Synonyms
- Ptychoglossus grandisquamatus

Species of lizard

Alopoglossus grandisquamatus, the common largescale lizard, is a species of lizard in the family Alopoglossidae. It is endemic to Colombia.
