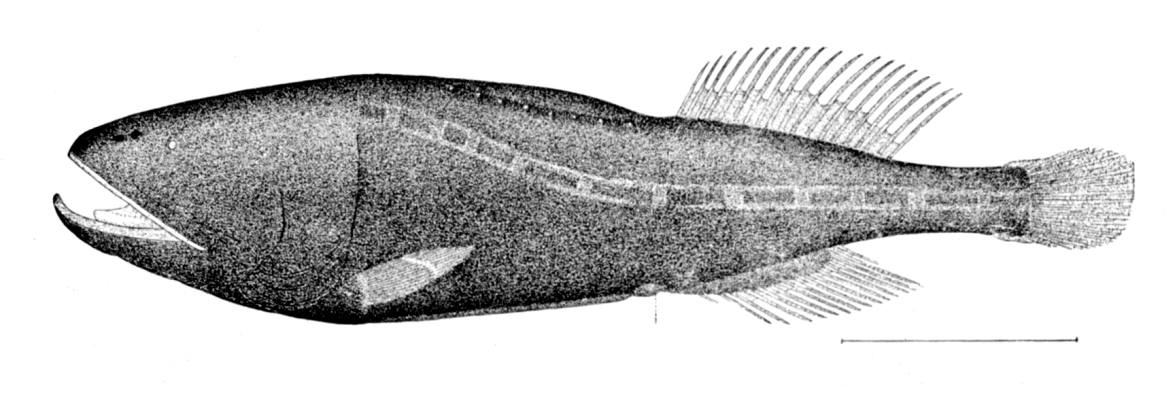

Conservation status
- Data Deficient (IUCN 3.1)

Scientific classification
- Kingdom: Animalia
- Phylum: Chordata
- Class: Actinopterygii
- Order: Beryciformes
- Family: Cetomimidae
- Genus: Ditropichthys; A. E. Parr, 1934
- Species: D. storeri

Binomial name
- Ditropichthys storeri (Goode & T. H. Bean, 1895)

= Ditropichthys =

Species of fish

Ditropichthys storeri is a species of fish in the family Cetomimidae found in the deep oceans at depths of from 650 to 3,400 metres (2,130 to 11,150 ft). This species grows to a length of 12.8 centimetres (5.0 in) SL.
