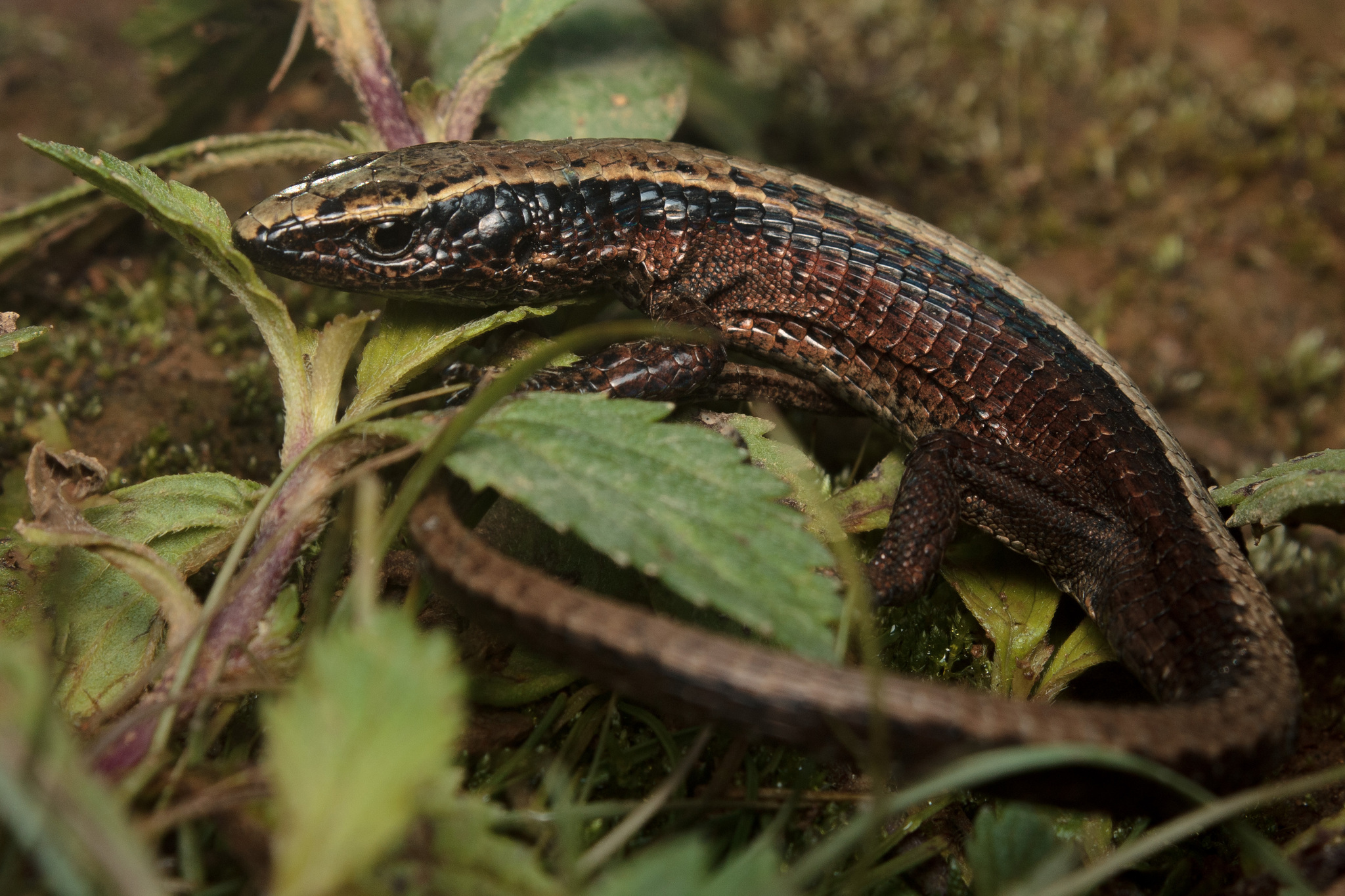

Conservation status
- Data Deficient (IUCN 3.1)

Scientific classification
- Kingdom: Animalia
- Phylum: Chordata
- Class: Reptilia
- Order: Squamata
- Family: Alopoglossidae
- Genus: Alopoglossus
- Species: A. romaleos

Binomial name
- Alopoglossus romaleos Harris, 1994

Synonyms
- Ptychoglossus romaleos

= Alopoglossus romaleos =

Species of lizard

Alopoglossus romaleos is a species of lizard in the family Alopoglossidae. It is endemic to Colombia.
