= Alopoglossus embera =

Scientific classification
- Kingdom: Animalia
- Phylum: Chordata
- Class: Reptilia
- Order: Squamata
- Family: Alopoglossidae
- Genus: Alopoglossus
- Species: A. embera

Binomial name
- Alopoglossus embera Peloso & Morales, 2017

Species of lizard

Alopoglossus embera is a species of lizard in the family Alopoglossidae. The species is endemic to western Colombia.

== Etymology ==
The specific name, embera, is in honor of the Emberá, an indigenous people of Colombia and Panama.

== Geographic range ==
In Colombia, A. embra is found in Cauca Department and Valle del Cauca Department.
