= Lehmanniella =

Scientific classification
- Kingdom: Plantae
- Clade: Tracheophytes
- Clade: Angiosperms
- Clade: Eudicots
- Clade: Asterids
- Order: Gentianales
- Family: Gentianaceae
- Genus: Lehmanniella; Gilg

Genus of plants

Lehmanniella is a genus of flowering plants belonging to the family Gentianaceae.

It is native to Colombia and Peru.

The genus name of Lehmanniella is in honour of Friedrich Carl Lehmann (1850–1903), a German Consul to Colombia, mining engineer, amateur botanist and mycologist, and botanical collector. It was first described and published in H.G.A.Engler & K.A.E.Prantl, Nat. Pflanzenfam. Vol.4 (Issue 2) on page 101 in 1895.

Known species, according to Kew:

- Lehmanniella huanucensis J.E.Simonis ex Maas
- Lehmanniella splendens (Hook.) Ewan
