= Alopoglossus lehmanni =

Conservation status
- Critically Endangered (IUCN 3.1)

Scientific classification
- Kingdom: Animalia
- Phylum: Chordata
- Class: Reptilia
- Order: Squamata
- Family: Alopoglossidae
- Genus: Alopoglossus
- Species: A. lehmanni

Binomial name
- Alopoglossus lehmanni Ayala & Harris, 1984

Species of lizard

Alopoglossus lehmanni is a species of lizard in the family Alopoglossidae. The species is endemic to Colombia.

== Etymology ==
The specific name, lehmanni, is in honor of Colombian biologist Federico Carlos Lehmann-Valencia.

== Geographic range ==
A. lehmanni is found in western Colombia, in Valle del Cauca Department.

== Habitat ==
The natural habitat of A. lehmanni is forest. The holotype was collected at an elevation of 30 m (98 ft).

== Reproduction ==
A. lehmanni is oviparous.
