= Procetichthys =

Scientific classification
- Kingdom: Animalia
- Phylum: Chordata
- Class: Actinopterygii
- Order: Beryciformes
- Family: Cetomimidae
- Genus: Procetichthys; Paxton, 1989
- Species: P. kreffti

Binomial name
- Procetichthys kreffti Paxton, 1989

Species of fish

Procetichthys kreffti is a species of fish in the family Cetomimidae found at depths of around 2,200 metres (7,200 ft) in the Atlantic Ocean. It is thought to inhabit the mid Atlantic ridge. It is the only known member of its genus.
