= Alopoglossus harrisi =

Scientific classification
- Kingdom: Animalia
- Phylum: Chordata
- Class: Reptilia
- Order: Squamata
- Family: Alopoglossidae
- Genus: Alopoglossus
- Species: A. harrisi

Binomial name
- Alopoglossus harrisi Hernández-Morales, Sturaro, Sales-Nunes, Lotzkat, & Peloso, 2020

Species of lizard

Alopoglossus harrisi is a species of lizard in the family Alopoglossidae. It is found in Ecuador and Colombia.
