= Alopoglossus bilineatus =

Conservation status
- Data Deficient (IUCN 3.1)

Scientific classification
- Domain: Eukaryota
- Kingdom: Animalia
- Phylum: Chordata
- Class: Reptilia
- Order: Squamata
- Family: Alopoglossidae
- Genus: Alopoglossus
- Species: A. bilineatus

Binomial name
- Alopoglossus bilineatus Boulenger, 1890

Synonyms
- Ptychoglossus bilineatus

Species of lizard

Alopoglossus bilineatus is a species of lizard in the family Alopoglossidae. It is found in Colombia and Ecuador.
