= Rhamphocetichthys =

Conservation status
- Least Concern (IUCN 3.1)

Scientific classification
- Kingdom: Animalia
- Phylum: Chordata
- Class: Actinopterygii
- Order: Beryciformes
- Family: Cetomimidae
- Genus: Rhamphocetichthys; Paxton, 1989
- Species: R. savagei

Binomial name
- Rhamphocetichthys savagei Paxton, 1989

Species of fish

Rhamphocetichthys savagei, Savage's bird-snouted whalefish, is a species of flabby whalefish found at depths of around 2,100 metres (6,900 ft). It is the only known member of its genus.

It was first described in 1989 by John R. Paxton.

== Etymology ==
The fish is named in honor of American herpetologist Jay M. Savage, of the University of Southern California.
