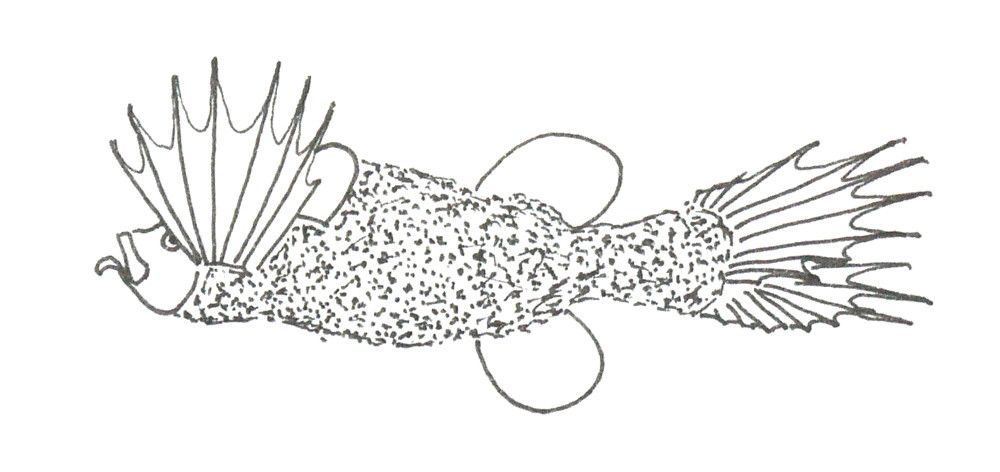
- Artists depiction of Mirapinna

Conservation status
- Data Deficient (IUCN 3.1)

Scientific classification
- Kingdom: Animalia
- Phylum: Chordata
- Class: Actinopterygii
- Order: Beryciformes
- Family: Cetomimidae
- Genus: Mirapinna; Bertelsen & N. B. Marshall, 1956
- Species: M. esau

Binomial name
- Mirapinna esau Bertelsen & N. B. Marshall, 1956

= Mirapinna =

Genus of fish

Mirapinna is a genus of fish in the family Cetomimidae only known from the Atlantic Ocean near the Azores. It was formerly considered a member of the no-longer-recognized family Mirapinnidae, and the only known member of its genus is Mirapinna esau.

== Description ==
Mirapinna esau grows to a length of 5.5 centimetres (2.2 in) total length (TL). Little is known of the fish beyond its appearance. Wheeler (1977) states that only one specimen was caught, near the sea surface, and that it was a copepod feeder. The original specimen was captured north of the Azores at 47°20'North, 22°30'West.

== Etymology ==
The generic name is from the Latin mirus (wonderful) and pinna (thorn), for the unusual fins possessed by this fish. The specific name, Mirapinna esau, is from the Biblical figure Esau, who is stated to have been a very hairy man.
