= Alopoglossus eurylepis =

Conservation status
- Near Threatened (IUCN 3.1)

Scientific classification
- Kingdom: Animalia
- Phylum: Chordata
- Class: Reptilia
- Order: Squamata
- Family: Alopoglossidae
- Genus: Alopoglossus
- Species: A. eurylepis

Binomial name
- Alopoglossus eurylepis Harris & Rueda-Almonacid, 1985

Synonyms
- Ptychoglossus eurylepis

Species of lizard

Alopoglossus eurylepis, the largescale lizard, is a species of lizard in the family Alopoglossidae. It is endemic to Colombia.
