= Alopoglossus carinicaudatus =

Scientific classification
- Domain: Eukaryota
- Kingdom: Animalia
- Phylum: Chordata
- Class: Reptilia
- Order: Squamata
- Family: Alopoglossidae
- Genus: Alopoglossus
- Species: A. carinicaudatus

Binomial name
- Alopoglossus carinicaudatus (Cope, 1876)

Species of lizard

Alopoglossus carinicaudatus, the northern teiid, is a species of lizard in the family Alopoglossidae. It is found in Ecuador and Peru.
