= My Ten Years in a Quandary, and How They Grew =

1936 essay collection by Robert Benchley

My Ten Years in a Quandary, and How They Grew is a 1936 collection of 105 short humorous essays by Robert Benchley. The book was originally published by Harper Brothers and illustrated by Gluyas Williams. It was a best-seller upon release.

== Critical reception ==
The collection is considered one of Benchley's "most brilliant." A reviewer at America wrote, that My Ten Years in a Quandary, and How They Grew is "bristling… with tiny, droll essays on almost every subject imaginable, and inducing in the reader a state of sustained hilarity." Robert van Gelder of the New York Times wrote, "if there is a better bedside book than this it should be beside the couch of Jove." A reviewer at The Baltimore Sun wrote, "I have never been able to find much humor in the writings of Robert Benchley but I must say his latest book, My Ten Years In A Quandary And How They Grew, has caught my fancy and I do not hesitate to recommend it."
