= Takeshi Yamada =

Japanese-American artist and rogue taxidermist

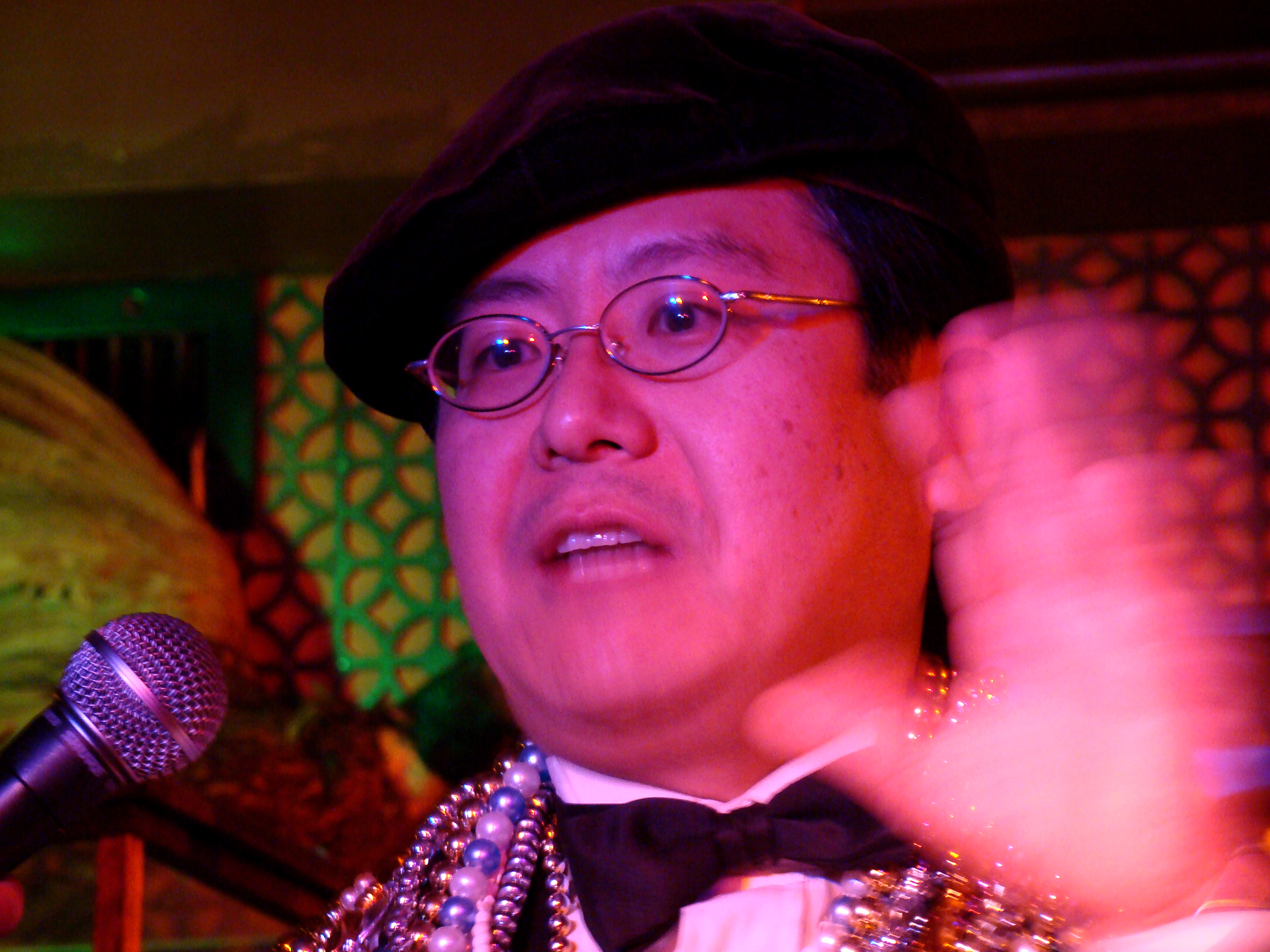
Takeshi Yamada in 2007

Takeshi Yamada is a Japanese-American artist and rogue taxidermist.

Yamada was born Osaka, Japan, in 1960. He began painting at the age of 12, and decided to become an artist at 16. He was an international exchange student at the Osaka University of Arts before moving to the United States in 1983. He studied art at the California College of the Arts and the Maryland Institute College of Art, obtaining his Bachelor of Fine Art degree in 1985. In 1987, he obtained his Master of Fine Art from the University of Michigan School of Art & Design. He had exhibitions at the Neville-Sargent Gallery in Chicago in 1988 and 1991. In 1990, a series of 48 paintings entitled "Divine Comedy: New Orleans Mardi Gras" by Yamada were displayed in the Louisiana State Museum, and later some of them were shown in the Meguro Museum of Art, Tokyo. In 1993, he had a solo exhibition at the Lauren Rogers Museum of Art. He moved to New York City in 2000.

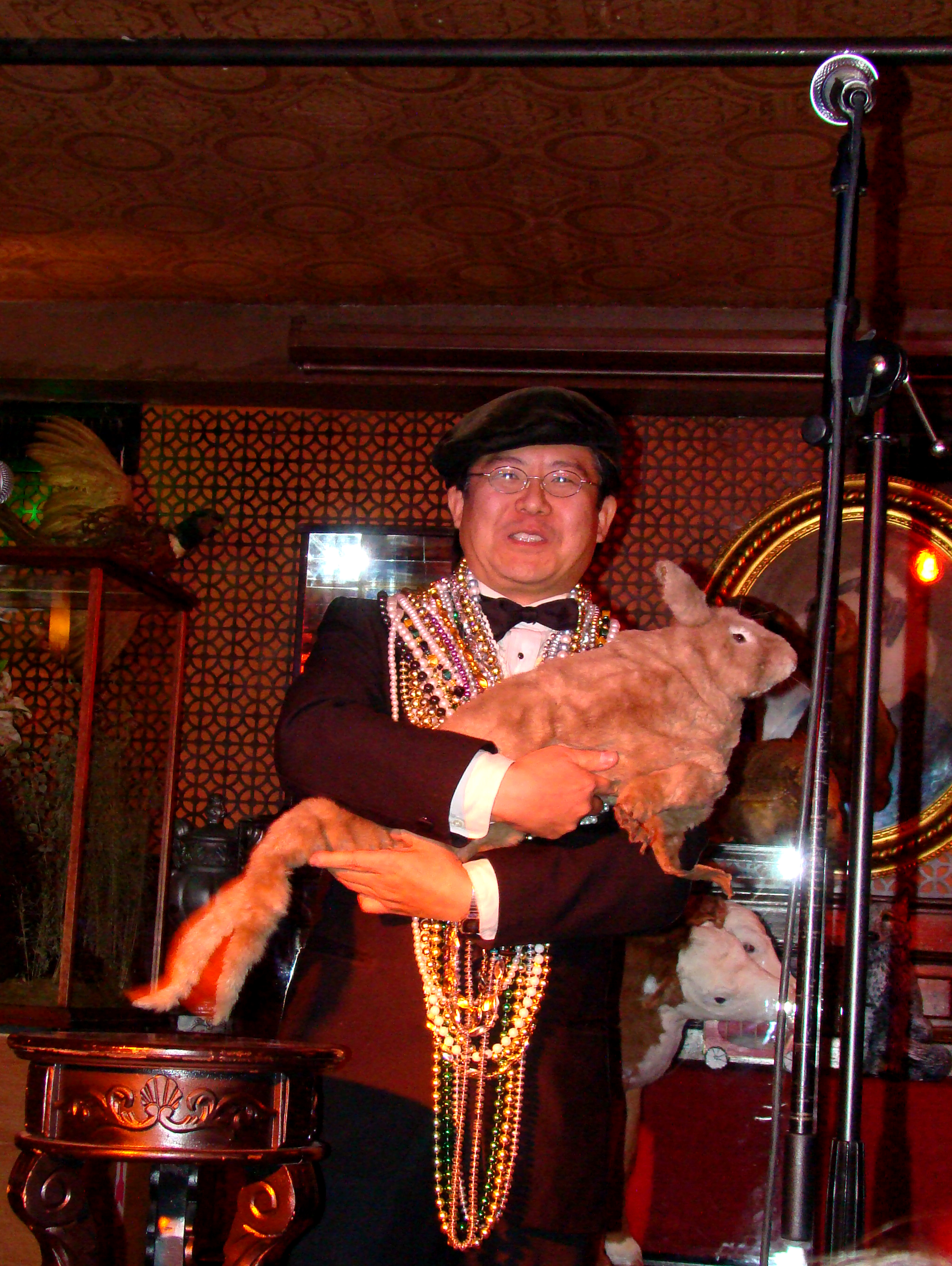
Takeshi Yamada with his "sea rabbit"

Yamada is a rogue taxidermist, creating fake creatures out of organic and inorganic materials. Some of his works have been displayed at the Coney Island Library.
