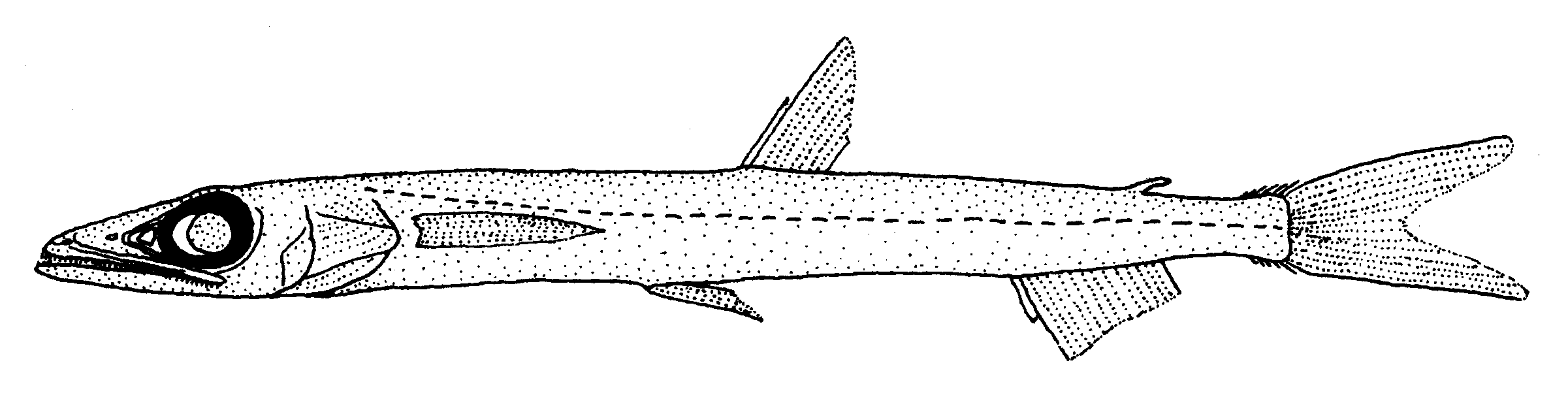
- Scopelosaurus ahlstromi

Scientific classification
- Domain: Eukaryota
- Kingdom: Animalia
- Phylum: Chordata
- Class: Actinopterygii
- Order: Aulopiformes
- Suborder: Chlorophthalmoidei
- Family: Notosudidae

Genera
- Ahliesaurus; Luciosudis; Scopelosaurus

= Notosudidae =

Waryfishes

Family of fishes

Waryfishes are deep-sea aulopiform fishes in the small family Notosudidae. They are thought to have a circumglobal distribution in subarctic to subantarctic waters. The family name Notosudidae derives from the Greek noton (back) and Latin sudis (a fish, esox, the name of salmon).

== Description ==
Waryfishes are slender, scaled fish, similar in appearance to lancetfishes, but lacking the greatly enlarged dorsal fin. Although the adults are deep-water fish, the larvae inhabit surface waters, and are unique in having teeth on their upper jaws. Waryfishes lack a swim bladder.

- Dorsal fin: 9–14 rays
- Anal fin: 16–21 rays
- Pectoral fin: 10–15 rays
- Scales in lateral line: 44–65
