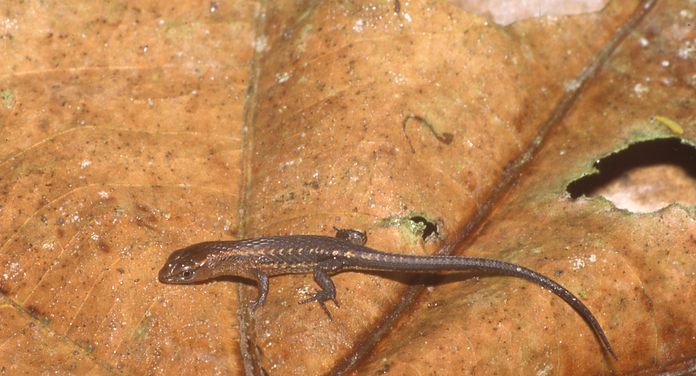

Conservation status
- Least Concern (IUCN 3.1)

Scientific classification
- Kingdom: Animalia
- Phylum: Chordata
- Class: Reptilia
- Order: Squamata
- Family: Alopoglossidae
- Genus: Alopoglossus
- Species: A. angulatus

Binomial name
- Alopoglossus angulatus (Linnaeus, 1758)

Synonyms
- Lacerta angulata Linnaeus, 1758; Leposoma carinacaudatum Cope, 1876; Lepidosoma carinacaudatum Cope, 1876; Alopoglossus carinacaudatus — Boulenger, 1885; Alopoglossus amazonius Ruthven, 1924; Pantodactylus amazonicus — Amaral, 1937; Alopoglossus andeanus Ruibal, 1952; Alopoglosus copii surinamensis Brongersma, 1946; Alopoglossus angulatus — Hoogmoed, 1973

= Alopoglossus angulatus =

Species of lizard

Alopoglossus angulatus, known commonly as the northern teiid, is a species of lizard in the family Alopoglossidae. The species is endemic to northern South America.

== Geographic range ==
A. angulatus is found in Brazil, Colombia, Ecuador, French Guiana, Guyana, Peru, and Suriname.

== Habitat ==
The preferred habitat of A. angulatus is leaf litter in lowland, tropical forests, or wetlands at altitudes of 100–760 m (330–2,490 ft).

== Reproduction ==
A. angulatus is oviparous.
