= Jay M. Savage =

American herpetologist (1928–2025)

Jay Mathers Savage (August 1928 – November 3, 2025) was an American herpetologist known for his research on reptiles and amphibians of Central America. He was a past president of the American Society of Ichthyologists and Herpetologists, the Society of Systematic Biologists, and the Southern California Academy of Sciences. He received his bachelor's (1950), master's (1954), and doctoral (1955) degrees from Stanford University. He produced around 200 publications, including the books Evolution (Holt, Rinehart and Winston, 1968) and The Amphibians and Reptiles of Costa Rica: A Herpetofauna between Two Continents, between Two Sea (University of Chicago Press, 2002). He was an emeritus professor at the University of Miami and adjunct professor at San Diego State University.

He was the first to describe, in 1966, the now-extinct golden toad (Incilius periglenes) of Monteverde, Costa Rica.

Savage died on November 3, 2025, at the age of 97.

== Taxa named in his honor ==
Savage is commemorated in the scientific names of 18 animal species.

=== Amphibians ===
The frog genus Barycholos (from the Greek word for "savage")

=== Reptiles ===
- Diplodactylus savagei
- Pseuderemias savagei
- Sonora savagei
- Sphaerodactylus savagei

=== Fish ===
Rhamphocetichthys savagei Paxton, 1989, Savage's bird-snouted whalefish, a species of flabby whalefish.
