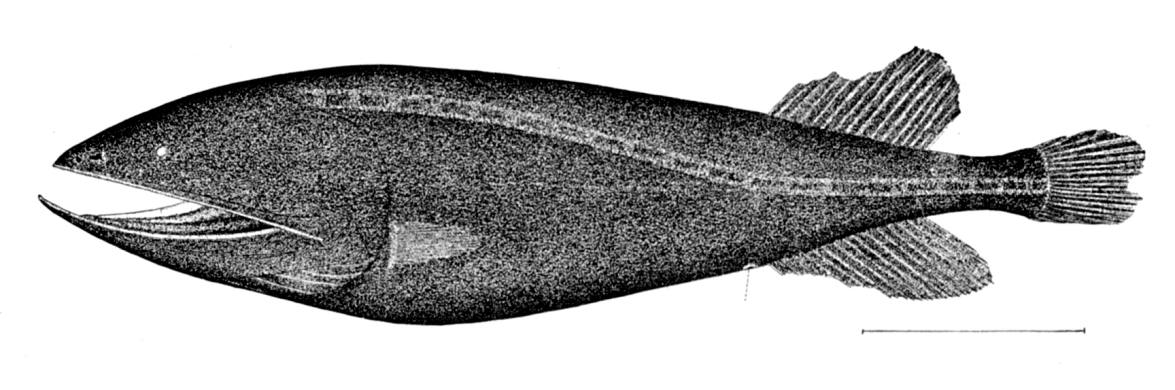
- Cetomimus gillii
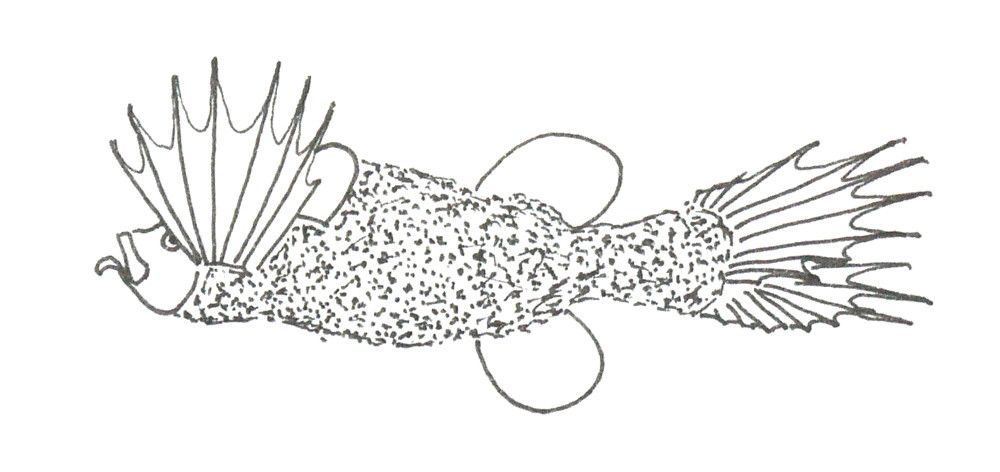
- Hairyfish (Mirapinna esau)

Scientific classification
- Kingdom: Animalia
- Phylum: Chordata
- Class: Actinopterygii
- Order: Beryciformes
- Suborder: Stephanoberycoidei
- Family: Cetomimidae; Goode & T. H. Bean, 1895

Genera
- Ataxolepis; Cetichthys; Cetomimoides; Cetomimus; Cetostoma; Danacetichthys; Ditropichthys; Eutaeniophorus; Gyrinomimus; Megalomycter; Mirapinna; Notocetichthys; Parataeniophorus; Procetichthys; Rhamphocetichthys; Vitiaziella

= Cetomimidae =

Family of ray-finned fishes

Cetomimidae is a family of small, deep-sea beryciform ray-finned fish. They are among the most deep-living fish known, with some species recorded at depths in excess of 3,500 m (11,500 ft). Females are known as flabby whalefishes, Males are known as bignose fishes, while juveniles are known as tapetails and were formerly thought to be in a separate family, dubbed Mirapinnidae. Adults exhibit extreme sexual dimorphism, and the adult males were once thought to be exemplars of still another family, Megalomycteridae.

Thought to have a circumglobal distribution throughout the Southern Hemisphere, Cetomimidae are the most diverse family of whalefishes. The largest species, Gyrinomimus grahami, reaches a length of some 40 cm, though most species average around 20 cm. They are distinguished from other whalefishes by their loose, scaleless skin and lack of photophores.

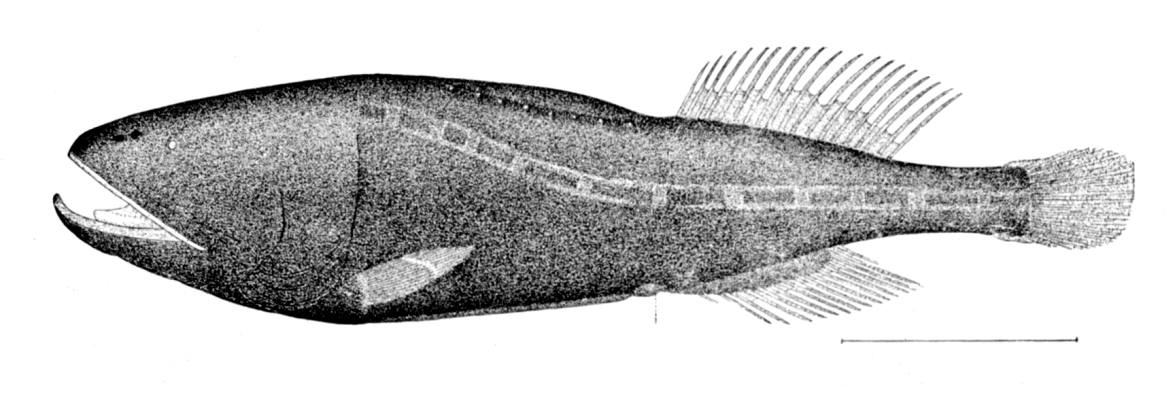
Ditropichthys storeri

== Description ==
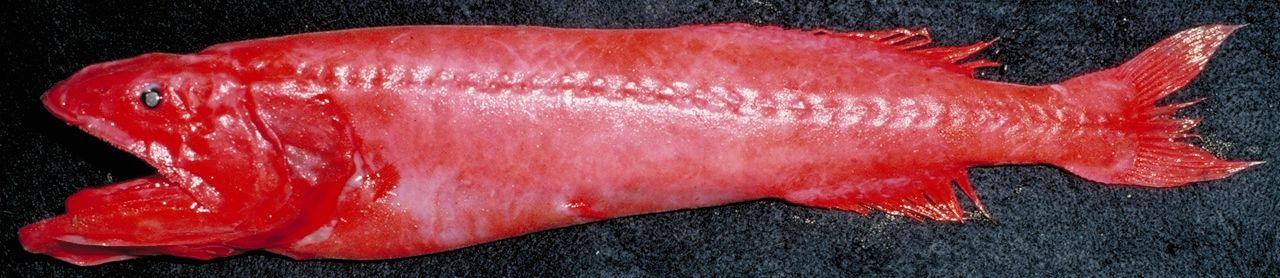
Female Cetomimidae, also known as a flabby whalefish

Living at extreme, lightless depths, adult females have evolved an exceptionally well-developed lateral line system. Their eyes are either very small or vestigial and instead this system of sensory pores (running the length of the body in a distinct lateral line) helps the fish to accurately perceive its surroundings by detecting vibrations. Named after the baleen whale-like bodies of adult females (from the Greek ketos meaning "whale" or "sea monster" and mimos meaning "imitative"), Cetomimidae have large mouths, and their dorsal and anal fins are set far back of the head. All fins lack spines, and the pelvic fins are absent. The fish also lack swim bladders.

Adult female Cetomimidae are a red to orange-brown color in life, with the fins and jaws, in particular, being brightly colored. Longer electromagnetic wavelengths (such as red and orange) do not penetrate this depth of the ocean. Animals which have evolved at this depth cannot see these longer wavelengths, rendering the fish effectively black.

Their stomachs are highly distensible, allowing adult females to pursue prey otherwise too large for them to eat. Adult males do not eat at all, their jaws having fused shut during the transformation from their juvenile phase. Males retain the shells of prey consumed while still in the juvenile form and continue to metabolize these shells throughout the remainder of their lives. Both traits may have evolved due to extreme food scarcity in the ocean depths.

Though little is known regarding their life history, new discoveries are being made. They live in the nutrient-poor habitat of the oceanic bathypelagic zone, at depths between 1,000 and 4,000 m. They are believed to swim upward, toward the upper section of this zone, when laying and fertilising their eggs, as most fish in this zone do, as it contains more nutrients. Cetomimidae larvae have not been found below depths of 1000 m. In early 2009, the Royal Society published an article detailing the discovery "that three families with greatly differing morphologies, Mirapinnidae (tapetails), Megalomycteridae (bignose fishes), and Cetomimidae (whalefishes), are larvae, males, and females, respectively, of a single-family, Cetomimidae." Apparently, "morphological transformations involve dramatic changes in the skeleton, most spectacularly in the head, and are correlated with distinctly different feeding mechanisms. Larvae have small, upturned mouths and gorge on copepods. Females have huge gapes with long, horizontal jaws and specialized gill arches allowing them to capture larger prey. Males cease feeding, lose their stomach and esophagus, and apparently convert the energy from the bolus of copepods found in all transforming males to a massive liver that supports them throughout adult life."

Like many deep-sea fishes, Cetomimidae is thought to undergo nightly vertical migrations; they feed within the upper 700 m of the water column by starlight and retreat back to the abyssal depths by daybreak. Judging by the latest studies, the younger fish seem to frequent shallower water more than the adults do.

== Tapetails ==
Before a report released in January 2009, the juveniles of the species were thought to belong to a separate taxonomic family Mirapinnidae in the Cetomimiform order, with three genera Eutaeniophorus, Mirapinna, and Parataeniophorus. These "tapetails," as they are also known, had been known exclusively from immature specimens, which live in shallower waters than the adults.

The tapetails are named for their caudal fins, which include a narrow streamer that may be longer than the fish's body. The genus Mirapinna, known as the hairyfish, lacks the streamer, but has multiple hair-like growths on its body. All mirapinnids lack scales and fin rays. Mirapinnids are all small fish, less than 7 cm (2.8 in) in length. They feed on small crustaceans. Male juveniles retain the copepods of these crustaceans, which they process in their liver for the rest of their life. "Most of the largest juveniles have a gut swollen with copepods visible externally in life as a swollen orange bulge. This bolus of copepods must provide the nutrition required to generate the large liver that sustains the male through the rest of its life."
