= Norman Bertram Marshall =

British ichthyologist (1915-1996)

Norman Bertram Marshall, known as Freddy, (5 February 1915 – 13 February 1996) was a British marine biologist and ichthyologist who was worked at the British Museum (Natural History). His main interests were in the area of deep sea research.

== Early life ==
Freddy Marshall was born in the Cambridgeshire village of Great Shelford, where his family had lived for generations in a house built by his father; both his father and grandfather were builders. He was the eldest of four children, having two brothers and a sister. His father joined the Cambridgeshire Regiment and went to fight in the First World War in France before Freddy was born. From 1920 he attended the village's church school and in 1926 went to the Cambridge and County High School. During his school years Freddy was more interested in fishing than in his studies and narrowly avoided expulsion. However, he attained a Higher School Certificate with distinctions in zoology and botany.

== Cambridge and early career ==
In 1933 Marshall entered Downing College, Cambridge as an Exhibitioner, supported by scholarships from both the Cambridgeshire County Council and the Board of Education. He gained a double first in the Natural Sciences Tripos, having read Zoology Part II. As an undergraduate he was interested in embryology and this led to him being introduced by his professor John Stanley Gardiner to E.S. Russell, whose book The Interpretation of Development and Heredity Marshall had admired. Russell at the time was Director of Fisheries Investigations at the Ministry of Agriculture and Fisheries and they discussed fish biology but Marshall was set on pursuing his interest in embryology. However, Gardiner advised Freddy to broaden his horizons and introduced him to a Commander Hawkridge who had an office insuring fishing boats in Hull. Hawkridge was able to arrange berths for Marshall on fishing boats during his vacation, which allowed Marshall to visit the waters off Iceland three times and Bear Island and the Faroes once each. It was on these voyages that Marshall was first introduced to the macrourid fish on which he would become an authority. These trips may have had some influence on Marshall's decision to give up embryology and to apply for a post as a marine biologist in Hull.

Marshall was appointed to be part of Alister Hardy's Department of Zoology and Oceanography at University College, Hull in 1937. Here he became involved in research on plankton and spent many hours working on the reels of bolting silk which were used by Hardy's plankton recorders. The plankton was trapped in the silk which was concealed inside artificial herrings dragged behind commercial ships. He was particularly looking for the two indicator species of arrow worms.

He had been lodged in unsatisfactory accommodation in Hull and Jacob Bronowski suggested that Marshall move in to his lodgings. Here Marshall was given the nickname "Freddy" by Bronowski with whom he became friends and also met his landlady's daughter, Olga Stonehouse, whom he married in 1944. During his stay at these lodgings he also made friends with Cyril Lewis, who lived in the next street and, after Lewis moved to Edinburgh, Marshall stayed with him when he was posted to Hull's northern outpost in Leith.

== Army service ==
Marshall was commissioned in to the Royal Army Ordnance Corps in 1941 and stationed on the Thames for a while before being transferred, like many other biologists, into operation research. In 1944 he was seconded from the Army to the Colonial Office for special duties. David Lack informed him that Operation Tabarin was looking for volunteers suitable for manning Antarctic bases. Operation Tabarin was a British operation to deny the use of Antarctic islands and mainland to Axis forces and to reinforce British claims in the region.

Marshall contacted Brian Roberts who was coordinating the Operation and Roberts sent him to Canada to collect 25 huskies to be used in the Antarctic by the teams involved in Operation Tabarin. He flew to Labrador to collect the dogs on 19 September 1944, only ten days after his wedding to Olga. He returned to Liverpool on board a Free French cargo ship, the Indochinois accompanied by Surgeon Commander Edward W. Bingham, who had much more experience with huskies than Marshall. On arrival at Liverpool they and the dogs were transferred to the RSS John Biscoe to sail to the Antarctic, where he was based at Hope Bay as the zoologist.

== Post-war career ==
When Marshall returned to Hull in September 1946 he was able to spend a lot of his time at the British Museum (Natural History) working on his collection of fish from his time in the Antarctic. In the summer of 1947 Marshall was appointed to the Department of Zoology at the Museum. He replaced J.R. Norman, who had died in post, as an Assistant Keeper. For the next 25 years Marshall worked at the BM(NH) becoming a Special Merit Senior Scientific Officer in 1962. He travelled widely during his time at the Museum, spending time in the United States and on oceanographic expeditions on a number of research vessels. Following advice from Albert Eide Parr he specialised in studying the swim bladder, especially that of deep-sea fish. He also conducted a well received series of lectures at Harvard University and worked at the Woods Hole Oceanographic Institution in 1963. He also worked at the University of Miami and the Scripps Institution of Oceanography. He was elected to Fellowship of the Royal Society in 1970.

He was awarded the Polar Medal in 1953 and in 1971 the Rosenstiel Gold Medal for services to Marine Biology. In 1972, Marshall left his position at the museum to become the Chair of Zoology at Queen Mary College, London University and remained in that post until he retired in 1977.

Marshall was the author of three major and influential books on marine biology, Aspects of deep-sea biology in 1954, Explorations in the lives of fishes in 1963 and Developments in deep sea biology in 1979. The text of these books written by Marshall was accompanied by illustrations by Olga. He was also the author of many scientific papers.

== Personal life ==
Marshall married Olga Stonehouse on 9 September 1944 and they had one son, Justin, also a marine biologist, and three daughters. While Marshall was working in London they lived in Saffron Walden where their house was built by his architect brother, Peter, from bricks left from a ruined coach house that had occupied the site. He was keen on music and while staying with Lewis in Edinburgh had developed an interest in the music of Donald Tovey. He also played golf, enjoyed Bach and took an interest in many subjects. He was friends with Arthur Koestler who often came to visit him and discuss literature and philosophy. In 1996 Marshall and Olga moved to Great Chesterford in Essex where he died suddenly on 13 February 1996 while working on a new book about simplicity in biology.

== Legacy ==
The grenadier Coryphaenoides marshalli and the needletooth cusk (Epetriodus freddyi) are named after him, as is Marshall Peak in Antarctica, which was so named by the Falkland Islands Dependencies Survey in recognition of Marshall's work on Operation Tarabin.

== Publications ==
A selection of the publications authored or co-authored by Marshall are set out below:

- 1948 Continuous Plankton Records: Zooplankton, other than copepoda and young fish, in the North Sea, 1938-1939. by Bertram Norman Marshall Hull Bulletins of Marine Ecology vol. 2. no. 13.
- 1955 Alepisauroid fishes by Norman Bertram Marshall Discovery reports v. 27, pg. 303-336.
- 1958 Aspects of deep sea biology by Norman Bertram Marshall; Olga Marshall; Hutchinson, London
- 1960 Swim bladder structure of deep-sea fishes in relation to their systematics and biology by Norman Bertram Marshall; National Institute of Oceanography of Great Britain. Discovery reports, vol. 31, p. 1-122.
- 1961 A young Macristium and the ctenothrissid fishes by Norman Bertram Marshall Bulletin of the British Museum (Natural History): Zoology. 7, 8
- 1962 A photographic survey of benthic fishes in the Red Sea and Gulf of Aden, with observations on their population density, diversity and habits by Norman Bertram Marshall; Donald W Bourne Bulletin of the Museum of Comparative Zoology, v. 132, no. 2.
- 1962 Observations on the Heteromi, an order of teleost fishes Norman Bertram Marshall; British Museum (Natural History) Bulletin of the British Museum (Natural History) Zoology, v. 9, no. 6.
- 1966 Bathyprion danae : a new genus and species of alepocephaliform fishes by Norman Bertram Marshall Dana-report, no. 68
- 1966 The bathypelagic macrourid fish, Macrouroides inflaticeps Smith and Radcliffe by Norman Bertram Marshall; Å Vedel Tåning; Dana-report, no. 69
- 1967 The life of fishes by N.B. Marshall; Weidenfeld and Nicolson, London ISBN 0297169688
- 1971 Ocean Life in Colour by Norman B. Marshall illustrated by Olga Marshall Blandford Colour Series
- 1971 Ocean Life by Norman Bertram; Marshall Macmillan, New York
- 1979 Developments in deep-sea biology by Norman Bertram Marshall; Blandford Press, Poole
- 1980 Explorations in the life of fishes by Norman Bertram Marshall; Harvard Press, Cambridge
- 1981 Aspects of marine zoology : the proceedings of a symposium held at the Zoological society of London on 23 and 24 March 1966 Norman Bertram Marshall; Zoological Society of London. Academic Press, London
- 1981 Deep-sea biology : Developments and perspectives. by Norman Bertram Marshall; Garland STPM Press, New York
