= Himantolophus macroceras =

Conservation status
- Data Deficient (IUCN 3.1)

Scientific classification
- Domain: Eukaryota
- Kingdom: Animalia
- Phylum: Chordata
- Class: Actinopterygii
- Order: Lophiiformes
- Family: Himantolophidae
- Genus: Himantolophus
- Species: H. macroceras

Binomial name
- Himantolophus macroceras Bertelsen & G. Krefft, 1988

Species of fish

Himantolophus macroceras is a species of footballfish, a type of anglerfish. The fish is bathypelagic and has been found as deep as 2,100 metres (6,900 ft). It is endemic to the east central Atlantic Ocean.
