= Himantolophus macroceratoides =

Conservation status
- Data Deficient (IUCN 3.1)

Scientific classification
- Kingdom: Animalia
- Phylum: Chordata
- Class: Actinopterygii
- Order: Lophiiformes
- Family: Himantolophidae
- Genus: Himantolophus
- Species: H. macroceratoides

Binomial name
- Himantolophus macroceratoides Bertelsen & G. Krefft, 1988

Species of fish

Himantolophus macroceratoides is a species of footballfish, a type of anglerfish. The fish is bathypelagic and has been found at depths ranging from 800 to 900 metres (2,600 to 3,000 ft). It is endemic to the east central Atlantic Ocean.
