= Himantolophus multifurcatus =

Conservation status
- Data Deficient (IUCN 3.1)

Scientific classification
- Kingdom: Animalia
- Phylum: Chordata
- Class: Actinopterygii
- Order: Lophiiformes
- Family: Himantolophidae
- Genus: Himantolophus
- Species: H. multifurcatus

Binomial name
- Himantolophus multifurcatus Bertelsen & G. Krefft, 1988

Species of fish

Himantolophus multifurcatus is a species of footballfish, a type of anglerfish. The fish is bathypelagic and has been found at depths ranging from 200 to 365 metres (656 to 1,198 ft). It is endemic to the east central Atlantic Ocean.
