= Himantolophus pseudalbinares =

Scientific classification
- Kingdom: Animalia
- Phylum: Chordata
- Class: Actinopterygii
- Order: Lophiiformes
- Family: Himantolophidae
- Genus: Himantolophus
- Species: H. pseudalbinares

Binomial name
- Himantolophus pseudalbinares Bertelsen & G. Krefft, 1988

Species of fish

Himantolophus pseudalbinares is a species of footballfish, a type of anglerfish. The fish is bathypelagic and has been found as deep as 1,300 metres (4,300 ft). The species is endemic to the southeast Atlantic Ocean.
