= Himantolophus crinitus =

Conservation status
- Least Concern (IUCN 3.1)

Scientific classification
- Kingdom: Animalia
- Phylum: Chordata
- Class: Actinopterygii
- Order: Lophiiformes
- Family: Himantolophidae
- Genus: Himantolophus
- Species: H. crinitus

Binomial name
- Himantolophus crinitus Bertelsen & G. Krefft, 1988

Species of fish

Himantolophus crinitus is a species of footballfish, a type of anglerfish. The fish is bathypelagic and has been found at depths of around 610 metres (2,000 ft). It is endemic to the eastern and southeastern central Atlantic Ocean. The species is currently only known from 11 specimens. Females attain a maximum size of 8.3 cm. While males have not yet been recorded, they are likely to be diminutive in comparison to the females, as is common in the family Himantolophidae.
