= Himantolophus melanolophus =

Conservation status
- Data Deficient (IUCN 3.1)

Scientific classification
- Kingdom: Animalia
- Phylum: Chordata
- Class: Actinopterygii
- Order: Lophiiformes
- Family: Himantolophidae
- Genus: Himantolophus
- Species: H. melanolophus

Binomial name
- Himantolophus melanolophus Bertelsen & G. Krefft, 1988

Species of fish

Himantolophus melanolophus is a species of footballfish, a type of anglerfish. The fish is bathypelagic and has been found at depths ranging from 360 to 880 metres (1,180 to 2,890 ft). It is endemic to the west central Atlantic Ocean.
