= Himantolophus mauli =

Scientific classification
- Kingdom: Animalia
- Phylum: Chordata
- Class: Actinopterygii
- Order: Lophiiformes
- Family: Himantolophidae
- Genus: Himantolophus
- Species: H. mauli

Binomial name
- Himantolophus mauli Bertelsen & G. Krefft, 1988

Species of fish

Himantolophus mauli, The Eastern Atlantic Footballfish is a species of footballfish, a type of anglerfish. The fish is bathypelagic and have been found at depths ranging from 400 to 750 metres (1,310 to 2,460 ft). It is endemic to the eastern Atlantic Ocean.
