= Himantolophus nigricornis =

Scientific classification
- Kingdom: Animalia
- Phylum: Chordata
- Class: Actinopterygii
- Order: Lophiiformes
- Family: Himantolophidae
- Genus: Himantolophus
- Species: H. nigricornis

Binomial name
- Himantolophus nigricornis Bertelsen & G. Krefft, 1988

Species of fish

Himantolophus nigricornis is a species of footballfish, a type of anglerfish. The fish is bathypelagic and is endemic to the central Pacific Ocean.
