= Himantolophus cornifer =

Conservation status
- Least Concern (IUCN 3.1)

Scientific classification
- Kingdom: Animalia
- Phylum: Chordata
- Class: Actinopterygii
- Order: Lophiiformes
- Family: Himantolophidae
- Genus: Himantolophus
- Species: H. cornifer

Binomial name
- Himantolophus cornifer Bertelsen & G. Krefft, 1988

Species of fish

Himantolophus cornifer is a species of footballfish, a type of anglerfish. The fish is bathypelagic and can be found at depths ranging from 0 to 1,900 metres (0 to 6,234 ft). It has been found in the Indian, Pacific, and Atlantic Oceans.
