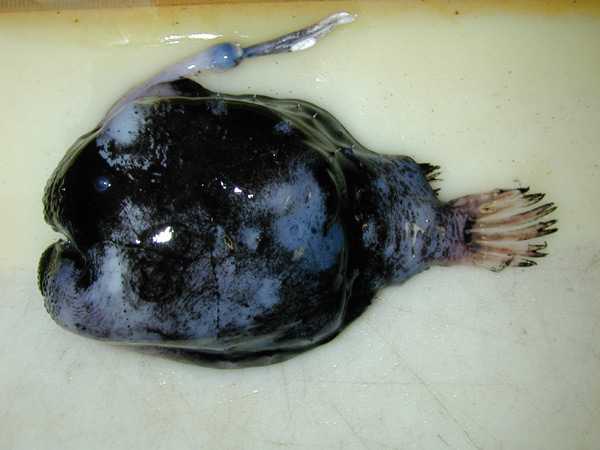

Conservation status
- Least Concern (IUCN 3.1)

Scientific classification
- Kingdom: Animalia
- Phylum: Chordata
- Class: Actinopterygii
- Order: Lophiiformes
- Family: Himantolophidae
- Genus: Himantolophus
- Species: H. paucifilosus

Binomial name
- Himantolophus paucifilosus Bertelsen & G. Krefft, 1988

= Himantolophus paucifilosus =

Species of fish

Himantolophus paucifilosus is a species of marine fish of the family Himantolophidae, the footballfishes, a type of anglerfish. The fish is bathypelagic and has been found at depths ranging from 100 to 1,540 metres (330 to 5,050 ft). It occurs in the east central Atlantic Ocean, from Cape Verde and Senegal in the north to Namibia and Angola in the south, and also on the coast of Brazil.
