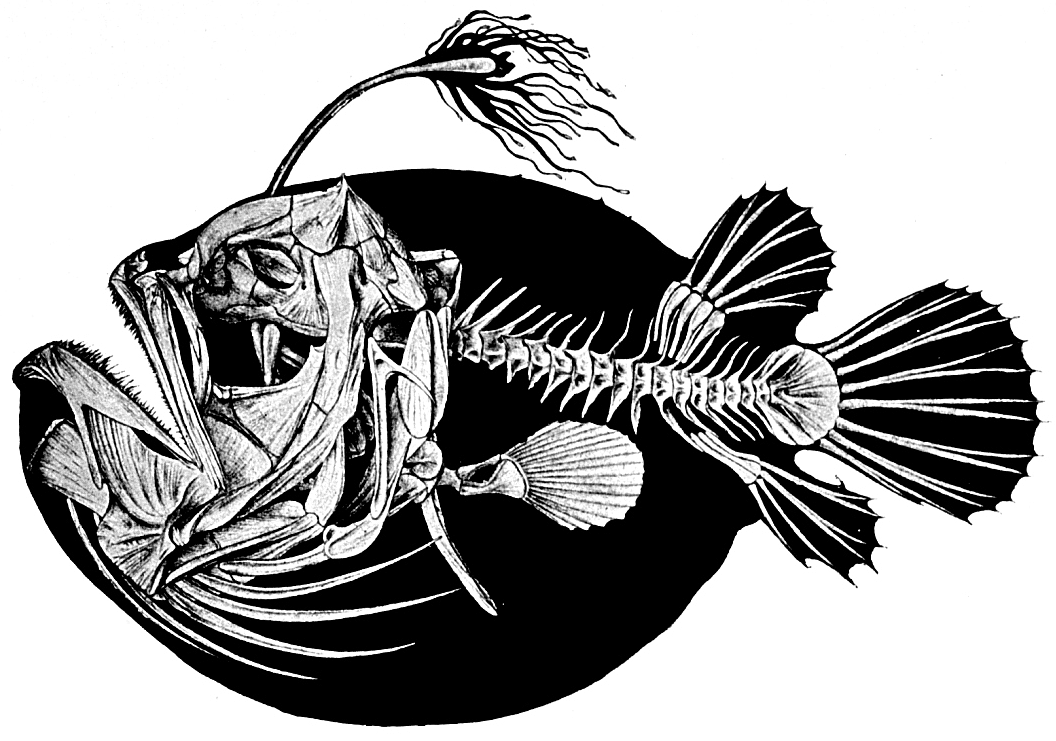
- Himantolophus groenlandicus

Scientific classification
- Kingdom: Animalia
- Phylum: Chordata
- Class: Actinopterygii
- Order: Lophiiformes
- Suborder: Ceratioidei
- Family: Himantolophidae; Gill, 1861
- Genus: Himantolophus; J. C. H. Reinhardt, 1837

Type species
- Himantolophus groenlandicus Reinhardt, 1837

Species
- See text

Synonyms
- Aegoeonichthys Clarke, 1878; Corynolophus Gill, 1878; Lipactis Regan, 1925; Rhynchoceratias Regan, 1925

= Footballfish =

Family of fishes

The footballfish form a family, Himantolophidae, of globose, deep-sea anglerfishes found in tropical and subtropical waters of the Atlantic, Indian, and Pacific Ocean. The family contains 23 species, all of which are classified in a single genus, Himantolophus.

== Etymology ==
The football fish family and genus names are derived from a combination of himantos, which means a "leather strap", "thong" or "leash", with lophus, meaning "crest" or "tuft". Reinhardt did not explain this name but it is thought to refer to the thick, leathery illicium of the type species, H. groenlandicus.

== Taxonomy ==
The footballfish genus, Himantolophus was first proposed as a monospecific genus in 1837 by the Norwegian zoologist Johan Reinhardt when he described Himantolophus groenlandicus. Reinhardt gave the type locality of H. groenlandicus as being near Godthaab in Greenland where it had been washed ashore. In 1861 Theodore Gill placed Himantolophus in the new monotypic family Himantolophidae. The 5th edition of Fishes of the World classifies this family in the suborder Ceratioidei of the anglerfish order Lophiiformes.

== Species and species groups ==
There are currently 23 recognized species in this genus and these are divided into species groups as set out below.

- groenlandicus group
  - Himantolophus crinitus Bertelsen & G. Krefft, 1988
  - Himantolophus danae Regan & Trewavas, 1932
  - Himantolophus groenlandicus J. C. H. Reinhardt, 1837 (Atlantic footballfish)
  - Himantolophus paucifilosus Bertelsen & G. Krefft, 1988
  - Himantolophus sagamius S. Tanaka (I), 1918 (Pacific footballfish)
- appelii group
  - Himantolophus appelii F. E. Clarke, 1878 (Prickly anglerfish)
  - Himantolophus stewarti Pietsch & Kenaley, 2011
- nigricornis group
  - Himantolophus melanolophus Bertelsen & G. Krefft, 1988
  - Himantolophus nigricornis Bertelsen & G. Krefft, 1988
- albinares group
  - Himantolophus albinares Maul, 1961
  - Himantolophus borealis Kharin, 1984
  - Himantolophus kalami Rajeeshjumar, Pietsch & Saravanane, 2022
  - Himantolophus mauli Bertelsen & G. Krefft, 1988
  - Himantolophus multifurcatus Bertelsen & G. Krefft, 1988
  - Himantolophus pseudalbinares Bertelsen & G. Krefft, 1988
- cornifer group
  - Himantolophus azurlucens Beebe & Crane, 1947
  - Himantolophus compressus Osório, 1912
  - Himantolophus cornifer Bertelsen & G. Krefft, 1988
  - Himantolophus litoceras A. L. Stewart & Pietsch, 2010
  - Himantolophus macroceras Bertelsen & G. Krefft, 1988
  - Himantolophus macroceratoides Bertelsen & G. Krefft, 1988
- brevirostris group
  - Himantolophus brevirostris Regan, 1925
- rostratus group
  - Himantolophus rostratus Regan, 1925

These groups were determined from the morphology of the metamorphosed females, except for brevirostris and rostratus which were determined from males only.

== Characteristics ==
Footballfish are sexually dimorphic with the metamorphosed females and males being very different in appearance. The metamorphosed females are distinguished from other anglerfishes of the suborder Ceratioidei by having a well developed lower jaw which protrudes beyond the snout. They also have a wide vomer which has no teeth, well developed spines on the sphenotic bone, there is a covering of low, rounded papillae on the snout and chin and, at least in larger individuals, there are conical spines in the skin which are scattered over the head and body.

The esca of footballfishes vary in size and morphology, to a greater extent than other deep sea anglerfishes. The metamorphosed males have a line of large spines above and behind the upper denticular bone, their eyes are directed to the sides and have moderately sized and they have a large olfactory system with sideways pointing nostrils. They have between 16 and 31 denticular teeth on the snout and between 20 and 50 on the chin, these teeth merge at their bases to form the upper and lower denticular bones. Their skin has a dense covering of dermal spinules. The larvae are round with a swollen appearance to the skin with pectoral fins that do not extend beyond the dorsal and anal fins, the females have a small club-shaped rudimentary illicium.

The males are considerably smaller than the females, for example in H. groenlandicus the maximum published standard length for a male is 4 cm (1.6 in) while that of a females is 60 cm (24 in).

== Distribution and habitat ==
Footballfishes are found in the mesopelagic and bathypelagic zones in the Atlantic, Pacific and Indian Oceans, as well as the Southern Ocean.

== Biology ==
Footballfishes are one of the ceratioid groups in which the males are free living and non-parasitic on the females. Despite their small size relative to the females, the males are the largest among the free-living male Ceratioids. The males use their highly developed olfactory organs to detect females, once they find a female they attach themselves to her but do not fuse with her (as in the parasitic species). The eggs and larvae are pelagic. The specialised teeth on the denticular bones are used to temporarily attach the male to the female. There are records of 5 females with white, circular scars on their skin, thought to be caused by males that became detached somehow, but have alternatively been suggested to be damage from parasitic copepods.

At the depths at which these fishes live it is dark and food is sparse and rarely encountered. The female footballfish have bioluminescent bacteria in their escas and this is used to attract prey to within striking distance of the mouth. The prey is whatever they can fit into their mouths, and the backward curving teeth ensure that prey are unable to escape. Recorded prey includes fishes, squid and crustaceans.

== Gallery ==
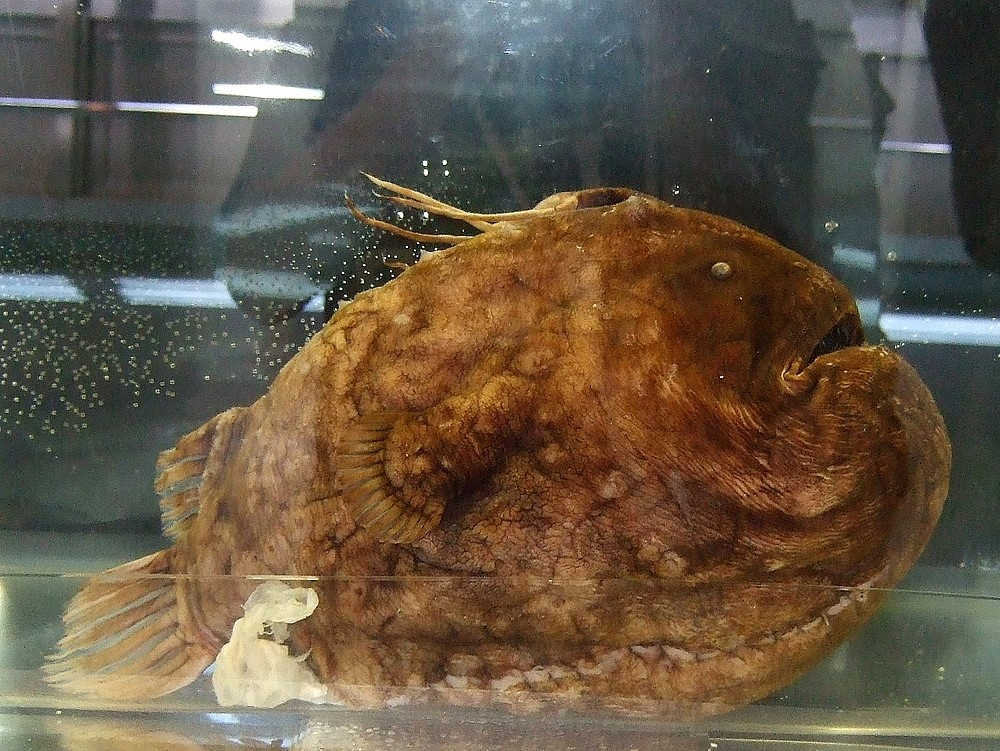

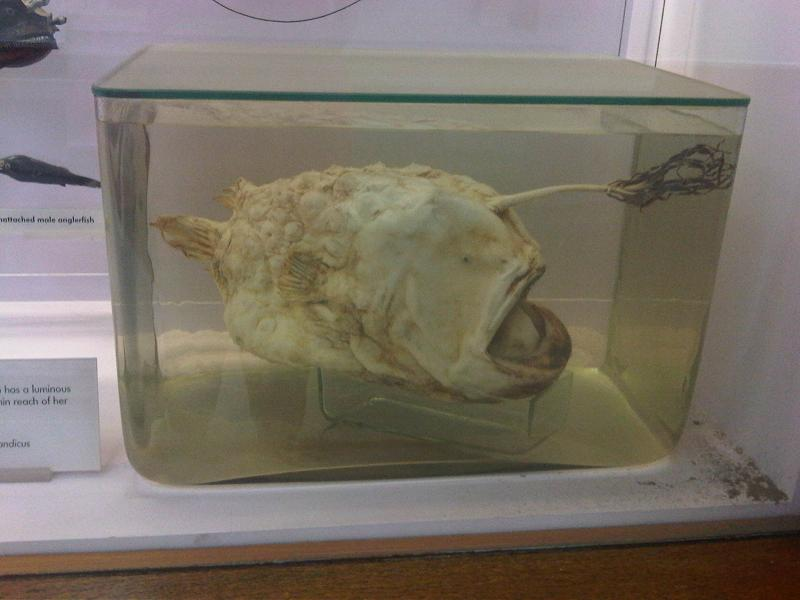

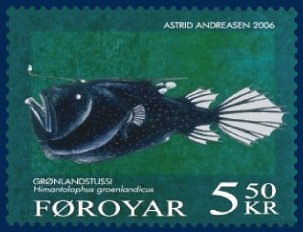
