= Protogrammus =

Scientific classification
- Kingdom: Animalia
- Phylum: Chordata
- Class: Actinopterygii
- Order: Syngnathiformes
- Family: Callionymidae
- Genus: Protogrammus; R. Fricke, 1985

Type species
- Callionymus sousai Maul, 1972

Genus of fishes

Protogrammus is a genus of dragonets found in the Atlantic and Pacific Oceans.

== Species ==
There are currently 3 recognized species in this genus:

- Protogrammus alboranensis R. Fricke, Ordines, Farias & García-Ruiz, 2016
- Protogrammus antipodus R. Fricke, 2006
- Protogrammus sousai (Maul, 1972) (Meteor dragonet)
