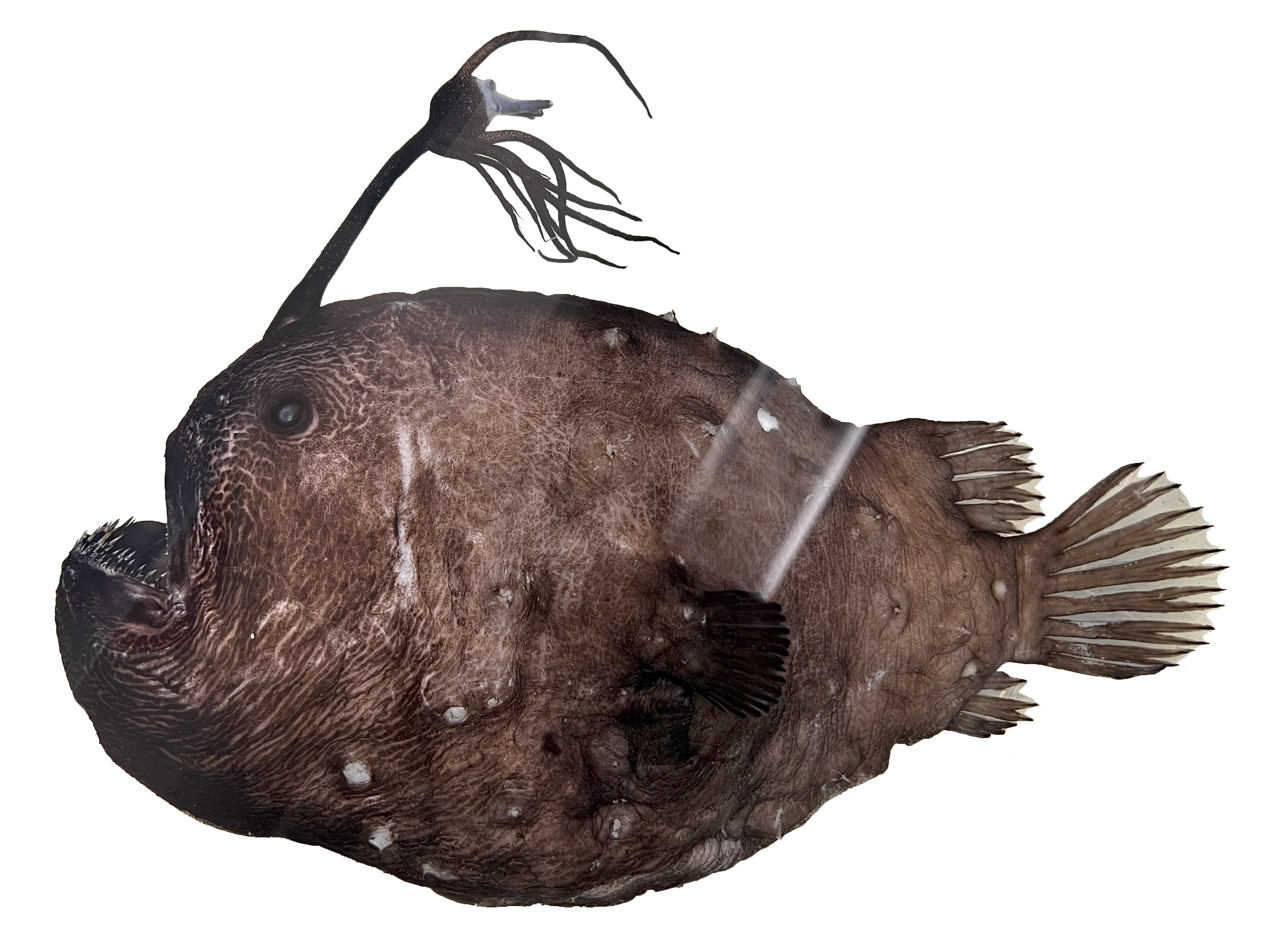
- Specimen preserved at the Scripps Institution of Oceanography (SIO 21-41)

Scientific classification
- Kingdom: Animalia
- Phylum: Chordata
- Class: Actinopterygii
- Order: Lophiiformes
- Family: Himantolophidae
- Genus: Himantolophus
- Species: H. sagamius

Binomial name
- Himantolophus sagamius (S. Tanaka (I), 1918)

= Pacific footballfish =

Species of fish

The Pacific footballfish (Himantolophus sagamius) is a species of footballfish (a type of anglerfish) native to the Pacific Ocean. It has a wide range, extending from the coasts of Honshu (Gulf of Sagami) and Hokkaido islands through the Kuril-Kamchatka trough, in the northwest Pacific, to the eastern Pacific from California to Peru. The species is known to live in waters as deep as 3,000 feet (900 m) or 500 fathoms.

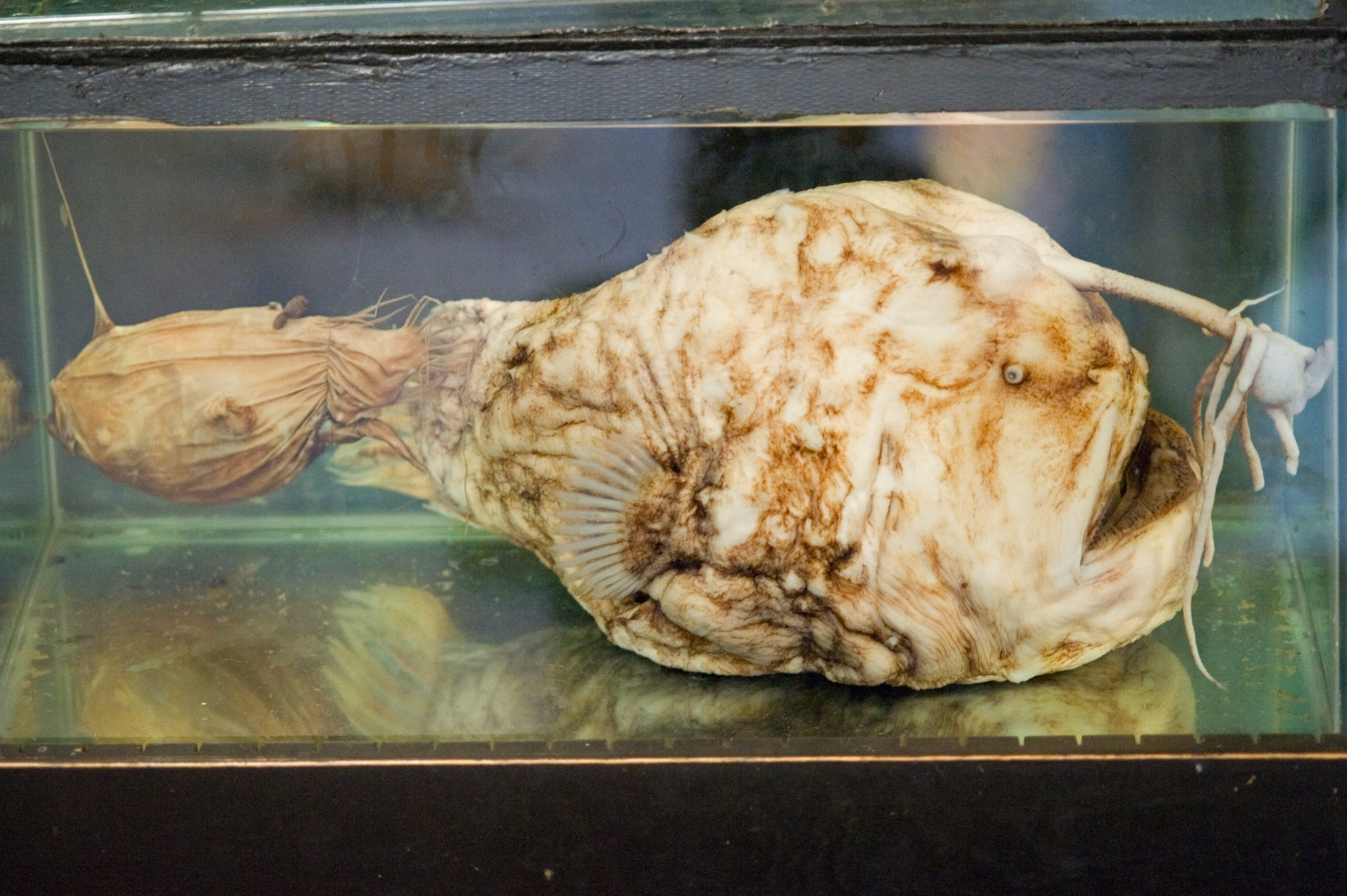
Specimen caught off the coast of San Clemente Island

== See also ==
- Bathyal zone
