= Himantolophus kalami =

Scientific classification
- Kingdom: Animalia
- Phylum: Chordata
- Class: Actinopterygii
- Order: Lophiiformes
- Family: Himantolophidae
- Genus: Himantolophus
- Species: H. kalami

Binomial name
- Himantolophus kalami Rajeeshjumar, Pietsch & Saravanane, 2022

Species of fish

Himantolophus kalami is a species of marine ray-finned fish belonging to the family Himantolophidae, the footballfishes. This species was described in 2022 by Melapurra Rajeeshkumar, Theodore Wells Pietsch III and Naryanane Saravanane with its type locality given as the east coast of the northern Andaman and Nicobar Islands, India. This species is a member of the Himantolophus albinares species complex, a classification partly based on the absence of anterior escal appendages. It differs from other species in this complex in having a unique illicial and escal morphology having a simple lower central filament and a pair of filaments on each side of the base the esca.

== Etymology ==
The specific name honours A. P. J. Abdul Kalam, the 11th president of India from 2002 to 2007, who was also an Indian aerospace engineer, recognising his contributions and encouragement of India's space research and missile technology, as well as his encouragement of students in his speeches and books.

== See also ==
- Horaglanis abdulkalami
- List of organisms named after famous people (born 1925–1949)
- List of things named after A. P. J. Abdul Kalam
