= Horaglanis abdulkalami =

Conservation status
- Endangered (IUCN 3.1)

Scientific classification
- Kingdom: Animalia
- Phylum: Chordata
- Class: Actinopterygii
- Division: Teleostei
- Order: Siluriformes
- Family: Clariidae
- Genus: Horaglanis
- Species: H. abdulkalami

Binomial name
- Horaglanis abdulkalami Subhash Babu, 2012
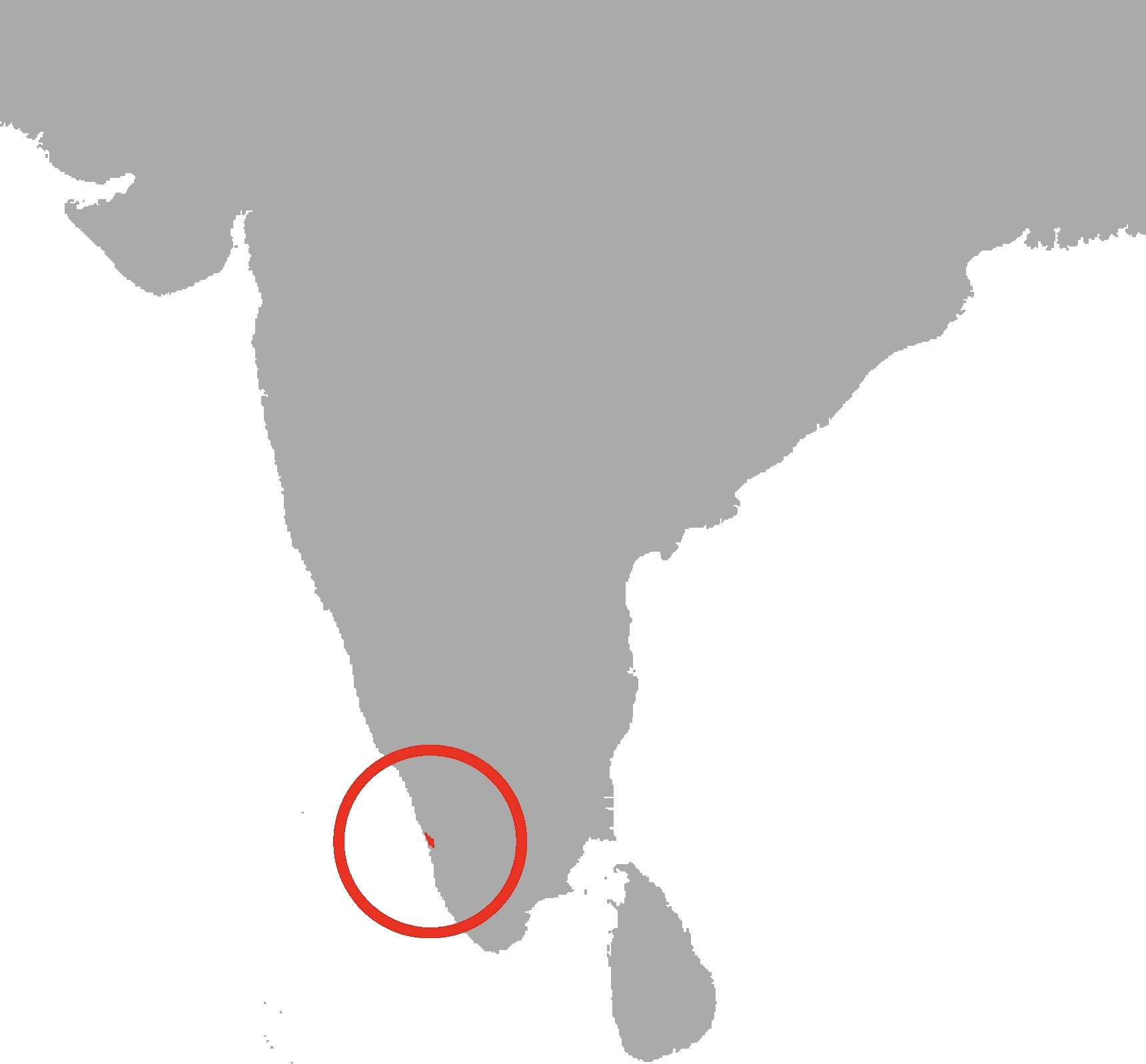

Species of fish

Horaglanis abdulkalami is a species of airbreathing catfish endemic to India.

== Description and naming ==
It was described by Subhash Babu Kallikadavil of the Cochin University of Science and Technology in 2012. It was named after former President of India A. P. J. Abdul Kalam.

== See also ==
- Himantolophus kalami
- List of organisms named after famous people (born 1925–1949)
- List of things named after A. P. J. Abdul Kalam
