= Himantolophus danae =

Scientific classification
- Domain: Eukaryota
- Kingdom: Animalia
- Phylum: Chordata
- Class: Actinopterygii
- Order: Lophiiformes
- Family: Himantolophidae
- Genus: Himantolophus
- Species: H. danae

Binomial name
- Himantolophus danae Regan & Trewavas, 1932

Species of fish

Himantolophus danae is a species of footballfish, a type of anglerfish. The fish is bathypelagic and has been found at a depth of 350 metres (1,150 ft). It is endemic to the west central Pacific Ocean.
