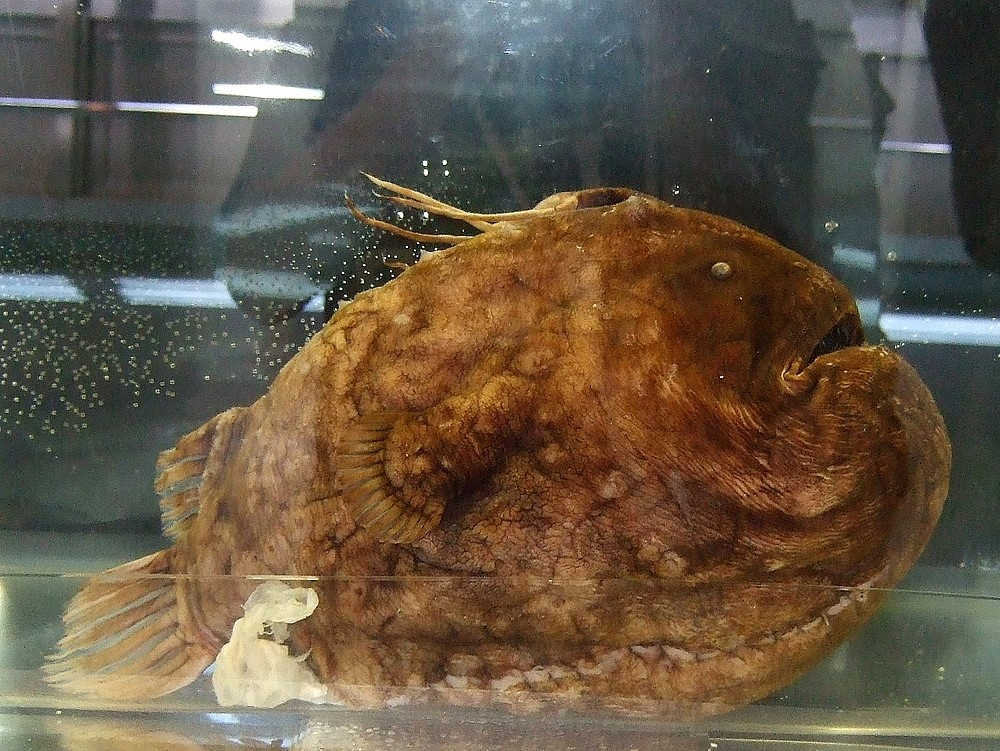
- Atlantic footballfish

Conservation status
- Least Concern (IUCN 3.1)

Scientific classification
- Kingdom: Animalia
- Phylum: Chordata
- Class: Actinopterygii
- Order: Lophiiformes
- Family: Himantolophidae
- Genus: Himantolophus
- Species: H. groenlandicus

Binomial name
- Himantolophus groenlandicus J. C. H. Reinhardt, 1837

Synonyms
- Himantolophus ranoides Barbour, 1942; Himantolophus reinhardti Lütken, 1878

= Himantolophus groenlandicus =

Species of fish

Himantolophus groenlandicus, the Atlantic footballfish or Atlantic football-fish, is a species of marine ray-finned fish belonging to the family Himantolophidae, the footballfishes. This fish is found primarily in mesopelagic depths of the ocean. Despite its name, this species might not be restricted to the Atlantic Ocean, with its range possibly extending into the Indian Ocean and to the Pacific Ocean. It is found in tropical and temperate regions.

== Taxonomy ==
Himantolophus groenlandicus was first formally described in 1837 by the Norwegian zoologist Johan Reinhardt with its type locality given as near Godthaab in Greenland where the type specimen was washed ashore. When he described H. groenlandicus Reinhardt classified it in a new monospecific genus, Himantolophus, so this species is the type species of that genus by monotypy. Within the genus this species is classified within the groenlandicus species group. In 1861 Theodore Gill placed Himantolophus in the new monotypic family Himantolophidae. The 5th edition of The 5th edition of Fishes of the World classifies this family in the suborder Ceratioidei of the anglerfish order Lophiiformes.

== Etymology ==
Himantolophus groenlandicus is the type species of the genus Himantolophus and this name is derived from a combination of himantos, which means a "leather strap", "thong" or "leash", with lophus, meaning "crest" or "tuft". Reinhardt did not explain this name but it is thought to refer to the thick, leathery illicium of this species. The specific name, groenlandicus, means "of Greenland", a reference to the type locality.

== Description ==
Himantolophis groenlandicus is sexually dimorphic with the metamorphosed females and males being very different in appearance. The metamorphosed have a well developed lower jaw which protrudes beyond the snout. They also have a wide vomer which has no teeth, well developed spines on the sphenotic bone, there is a covering of low, rounded papillae on the snout and chin and, at least in larger individuals, there are conical spines in the skin which are scattered over the head and body. The esca of footballfishes vary in size and morphology, to a greater extent than other deep sea anglerfishes. The metamorphosed males have a line of large spines above and behind the upper denticular bone, their eyes are directedto the sides and have moderately sized and they have a large olfactory system with sideways pointing nostrils. They have between 16 and 31 denticular teeth on the snout and between 20 and 50 on the chin, these teeth merge at thire bases to form the upper and lower denticular bones. Their skin has a dense covering of dermal spinules. The larvae are round with a swollen appearance to the skin with pectoral fins that do not extend beyond the dorsal and anal fins, the females have a small club-shaped rudimentary illicium. Features which distinguish this species include the length of the illicium being equivalent to 28–54% of the standard length, the esca has a pair of truncated appendages on its tip which are shorter than the diameter of the bulb and which are surrounded by 4 swellings, there are several branched or unbranched appendages on the bulb resembling tentacles. 1 or 2 of these are unpaired on the forward facing part of the tip, there is a forked one to the rear of the escal pore and 2 or more pairs on the side of the base of the bulb and part of illicial stem immediately below the esca. The males are considerably smaller than the females, the maximum published standard length for a male is 4 cm (1.6 in) while that of a females is 60 cm (24 in).

== Distribution and habitat ==
Himantolophus groenlandicus is found in the Atlantic Ocean from Greenland, Iceland and Norway south to Cape Town in South Africa. It may also occur in the Western Indian Ocean and has been recorded from the Western Pacific Ocean. This species or a closely related member of thegroenlandicus species group has been recorded off northern Chile in the Eastern Pacific Ocean. This species is found in the mesopelagic and bathypelagic zones at depths between 200 and 800 m (660 and 2,620 ft).

== Biology ==
Himantolophus groenlandicus males are free living and non-parasitic on the females. The males use their highly developed olfactory organs to detect females, once they find a female they attach themselves to her but do not fuse with her to become parasitic. The eggs and larvae are pelagic. The speialsed teeth on the denticular bones are used to temporarily attach the male to the female. There is a record of a female with a scar on her skin that was probably caused by a male that became detached.

At the depths at which these fishes live it is dark and food is sparse and rarely encountered. The female footballfish have bioluminescent bacteria in their escas and this is used to attract prey to within striking distance of the mouth. The prey is whatever they can fit into their mouths, and the backward curving teeth ensure that prey are unable to escape. Recorded prey includes fishes, squid and crustaceans.

Several specimens have been reported from the stomachs of sperm whales caught in the Azores.
