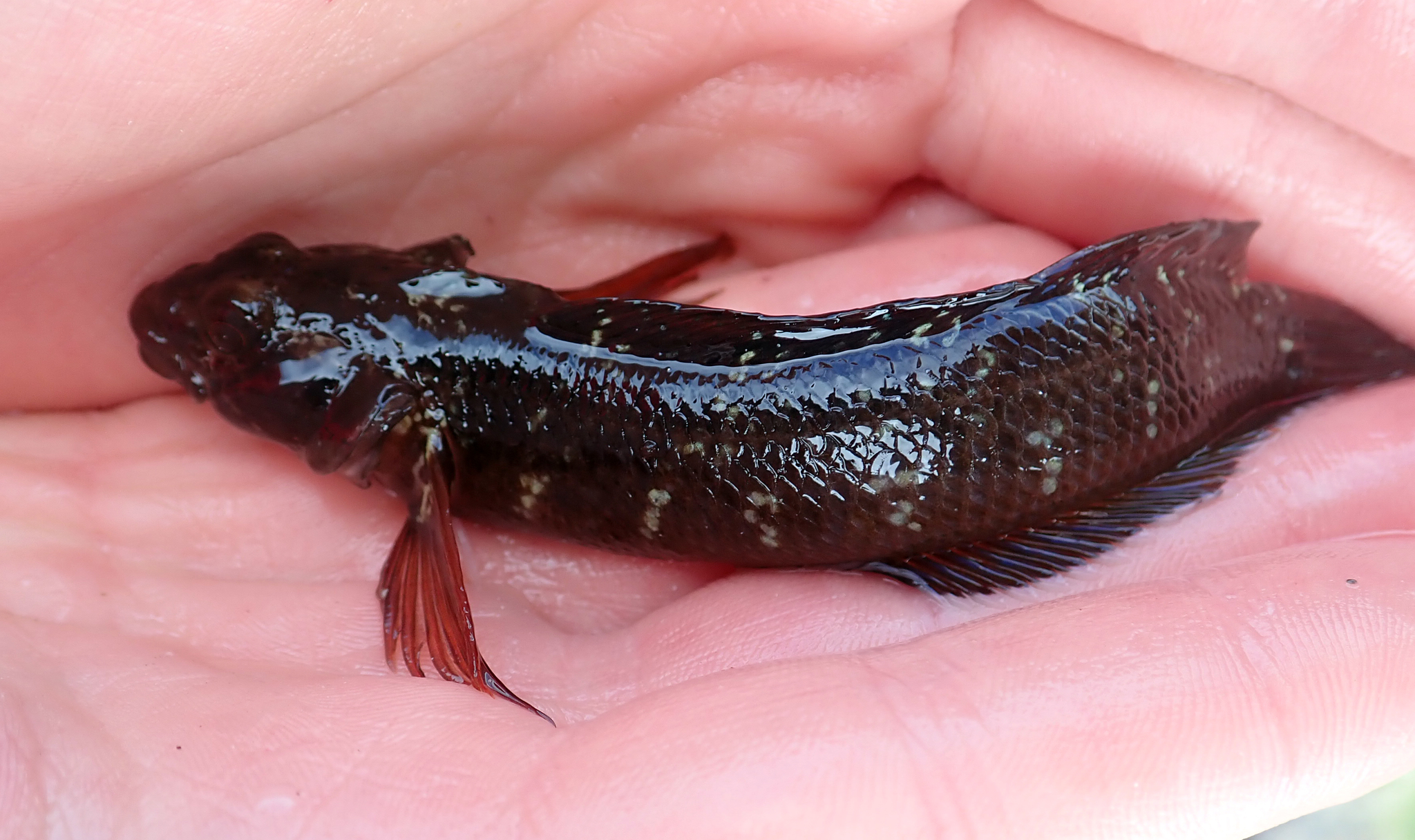
- Ruanoho decemdigitatus

Scientific classification
- Kingdom: Animalia
- Phylum: Chordata
- Class: Actinopterygii
- Order: Blenniiformes
- Family: Tripterygiidae
- Subfamily: Tripterygiinae
- Genus: Ruanoho; Hardy, 1986

Type species
- Trypterigium decemdigitatus F.E. Clarke, 1879

= Ruanoho =

Genus of fishes

Ruanoho is a genus of triplefin blennies (family Tripterygiidae). It is known from the southwestern Pacific Ocean off New Zealand. The generic name is a compound noun derived from the Māori rua meaning either "fish" or "hole" and noho meaning to "dwell" which refers to the habit of the species in this genus to shelter under rocks or within crevices.

== Species ==
- Longfinned triplefin, Ruanoho decemdigitatus (Clarke, 1879)
- Spectacled triplefin, Ruanoho whero Hardy, 1986
