= Himantolophus rostratus =

Conservation status
- Data Deficient (IUCN 3.1)

Scientific classification
- Kingdom: Animalia
- Phylum: Chordata
- Class: Actinopterygii
- Order: Lophiiformes
- Family: Himantolophidae
- Genus: Himantolophus
- Species: H. rostratus

Binomial name
- Himantolophus rostratus Regan, 1925

Species of fish

Himantolophus rostratus is a species of footballfish, a type of anglerfish. The fish is both mesopelagic and bathypelagic and can be found in the Atlantic and Pacific Oceans.
