= Himantolophus borealis =

Scientific classification
- Domain: Eukaryota
- Kingdom: Animalia
- Phylum: Chordata
- Class: Actinopterygii
- Order: Lophiiformes
- Family: Himantolophidae
- Genus: Himantolophus
- Species: H. borealis

Binomial name
- Himantolophus borealis Kharin, 1984

Species of fish

Himantolophus borealis is a species of footballfish, a type of anglerfish. The fish is bathypelagic and can be found at depths below 1,210 metres (3,970 ft). It is endemic to the northwest Pacific Ocean.
