= List of things named after A. P. J. Abdul Kalam =

A. P. J. Abdul Kalam was an Indian aerospace scientist and statesman who served as president of India from 2002 to 2007. Born in Rameswaram in Southern India, Kalam spent four decades as a scientist and science administrator, mainly at the Defence Research and Development Organisation and Indian Space Research Organisation and was intimately involved in India's civilian space programme and military missile development efforts. He was known as the "Missile Man of India" for his work on the development of ballistic missile and launch vehicle technology. He also played a pivotal organisational, technical, and political role in India's Pokhran-II nuclear tests in 1998.

He was elected as the president of India in 2002 and was widely referred to as the "People's President". He engaged in teaching, writing and public service after his presidency. He was a recipient of several awards, including the Bharat Ratna, India's highest civilian honour.

Kalam's birthday (15 October) is celebrated as World Students' Day in India. In 2015, the Government of Tamil Nadu announced that Kalam's birthday would be observed as "Youth Renaissance Day".

== Awards and grants ==
- In September 2014, India and the United States launched the Fulbright-Kalam climate fellowship which enabled six Indian doctoral students and researchers to work with institutions in the US for a period of 6–12 months.
- In 2015, the Government of Tamil Nadu instituted the "Dr. A. P. J. Abdul Kalam Award" constituting a gold medal, a certificate and ₹500,000 (US$5,200), to be awarded annually on the Indian Independence Day, to residents of the state with achievements in promoting scientific growth, the humanities or the welfare of students.

== Institutions ==
- A.P.J. Abdul Kalam Centre, a state-sponsored organization in Assam.
- Dr APJ Abdul Kalam Missile Complex, a military research institute in Hyderabad.
- Dr. A. P. J. Abdul Kalam Science City in Patna.
- Dr. Abdul Kalam Science Centre and Planetarium in Puducherry.
- Dr. Kalam Smriti International Science and Space Museum at Kochi.

=== Universities ===
- APJ Abdul Kalam Technological University, a state university in Thiruvananthapuram
- Dr. A.P.J. Abdul Kalam Technical University, a public collegiate university in Lucknow.
- Dr. A.P.J. Abdul Kalam University, a private university in Indore.

=== Colleges ===
- Bharat Ratna Dr. A.P.J. Abdul Kalam Government Arts and Science College in Rameswaram.
- A. P. J. Abdul Kalam Memorial Institute of Digestive Diseases in Kollam,
- Dr. A.P.J. Abdul Kalam Government College in Kolkata.
- Dr. A. P. J. Abdul Kalam Lecture Theatre at Netaji Subhas University of Technology in Delhi.
- Dr. APJ Abdul Kalam UIT at Jhabua.
- Dr. Kalam Agricultural College in Kishanganj.
- Kalam academic complex at Mahatma Gandhi University in Kottayam.
- Kalam Institute of Health Technology in Visakhapatnam.

== Missiles ==
- BrahMos-II is named as BrahMos-II (K), in which K denotes the first letter of Kalam's name.
- K Missile family, is a family of submarine-launched ballistic missiles (SLBM) is named after Kalam.

== Places ==
- In August 2015, a prominent road in New Delhi was renamed as Dr APJ Abdul Kalam Road.
- In September 2015, the national missile test site in Odisha in Wheeler Island was renamed as Abdul Kalam Island.
- In October 2015, a 6,180 m (20,280 ft) peak near the Bara Shigri Glacier in the Himalayas was named as Mount Kalam.

== Science ==
- In 2017, researchers at the NASA's Jet Propulsion Laboratory discovered a new bacterium on the filters of the International Space Station and named it Solibacillus kalamii.
- In February 2018, scientists from the Botanical Survey of India named a newly found plant species as Drypetes kalamii.
- In 2022, a newly discovered species of footballfish was named as Himantolophus kalami.
- In 2023, a newly discovered tardigrade was named Batillipes kalami after him.

== Others ==
- Abdul Kalam Vision India Party, a political party launched on 28 February 2016.

== See also ==
- List of awards and honours received by A. P. J. Abdul Kalam
- List of things named after presidents of India
