= Himantolophus brevirostris =

Conservation status
- Data Deficient (IUCN 3.1)

Scientific classification
- Domain: Eukaryota
- Kingdom: Animalia
- Phylum: Chordata
- Class: Actinopterygii
- Order: Lophiiformes
- Family: Himantolophidae
- Genus: Himantolophus
- Species: H. brevirostris

Binomial name
- Himantolophus brevirostris Regan, 1925

Species of fish

Himantolophus brevirostris is a species of footballfish, a type of anglerfish. The fish is bathypelagic and can be found as deep as 3,000 metres (9,800 ft). It is endemic to the north Atlantic Ocean. So far, only males of the species have been found.
