= Himantolophus azurlucens =

Scientific classification
- Domain: Eukaryota
- Kingdom: Animalia
- Phylum: Chordata
- Class: Actinopterygii
- Order: Lophiiformes
- Family: Himantolophidae
- Genus: Himantolophus
- Species: H. azurlucens

Binomial name
- Himantolophus azurlucens Beebe & Crane, 1947

Species of fish

Himantolophus azurlucens is a species of footballfish, a type of anglerfish. The fish is bathypelagic and can be found at depths ranging from 900 to 1,100 metres (3,000 to 3,600 ft). It is endemic to the eastern central Pacific Ocean and has been located off the coast of Panama.
