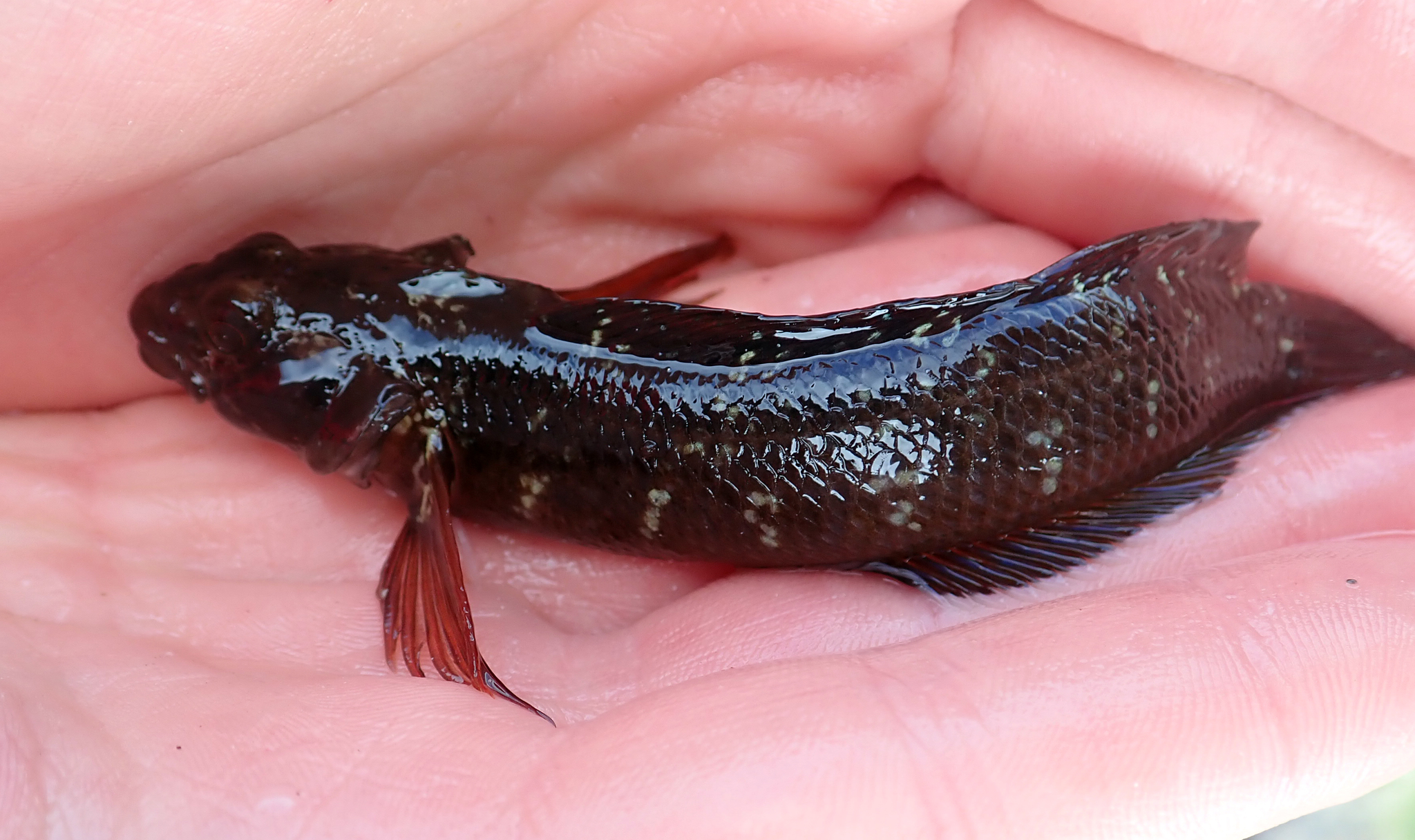

Conservation status
- Least Concern (IUCN 3.1)

Scientific classification
- Kingdom: Animalia
- Phylum: Chordata
- Class: Actinopterygii
- Division: Teleostei
- Order: Blenniiformes
- Family: Tripterygiidae
- Genus: Ruanoho
- Species: R. decemdigitatus

Binomial name
- Ruanoho decemdigitatus (Clarke, 1879)

Synonyms
- Trypterigium decemdigitatus Clarke, 1879; Gilloblennius decemdigitatus (Clarke, 1879)

= Ruanoho decemdigitatus =

Species of fish

Ruanoho decemgitatus, the longfinned triplefin, is a species of fish in the family Tripterygiidae. It is endemic to New Zealand. It is marine fish that occurs in shallow water (maximum depth 10 m) on rocks and cobbles on silty reefs in semi-sheltered areas. It can grow to 12 cm (4.7 in) total length.

== Taxonomy ==
This species was first described by Frank Edward Clarke in 1879 using a specimen from Dusky Sound and originally named Trypterigium decemdigitatus. This species was placed in the genus Gilloblennius in 1938, with Gilbert Percy Whitley accepting this placement in 1964. In 1986 this fish was placed in the genus Ruanoho.
