= Himantolophus compressus =

Conservation status
- Data Deficient (IUCN 3.1)

Scientific classification
- Domain: Eukaryota
- Kingdom: Animalia
- Phylum: Chordata
- Class: Actinopterygii
- Order: Lophiiformes
- Family: Himantolophidae
- Genus: Himantolophus
- Species: H. compressus

Binomial name
- Himantolophus compressus Osório, 1912

Species of fish

Himantolophus compressus is a species of footballfish, a type of anglerfish. The fish is bathypelagic and non-migratory; it can be found in the Atlantic Ocean off the coast of Madeira and southern Portugal.

The species is known only from the holotype, now lost. The specimen had a length of 130 mm.
