= Himantolophus stewarti =

Stewart's footballfish

Scientific classification
- Domain: Eukaryota
- Kingdom: Animalia
- Phylum: Chordata
- Class: Actinopterygii
- Order: Lophiiformes
- Family: Himantolophidae
- Genus: Himantolophus
- Species: H. stewarti

Binomial name
- Himantolophus stewarti Pietsch & Kenaley, 2011

Species of fish

The Stewart's footballfish (Himantolophus stewarti) is a species of footballfish, a type of anglerfish. The fish is bathydemersal and has been found at depths ranging from 400 to 1,413 metres (1,312 to 4,636 ft). The species has mainly been found in the Tasman Sea, though it is likely to be endemic to the same areas as Himantolophus appelii.
