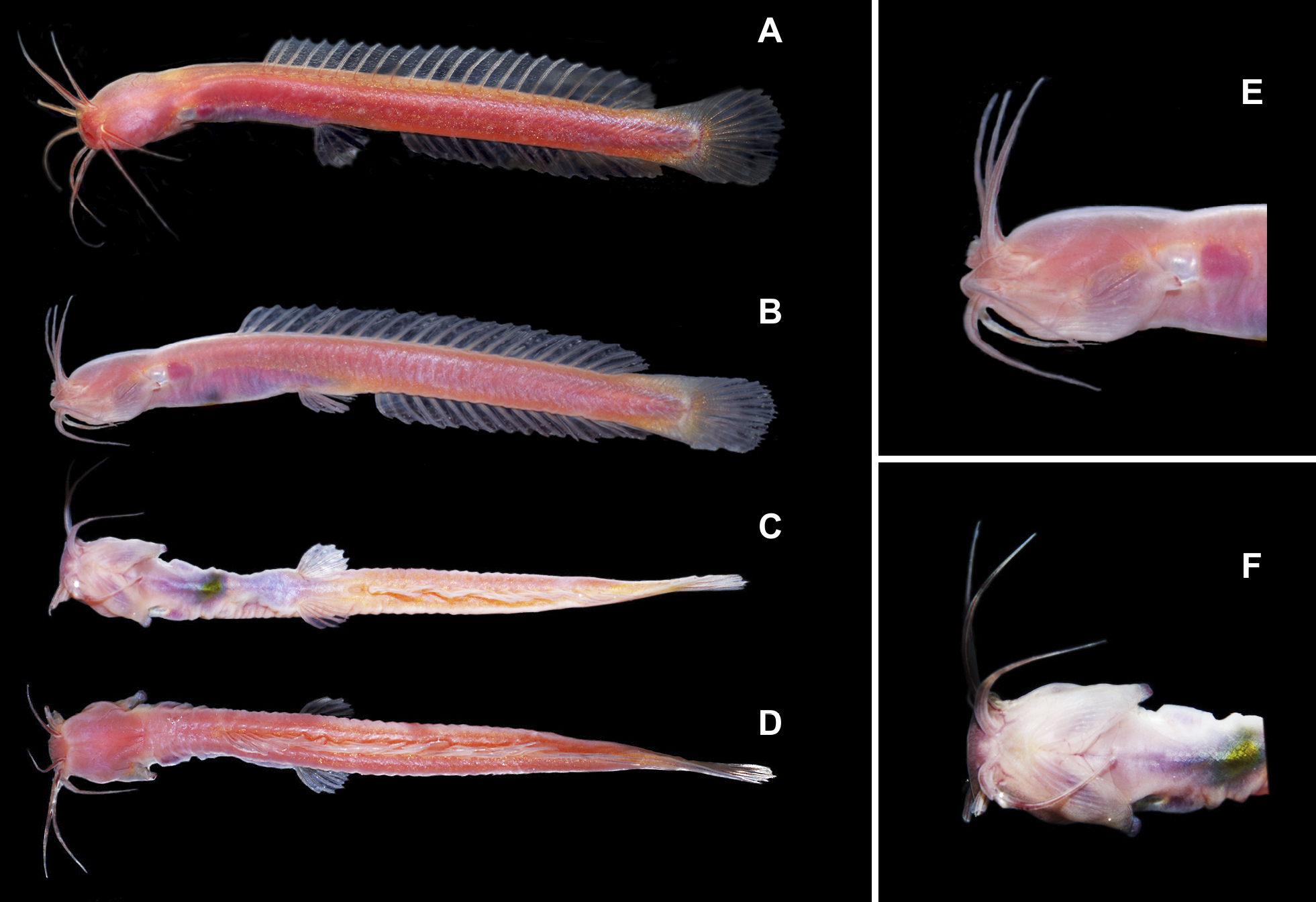
- Holotype: A in life and B–F immediately after preservation. A, B Lateral view; C ventral view; D dorsal view; E lateral view of head; F ventral view of head.

Scientific classification
- Kingdom: Animalia
- Phylum: Chordata
- Class: Actinopterygii
- Order: Siluriformes
- Family: Clariidae
- Genus: Horaglanis
- Species: H. populi

Binomial name
- Horaglanis populi Raghavan, R. L. Sundar, C. P. Arjun, Britz and Dahanukar, 2023

= Horaglanis populi =

Species of fish

Horaglanis populi is a species of airbreathing catfish endemic to India, mainly in wells and underground water channels around Pathanamthitta District, Kerala. It lacks pigmentation and eyes, like other cavefish, Like other species of similar catfishes found in Kerala, it is also obtained from wells dug through laterite. Horaglanis populi has an elongated body that comes with a round cross-section anteriorly which also comes with a large head that excludes eyes. The head has a wide mouth a truncated snout and four pairs of barbels which are two mandibular pairs, one nasal pair, and one maxillary pair.

== Etymology ==
The fish's name means in Latin of populus, people, honoring the “invaluable contributions made by interested members of the public in the southern Indian state of Kerala", in "helping to document the biodiversity of subterranean and groundwater systems, including the discovery” of this catfish.
