= Günther Maul =

German-Portuguese ichthyologist

Günther Edmund Maul (May 7, 1909 – September 28, 1997) was a German ichthyologist and taxidermist in Portugal. Maul came to Madeira in December 1930 to work as taxidermist at Museu Municipal do Funchal, which opened to the public in 1933. He was appointed director for the museum in 1940, a post that he held to his retirement in 1979. He, however, continued his research until shortly before his death. He started two journals (Boletim do Museu Municipal do Funchal in 1945 and Bocagiana in 1959) and opened the museum's aquarium to the public in 1959. He also participated in several expeditions including with the French bathyscaphe Archimède in 1966 and organised the first multidisciplinary expedition to the Salvage Islands in 1963. He was awarded an honorary doctorate from the University of Madeira in 1995.

== Works ==
He described several species of fish

- Himantolophus albinares
- Coryphaenoides thelestomus
- Macruronus maderensis
- Rouleina maderensis
- Argyripnus atlanticus

== Taxon described by him ==
- See Category:Taxa named by Günther Maul

== Taxon named in his honor ==
Maul has at least three species and one genus of fish

- Himantolophus mauli Bertelsen & Krefft, 1988
- Pollichthys mauli (Poll, 1953)
- Maulisia mauli Parr, 1960),
- Mauligobius
- one fossil owl (Otus mauli)
- and one moth (Acrolepiopsis mauli) named in his honour.
