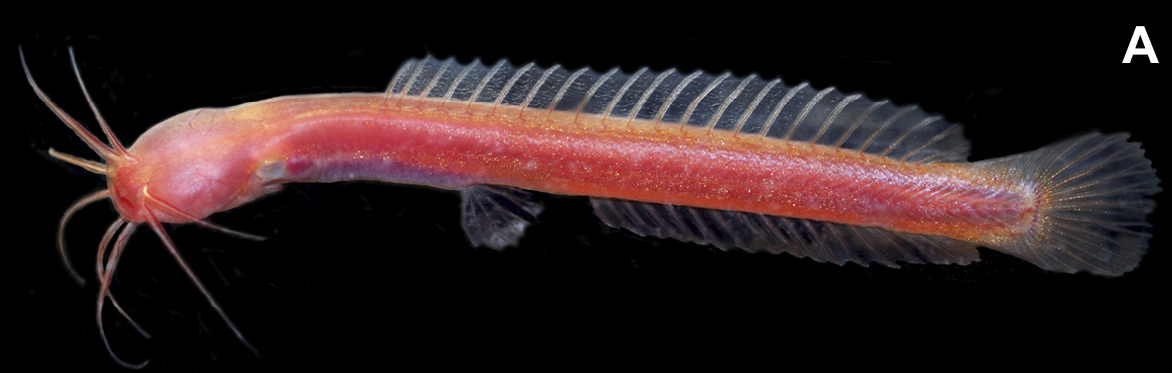
- Horaglanis populi

Scientific classification
- Kingdom: Animalia
- Phylum: Chordata
- Class: Actinopterygii
- Division: Teleostei
- Order: Siluriformes
- Family: Clariidae
- Genus: Horaglanis; Menon, 1950

Type species
- Horaglanis krishnai Menon, 1950

= Horaglanis =

Genus of fishes

Horaglanis is a genus of small airbreathing catfishes that are endemic to Kerala in India. The four known species are all adapted to life underground, lack pigmentation and are blind.

This genus and Kryptoglanis, both from the Western Ghats, are the only known underground-living catfish in India.

== Etymology ==
The genus is named in honor of Indian ichthyologist Sunder Lal Hora (1896–1955), the Director, of the Zoological Survey of India.

== Species ==
There are currently four recognized species in this genus:

- Horaglanis abdulkalami Subhash Babu, 2012
- Horaglanis alikunhii Subhash Babu & C. K. G. Nayar, 2004
- Horaglanis krishnai Menon, 1950 (Indian blind catfish)
- Horaglanis populi Raghavan, Remya L Sundar, CP Arjun, Britz and Dahanukar, 2023
