= Himantolophus albinares =

Conservation status
- Data Deficient (IUCN 3.1)

Scientific classification
- Domain: Eukaryota
- Kingdom: Animalia
- Phylum: Chordata
- Class: Actinopterygii
- Order: Lophiiformes
- Family: Himantolophidae
- Genus: Himantolophus
- Species: H. albinares

Binomial name
- Himantolophus albinares Maul, 1961

Species of fish

Himantolophus albinares is a species of footballfish, a type of anglerfish. The fish is bathypelagic and can be found at depths ranging from 330 to 1,950 metres (1,080 to 6,400 ft). It is endemic to the Atlantic Ocean. As of 1999, a total of four specimens had been found.
