= Horaglanis krishnai =

Indian blind catfish

Conservation status
- Data Deficient (IUCN 3.1)

Scientific classification
- Kingdom: Animalia
- Phylum: Chordata
- Class: Actinopterygii
- Order: Siluriformes
- Family: Clariidae
- Genus: Horaglanis
- Species: H. krishnai

Binomial name
- Horaglanis krishnai Menon, 1950

Species of fish

Horaglanis krishnai, the Indian blind catfish, is a species of airbreathing catfish endemic to India, mainly in wells and underground water channels around Kottayam, Kerala. It lacks pigmentation and eyes, like other cavefish, and reaches about 4.2 cm (1.7 inches) in total length.

== Etymology ==
The fish is named in honor of Mr. N. Krishna Pillay, who collected the holotype after draining a well in 1948.
