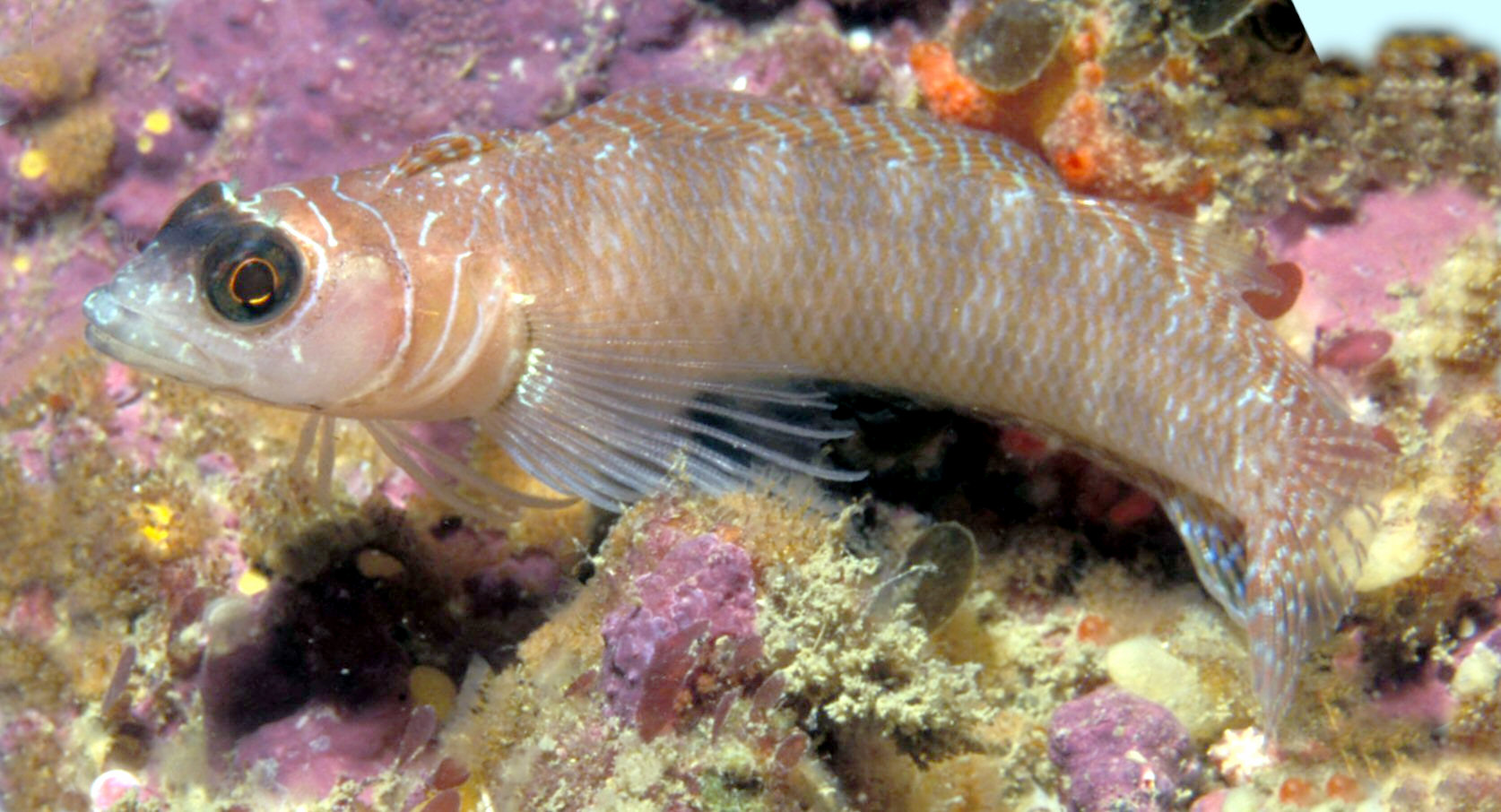

Conservation status
- Least Concern (IUCN 3.1)

Scientific classification
- Kingdom: Animalia
- Phylum: Chordata
- Class: Actinopterygii
- Order: Blenniiformes
- Family: Tripterygiidae
- Genus: Ruanoho
- Species: R. whero

Binomial name
- Ruanoho whero Hardy, 1986

= Spectacled triplefin =

Species of fish

The spectacled triplefin (Ruanoho whero) is a triplefin in the genus Ruanoho. It is commonly found around New Zealand from depths of a few metres to about 30 m, most common in reef areas of broken rock. Its length is between 4 and 8 cm and its head is flattened with large eyes surrounded by a dark band giving rise to its common name. The head and fins have a pattern of fine blue lines. Its large pectoral fins are used as props when resting on the bottom where it spends most of its time.

In the breeding season in winter and spring the males become darker, with a blue/black head and black first dorsal fin, and dark bars on the body.

The specific name is a Māori word meaning "red", a reference to the diagonal reddish striping on its body.
