= Himantolophus litoceras =

Scientific classification
- Domain: Eukaryota
- Kingdom: Animalia
- Phylum: Chordata
- Class: Actinopterygii
- Order: Lophiiformes
- Family: Himantolophidae
- Genus: Himantolophus
- Species: H. litoceras

Binomial name
- Himantolophus litoceras A. L. Stewart & Pietsch, 2010

Species of fish

Himantolophus litoceras is a species of footballfish, a type of anglerfish. The fish is bathydemersal and has been found at a depth of 654 metres (2,146 ft). It is endemic to the waters surrounding New Zealand.

This fish was first described in 2010 by Andrew Stewart and Theodore Pietsch, from a single specimen taken in seas off the northernmost tip of New Zealand's North Island. The species epithet, litoceras, derives from two Greek words, litos ("simple" or "plain") and keras ("horn") and describes the species escal appendages as being simple.
