= Horaglanis alikunhii =

Scientific classification
- Domain: Eukaryota
- Kingdom: Animalia
- Phylum: Chordata
- Class: Actinopterygii
- Order: Siluriformes
- Family: Clariidae
- Genus: Horaglanis
- Species: H. alikunhii

Binomial name
- Horaglanis alikunhii Subhash Babu & C. K. G. Nayar, 2004
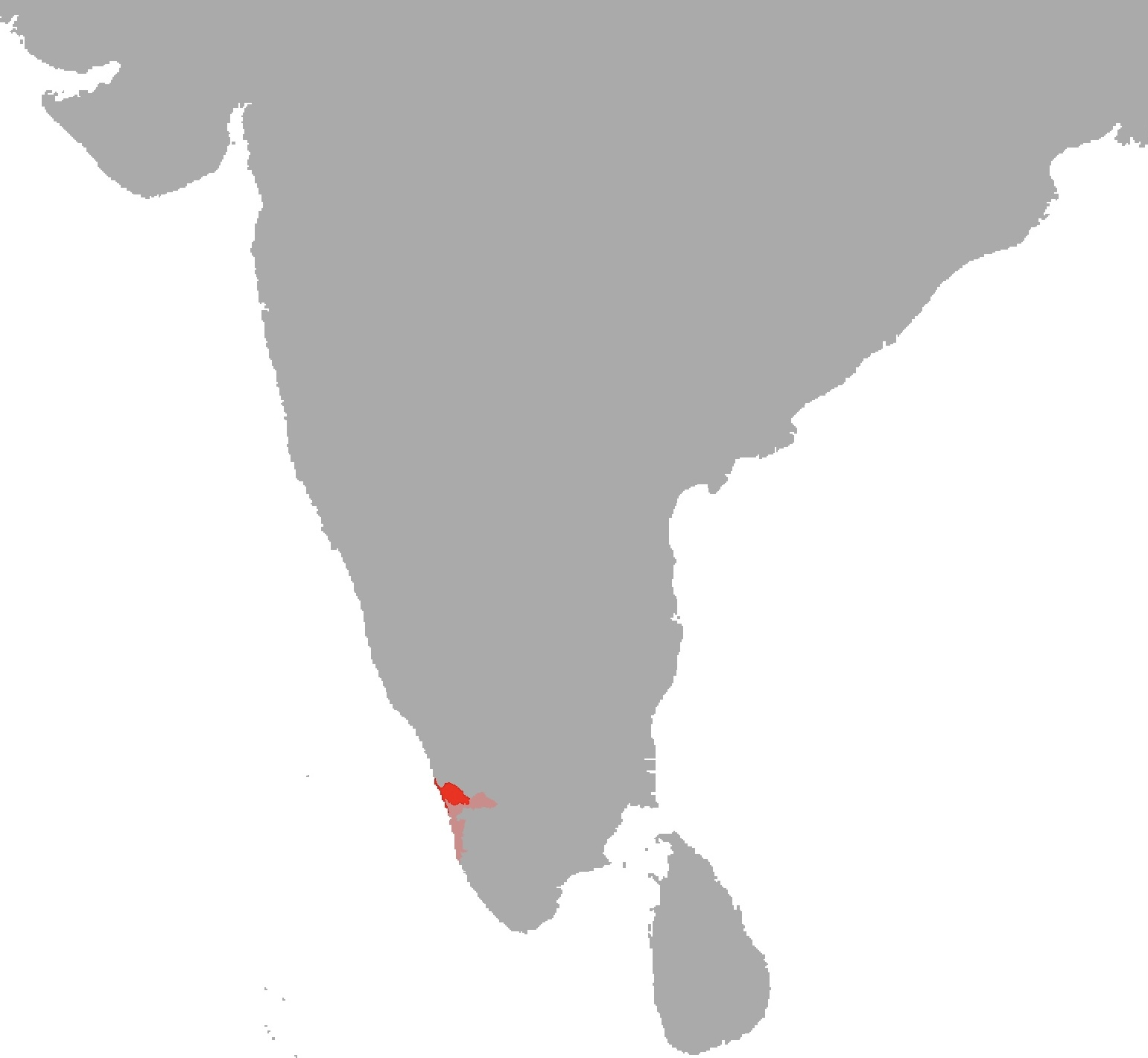

Species of fish

Horaglanis alikunhii is a species of airbreathing catfish endemic to India. It was described by Subhash Babu Kallikadavil and Nayar in 2004.

== Etymology ==
The fish is named in honor of Indian aquaculturist Kolliyil Hameed Alikunhi (1918–2010), because of his contributions to fishery science in general and the Indian fisheries in particular.
