= Nemamyxine kreffti =

Conservation status
- Near Threatened (IUCN 3.1)

Scientific classification
- Kingdom: Animalia
- Phylum: Chordata
- Infraphylum: Agnatha
- Superclass: Cyclostomi
- Class: Myxini
- Order: Myxiniformes
- Family: Myxinidae
- Genus: Nemamyxine
- Species: N. kreffti

Binomial name
- Nemamyxine kreffti C. B. McMillan & Wisner, 1982

Species of jawless fish

Nemamyxine kreffti, also known as Krefft's hagfish, is a species of fish in the hagfish family Myxinidae. It is found in the south-western Atlantic Ocean from off Argentina and southern Brazil.

== Description ==
This species reaches a length of 40.0 cm (15.7 in).

== Etymology ==
The fish is named in honor of German ichthyologist-herpetologist Gerhard Krefft (1912‒1993), Institute für Seefischerei in Hamburg.
