= Nemamyxine elongata =

Conservation status
- Data Deficient (IUCN 3.1)

Scientific classification
- Kingdom: Animalia
- Phylum: Chordata
- Infraphylum: Agnatha
- Superclass: Cyclostomi
- Class: Myxini
- Order: Myxiniformes
- Family: Myxinidae
- Genus: Nemamyxine
- Species: N. elongata

Binomial name
- Nemamyxine elongata L. R. Richardson, 1958

Species of jawless fish

Nemamyxine elongata, the bootlace hagfish, is a species of hagfish in the genus Nemamyxine. Distribution, abundance, and natural history are not known. Only two specimens have been collected. One was found dead in a net in the Kaituna River (Bay of Plenty), and thought to have been a fishery discard. The other was collected alive during a trawl at 132-140m in the Canterbury Bight (East coast of South Island). The larger specimen was 867 mm TL but maximum size is unknown. One specimen was a female with small eggs similar to those of other hagfish species..
