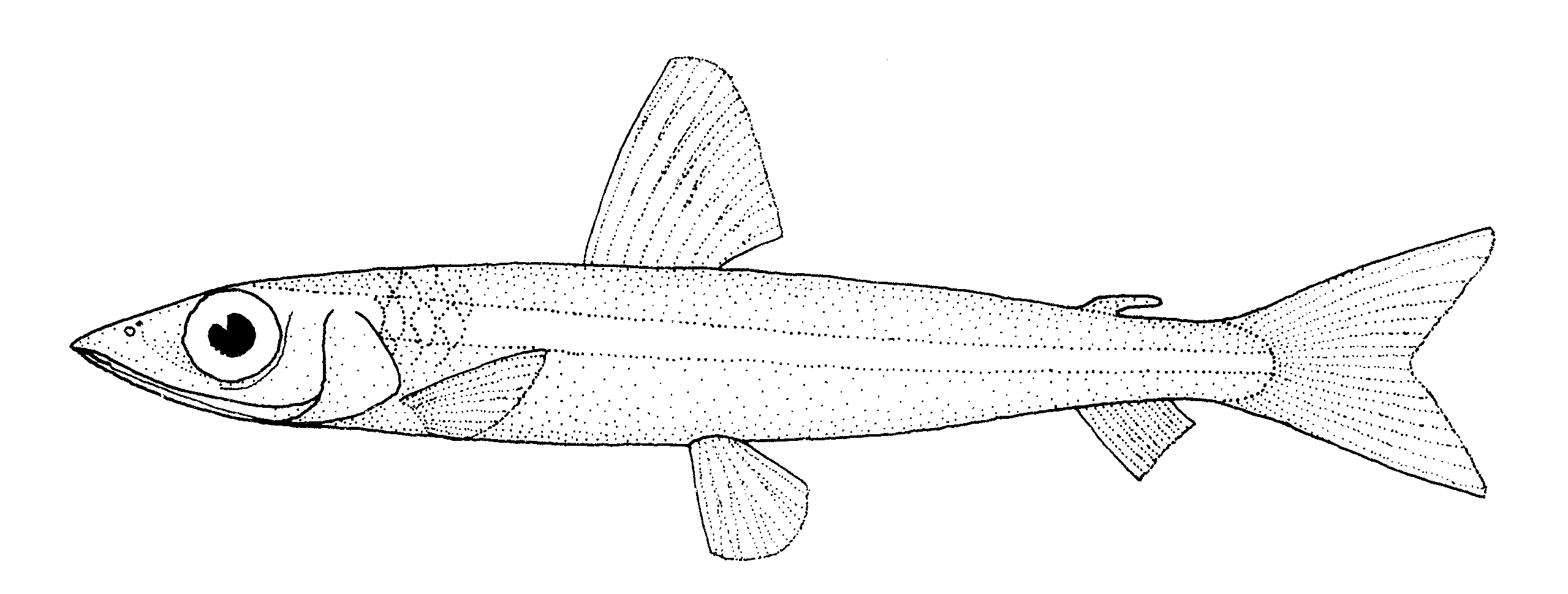
- Drawing by Dr Tony Ayling

Scientific classification
- Domain: Eukaryota
- Kingdom: Animalia
- Phylum: Chordata
- Class: Actinopterygii
- Order: Argentiniformes
- Family: Argentinidae
- Genus: Argentina
- Species: A. elongata

Binomial name
- Argentina elongata F. W. Hutton, 1879

= Argentina elongata =

Species of fish

Argentina elongata is a species of fish in the family Argentinidae endemic to New Zealand, at depths of between 69 and 600 m (226 and 1,969 ft). Its length is up to 25.0 centimetres (9.8 in). It is a species of minor importance to local commercial fisheries.

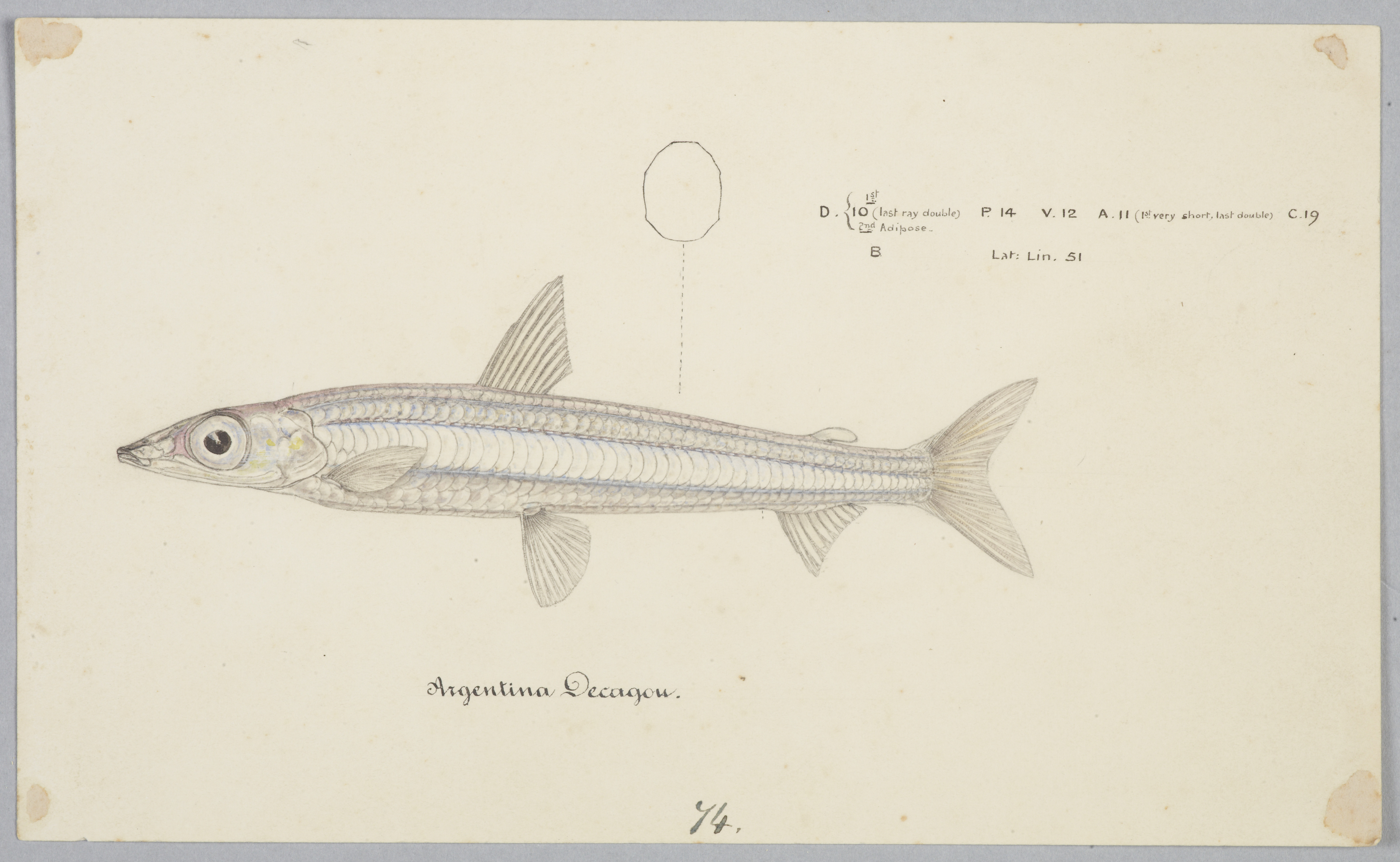
A. elongata by Frank Edward Clarke
