= Nemamyxine =

Scientific classification
- Kingdom: Animalia
- Phylum: Chordata
- Infraphylum: Agnatha
- Superclass: Cyclostomi
- Class: Myxini
- Order: Myxiniformes
- Family: Myxinidae
- Subfamily: Myxininae
- Genus: Nemamyxine; L. R. Richardson 1958

Type species
- Nemamyxine elongata Richardson 1958

Genus of jawless fishes

Nemamyxine is a genus of hagfish.

== Species ==
Two recognized species are placed in this genus:

- Nemamyxine elongata L. R. Richardson, 1958 (bootlace hagfish)
- Nemamyxine kreffti C. B. McMillan & Wisner, 1982 (Krefft's hagfish)
