= Abdul Kalam Vision India Party =

- Founder: V.Ponraj
- Founded: 28 February 2016

Abdul Kalam Vision India Party was an Indian political party, formally launched on 28 February 2016. The party was launched in the name of former president A. P. J. Abdul Kalam, by V. Ponraj, who was the scientific adviser to Kalam. However, the family of A.P.J. Abdul Kalam expressed their displeasure over the party using Kalam's name and portrait.

Prelude to the declaration of this political party, a two-day convention was held by United Vision India 2020, inviting V. Ponraj to lead a political party was conducted on 26 February 2016 without the presence of V. Ponraj and in the presence of V. Ponraj on 27 February 2016. This convention was conducted before the house of V. Ponraj at Thonugal village, as he was hesitant to enter politics, despite the fact he was insisted by various people from all the districts in the State of Tamil Nadu for the past so many months. The parponrty has been started to achieve the vision 2020 of Dr. A.P.J.Abdul Kalam. Now this party is merged with Tamil actor Kamal Haasan's Makkal Needhi Maiam.
