= Frank Edward Clarke =

New Zealand ichthyologist and scientific illustrator

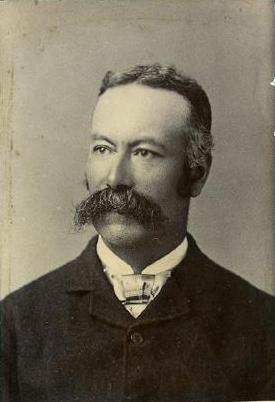
- Born: 20 December 1848; Suffolk, England
- Died: 1 July 1899 (aged 50); New Plymouth, New Zealand
- Occupations: Ichthyologist, Scientific illustrator and draftsman of the Survey Department, New Zealand

Frank Edward Clarke (20 December 1848 – 1 July 1899) was a New Zealand ichthyologist and scientific illustrator. He discovered numerous fish species previously unknown to science and was the third most active describer of those new species in New Zealand from 1870 to 1905. Clarke was also an artist and a collection of his scientific illustrations is held at Museum of New Zealand Te Papa Tongarewa.

== Biography ==
=== Early life ===
Clarke was born in Suffolk, England on 20 December 1848, son of Edward Clarke, Esq., M.D., L.M., M.H.S. and Anne Leah Clarke (nee Clarkson). In early 1876 Clarke was appointed Chief draftsman in the Survey Department in Westland.

=== Scientific and artistic contributions ===
Clarke was a member of the New Zealand Institute, as the Royal Society of New Zealand was then known, and was a trustee of the Westland Institute. He read his scientific papers before the Westland Institute, the Hokitika Literary Society and the Wellington Philosophical Society. His papers would subsequently be forwarded to the New Zealand Institute for publication.

Amongst Clarke's scientific discoveries, he was the first uncover the presence of Himantolophind angelfishes in New Zealand in 1877. Clarke obtained the specimen of Himantolophus appelii, which he described in his scientific paper, from Mr Appel of Hokitika and named the species in his honour.

Clarke also obtained a fish specimen collected on 6 August 1878 by W. Duncan. Clarke subsequently described and named that species as Argentina decagon and forwarded the specimen to the Colonial Museum, now the Museum of New Zealand Te Papa Tongarewa, where it is still kept. However Clarke had been preempted by Frederick Hutton who had described the new species as Argentina elongata in January 1879. Clarke is unlikely to have seen Hutton's description.

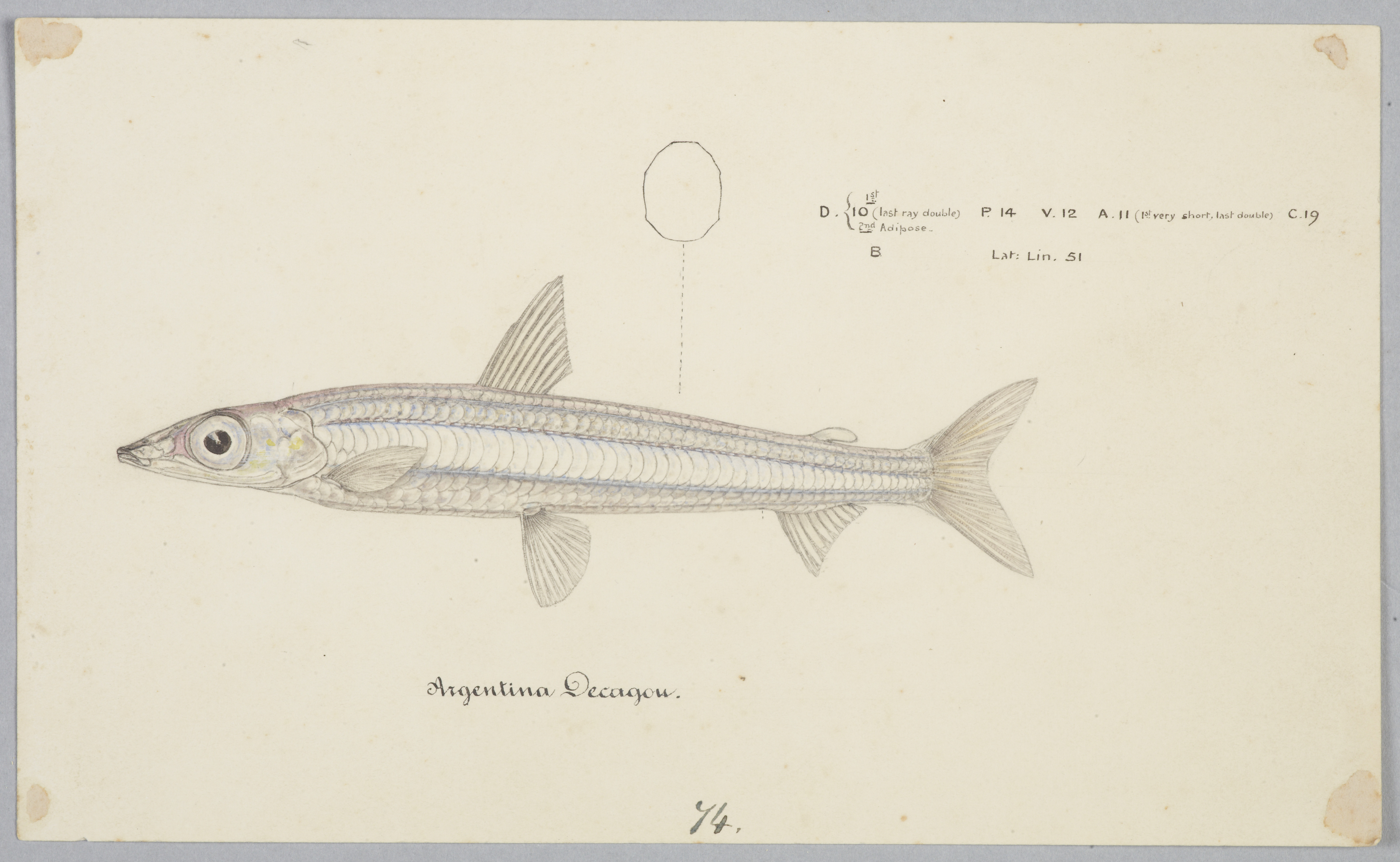
Argentina decagon Clarke, 1879: Silverside, Argentina elongata (Hutton, 1879); New Zealand, by Frank Edward Clarke. Purchased 1921. Te Papa (1992-0035-2278/43)

Some time in or around 1894 Clarke was transferred from the Survey Department in Westland. Prior to him leaving he was presented with an illuminated address by the Mayor of Hokitika on behalf of the citizens of Hokitika. The address expressed their appreciation of Clarke's work and in particular their recognition of his "study and original observations of the fish of this coast".

Sir James Hector is recorded as saying of Clarke that Clarke's "knowledge of fish was minute and accurate, and it would be difficult to exaggerate the beauty and scientific fidelity of his drawings. A special value attached to these drawings inasmuch as some represented rare and others absolutely unique specimens which had come under Mr. Clarke's observation". Hector hoped the collection of Clarke's drawings would be purchased in its complete form by a museum. The Museum of New Zealand Te Papa Tongarewa did in fact purchase Clarke's drawings and watercolours from his wife in 1921.

Clarke also designed the common seal for the Municipal Corporation of Kumara.

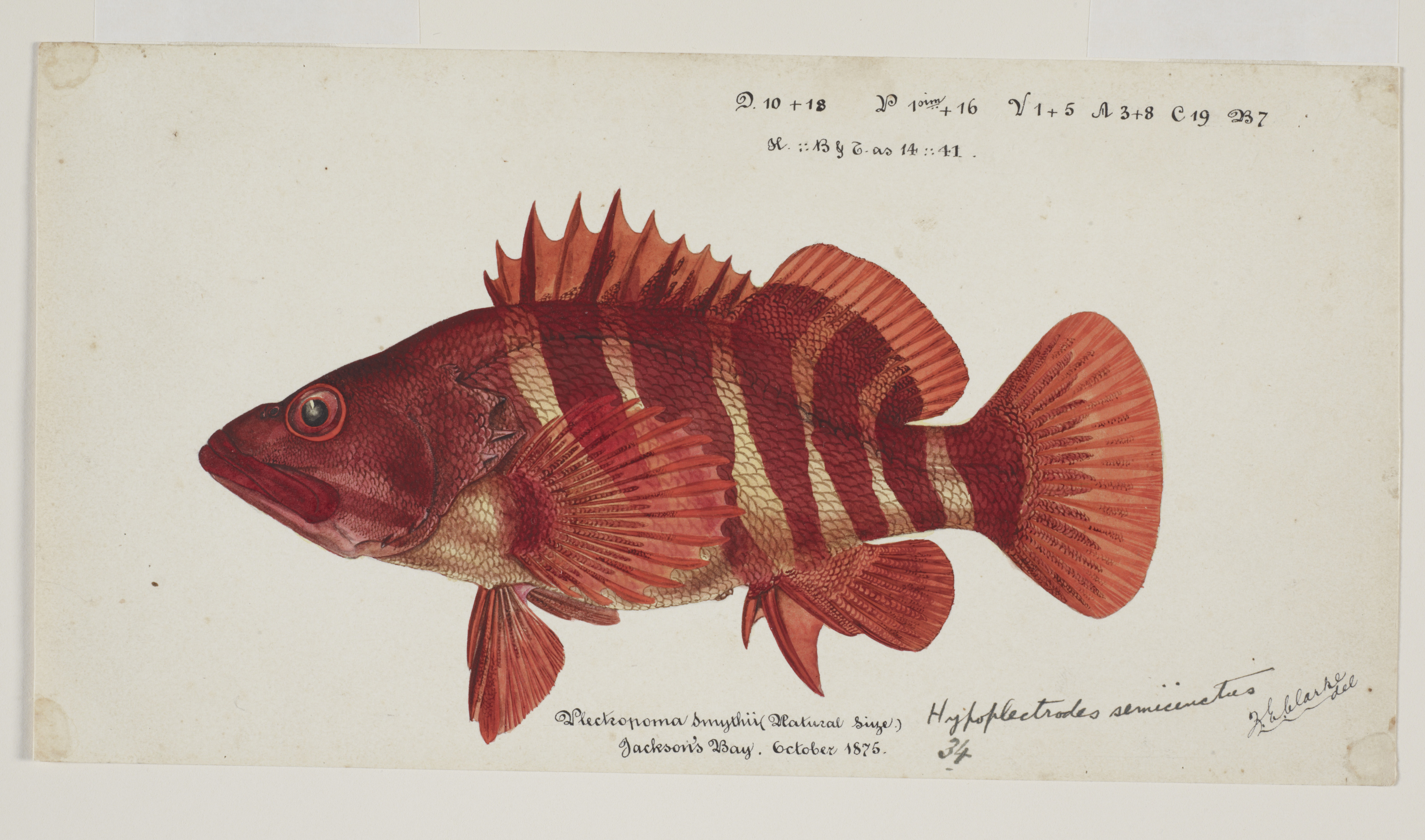
Hypoplectrodes semicinctum, 1875, New Zealand, by Frank Edward Clarke. Purchased 1921. Te Papa (1992-0035-2278/6)

=== Marriage and children ===
Clarke married Margaret Mulvihill, only daughter of Michael Mulvihill, Esq., of Stafford, on 17 March 1873 at St. Patrick's Church, Ross, West Coast. He and his wife had the following children:

- Ernest Edward Clarke (24 February 1877)
- Norman Frank Clarke (31 March 1881)
- Ruby May Clarke (27 June 1884)
- Margaret Ilma (Birdie) Clarke (6 April 1886)
- Roma Kathleen Clarke (1 May 1888)
- Frank Edward Clarke (18 September 1892)
- Arthur Clarke (24 April 1894 - died in infancy)

=== Death ===
Clarke died in New Plymouth on Saturday, 1 July 1899, of heart disease, and is buried in the Te Henui Cemetery, New Plymouth.

== Published works ==
- Clarke, F. E. (1877) "On two new fishes", Transactions of the New Zealand Institute, 10, 243–246
- Clarke, F. E. (1878) "On a new fish found at Hokitika", Transactions of the New Zealand Institute, 11, 195–199
- Clarke, F. E. (1878) "On some new fishes", Transactions of the New Zealand Institute, 11, 291–295
- Clarke, F. E. (1878) "Notice of a Tadpole found in a drain in Hokitika", Transactions of the New Zealand Institute, 11, 573
- Clarke, F. E. (1880) "Description of a new Species of Trachypterus", Transactions of the New Zealand Institute, 13, 195–199
- Clarke, F. E. (1896) "On two new globe-fish", Transactions of the New Zealand Institute, 29, 243–250
- Clarke, F. E. (1896) "Notes on the occurrences of a species of Lophotes on the coast of Taranaki", Transactions of the New Zealand Institute, 29, 251–252
- Clarke, F. E. (1897) "Notes on occurrence of Regalecus argenteus on the Taranaki coast", Transactions of the New Zealand Institute, 30, 254–256
- Clarke, F. E. (1898) "Notes on New Zealand galaxidae, more especially those of the western slopes: with descriptions of new species, etc", Transactions of the New Zealand Institute, 31, 78–91
- Clarke, F. E. (1898) "Notes on Parore (the mangrove fish)", Transactions of the New Zealand Institute, 31, 96–101
- Clarke, F. E. (1900) "Triangular teeth amongst Maoris", The Journal of the Polynesian Society, Vol. 9, No. 2, 121–124

== See also ==
- Category:Taxa named by Frank Edward Clarke
