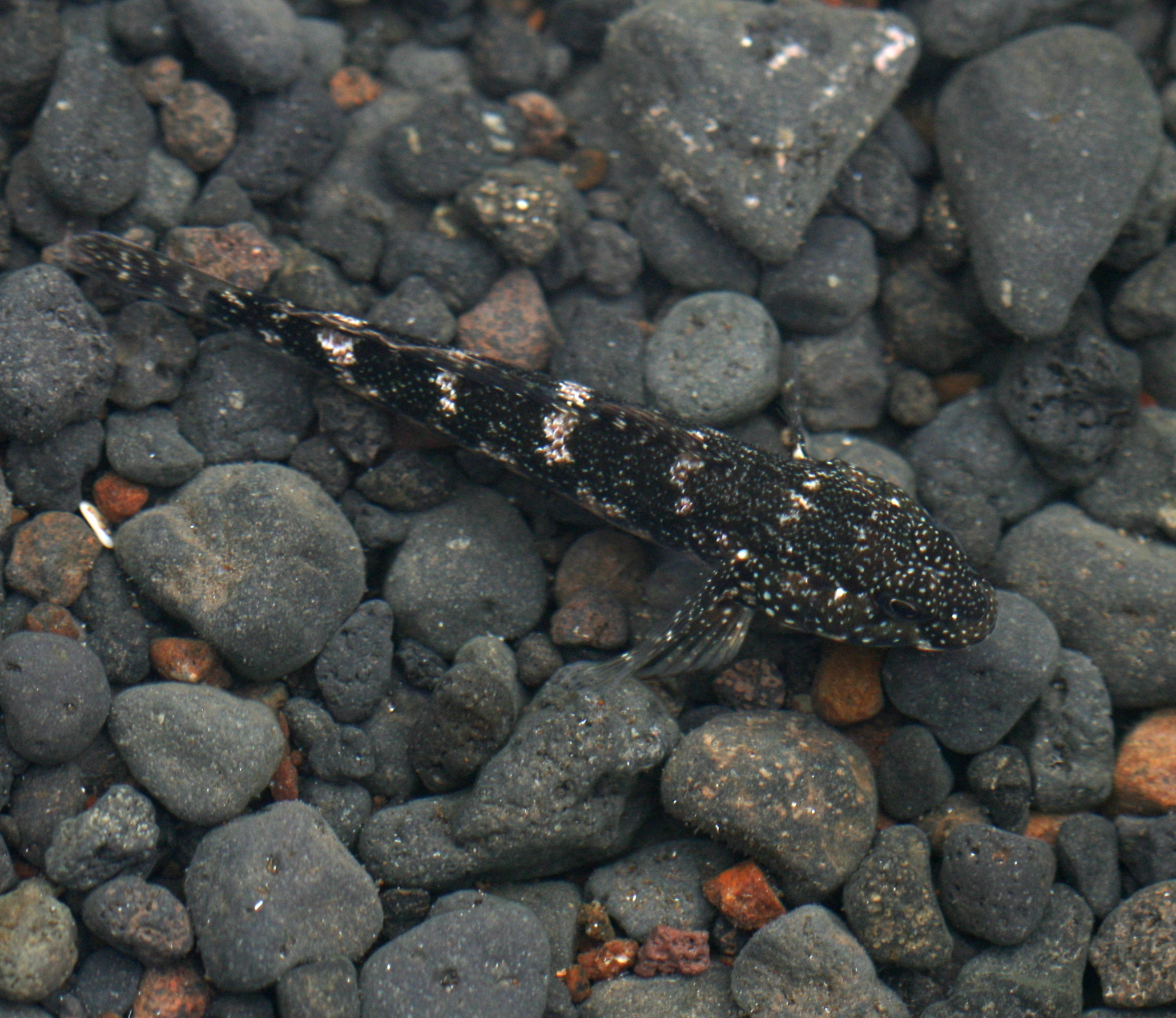
- Mauligobius maderensis

Scientific classification
- Kingdom: Animalia
- Phylum: Chordata
- Class: Actinopterygii
- Order: Gobiiformes
- Family: Gobiidae
- Genus: Mauligobius; P. J. Miller, 1984

Type species
- Gobius maderensis Valenciennes, 1837

= Mauligobius =

Genus of fishes

Mauligobius is a genus of ray-finned fish from the family Gobiidae native to the eastern Atlantic Ocean. The name of this genus honours the ichthyologist and taxidermist Günther Edmund Maul (1909-1997) of the Museu Municipal do Funchal on Madeira for his assistance in making material and information available which the author, Peter Miller, used in his research on Macaronesian gobies.

== Species ==
There are currently two recognized species in this genus:

- Mauligobius maderensis (Valenciennes, 1837)
- Mauligobius nigri (Günther, 1861)
