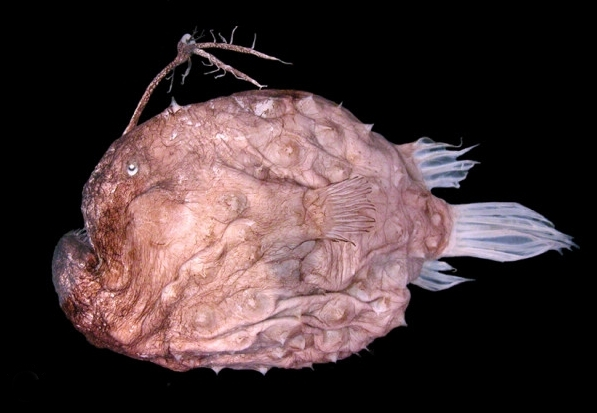

Scientific classification
- Kingdom: Animalia
- Phylum: Chordata
- Class: Actinopterygii
- Order: Lophiiformes
- Family: Himantolophidae
- Genus: Himantolophus
- Species: H. appelii

Binomial name
- Himantolophus appelii (F. E. Clarke, 1878)

= Prickly anglerfish =

Species of fish

The prickly anglerfish (Himantolophus appelii) is a footballfish of the family Himantolophidae, found around the world in the southern oceans (apart from eastern Pacific), in deep water. Its length is up to 40 cm (16 in). It is a mesopelagic species.

A specimen was collected on November 14, 2007. It was a female that was collected east of the Falkland Islands at a depth of 292–318 m (958–1,043 ft). The specimen measured 21 cm (8.3 in) in total length and weighed 616 g (21.7 oz).

It was first described in 1878 by Frank Edward Clarke as Aegoeonichthys appelii. The species epithet honours Mr Appel who provided F. E. Clarke with a specimen.

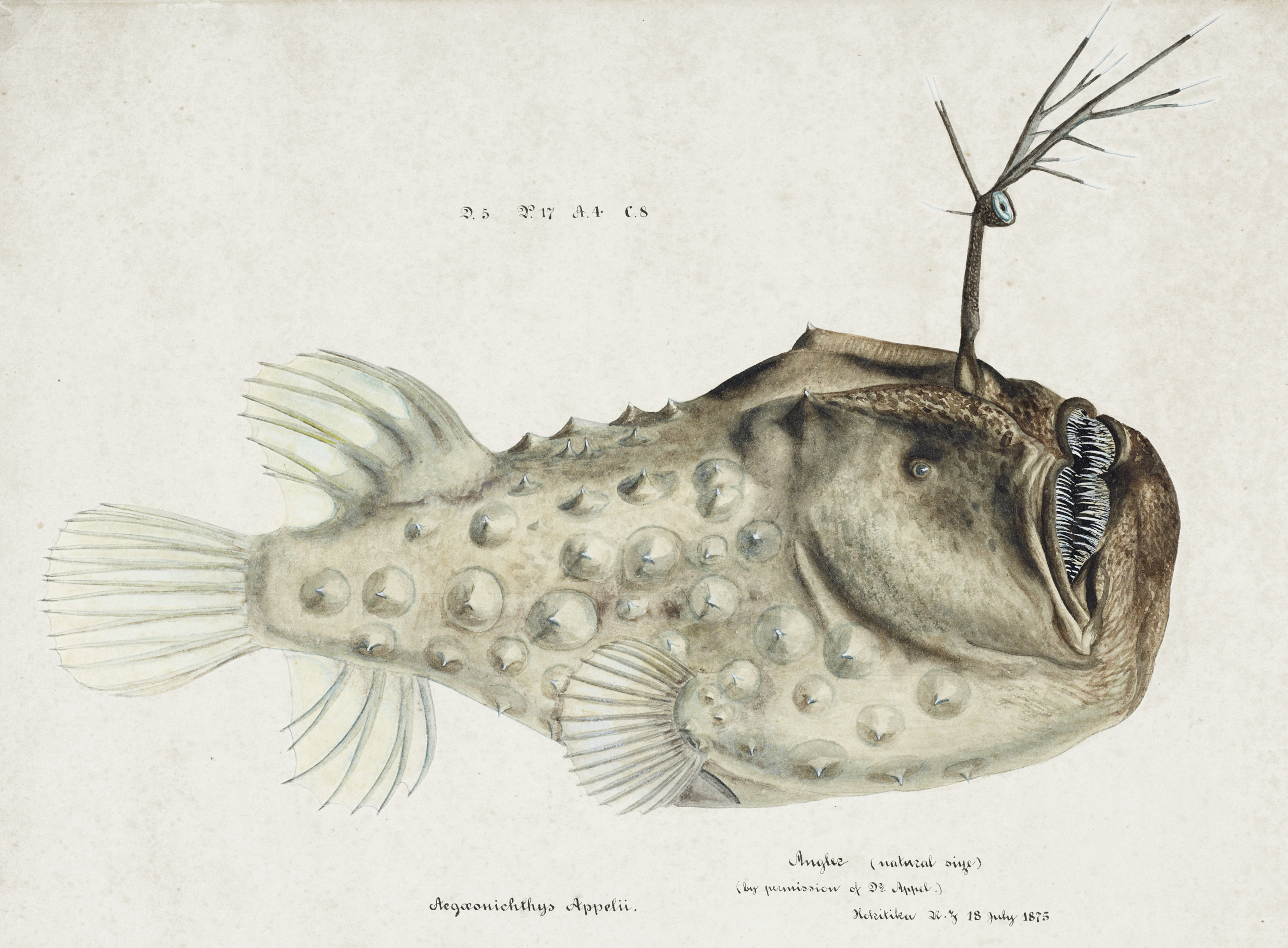
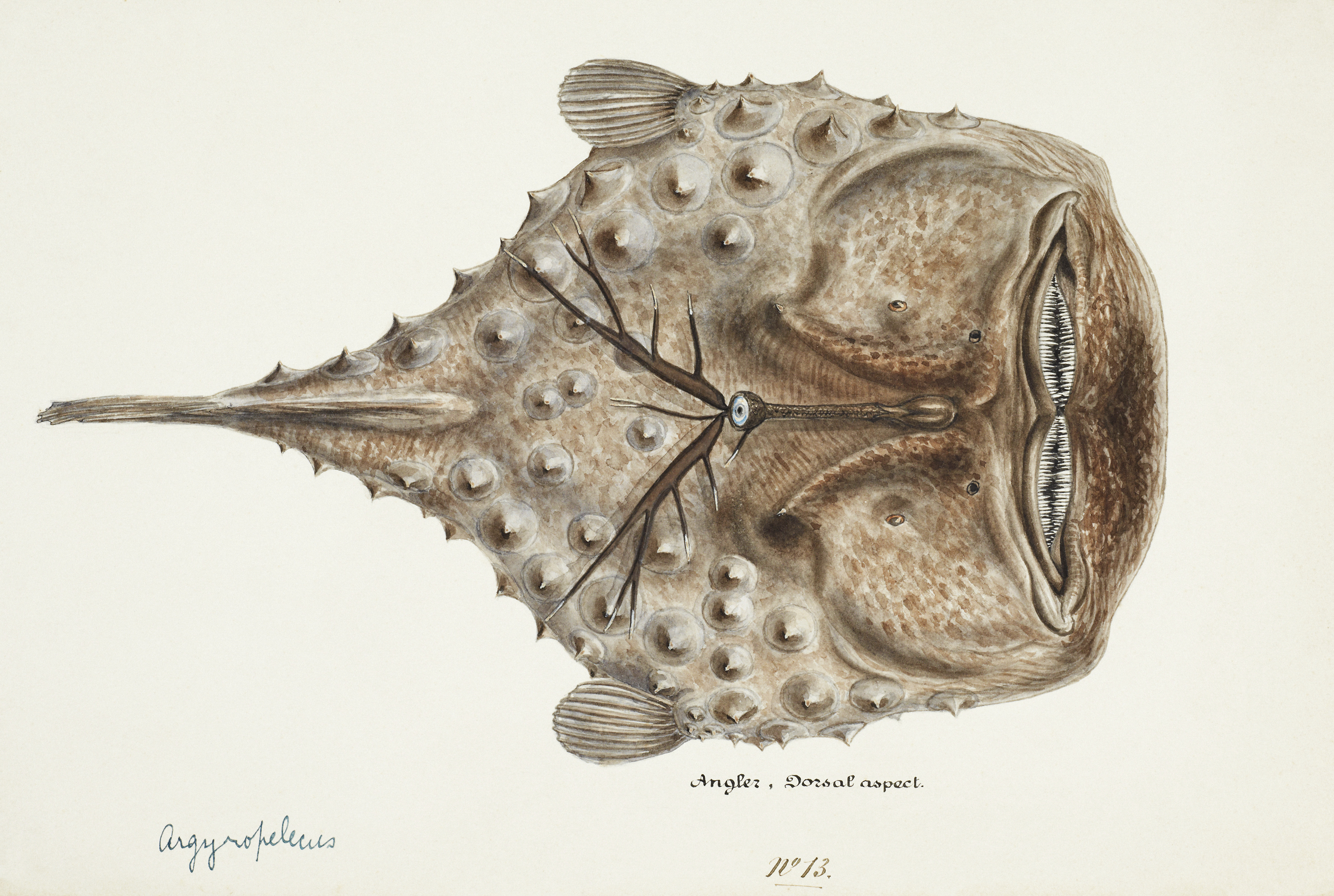
1875 illustrations by F. E. Clarke
