= Gerhard Krefft =

German ichthyologist and herpetologist (1912–1993)

- Born: 30 March 1912; Lokstedt, Hamburg, Germany
- Died: 20 March 1993 (aged 80); Hamburg, Germany
- Education: University of Hamburg
- Spouse: Ingeborg
- Children: 3
- Relatives: zoologist, palaeontologist, Curator of Australian Museum, Gerard Krefft (1830–1881) (great-uncle).
- Scientific career
- Fields: ichthyology, herpetology
- Workplaces: Institute of Sea Fisheries, Hamburg
- Thesis: "Feeding experiments Tritons (Salamandridae), with special emphasis on the uptake of vitamins (1938)
- Doctoral advisor: Paul Erich Berthold Klatt (1885–1958))

Gerhard Krefft (30 March 1912 - 20 March 1993) was a German ichthyologist and herpetologist.

== Family ==
His father was a neurologist, who "was an enthusiastic collector of living reptiles and amphibians", and his mother was a concert singer.

He and his wife Ingeborg were married in 1947, and they had three daughters.

He was the great-nephew of the zoologist, palaeontologist, and Curator of the Australian Museum, Johann Ludwig (Louis) Gerard Krefft (1830–1881).

== Professional career ==
He had more than 160 scientific publications, many of which were "milestone contributions to the taxonomy and zoogeography of oceanic fishes".

== Taxon described by him ==
- See Category:Taxa named by Gerhard Krefft

== Taxon named in his honor ==
- Nemamyxine kreffti C. B. McMillan & Wisner, 1982, the Krefft's hagfish, is a species of hagfish in the genus Nemamyxine. It is found in the Southwest Atlantic Ocean from off Argentina and southern Brazil.
