= Erik Bertelsen =

Danish ichthyologist (1912–1993)

Erik Bertelsen (8 August 1912 – 18 March 1993) was a Danish ichthyologist, who specialised in deep sea fish. The fish, Diaphus bertelseni Nafpaktitis, 1966 is named in his honour.

He studied biology at the University of Copenhagen (1930 -) and in 1937 started work on the Dana collection at Charlottenlund Castle and also for the Danish Fisheries Investigation (DFI). He earned a doctorate in 1951 with his dissertation, The ceratioid fishes. Ontology, taxonomy, distribution and biology. He was director of DFI from 1958 to 1971, when he resigned to work at the zoological museum of the University of Copenhagen, where with fewer administrative duties he was able to concentrate on his research on deep sea fish. In 1961 he was made a Knight of the Order of the Dannebrog.

== Taxon described by him ==
He authored over 50 taxa.

His zoological author abbreviation is Bertelsen.

== Research ==
In 1932 he participated in a fisheries biology research trip to the Faroe Islands and Iceland. In 1933 (as part of the 7th Thule expedition) he carried out benthic studies in the Angmagssalik area, followed by work in 1935 in the south-east Greenland fjords and Icelandic fjords.

== Selected publications ==
- E. Bertelsen; Theodore W. Pietsch (December 2002). "New Species of Deep-Sea Anglerfish of the Genus Gigantactis (Lophiiformes: Gigantactinidae) from the Western North Atlantic Ocean". Copeia. 2002 (4): 958–961. doi:10.1643/0045-8511(2002)002[0958:NSODSA]2.0.CO;2. ISSN 0045-8511. Wikidata Q95667829.
- E. Bertelsen; Theodore W. Pietsch (3 August 1998). "Revision of the Deepsea Anglerfish Genus Rhynchactis Regan (Lophiiformes: Gigantactinidae), with Descriptions of Two New Species". Copeia. 1998 (3): 583. doi:10.2307/1447788. ISSN 0045-8511. Wikidata Q95666490.
- E. Bertelsen; Theodore W. Pietsch (16 May 1996). "Revision of the Ceratioid Anglerfish Genus Lasiognathus (Lophiiformes: Thaumatichthyidae), with the Description of a New Species". Copeia. 1996 (2): 401. doi:10.2307/1446856. ISSN 0045-8511. JSTOR 1446856. Wikidata Q95640983.
- Jørgen G. Nielsen; E. Bertelsen; Åse Jespersen (September 1989). "The Biology of Eurypharynx pelecanoides (Pisces, Eurypharyngidae)". Acta Zoologica. 70 (3): 187–197. doi:10.1111/J.1463-6395.1989.TB01069.X. ISSN 0001-7272. Wikidata Q56883321.

== Taxon named in his honor ==
- Physiculus bertelseni Shcherbachev, 1993 is a bathydemersal fish found in the Western Indian Ocean.

== See also ==
- Taxa named by Erik Bertelsen
