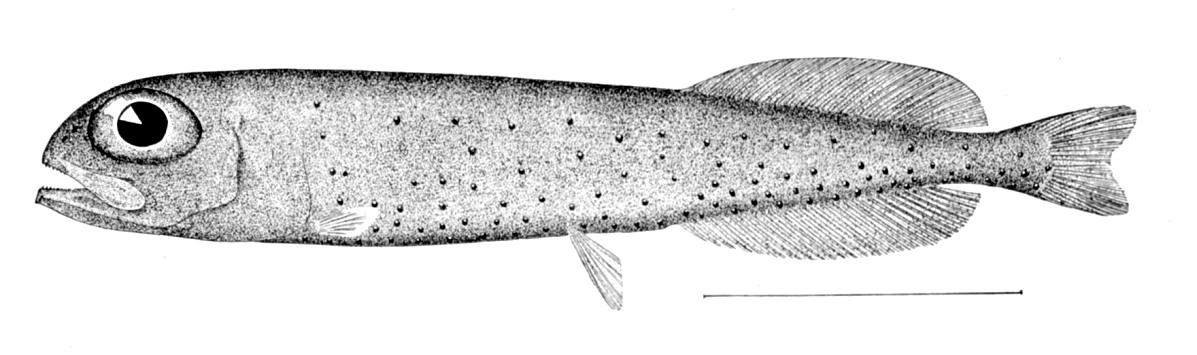
- Fresh specimen
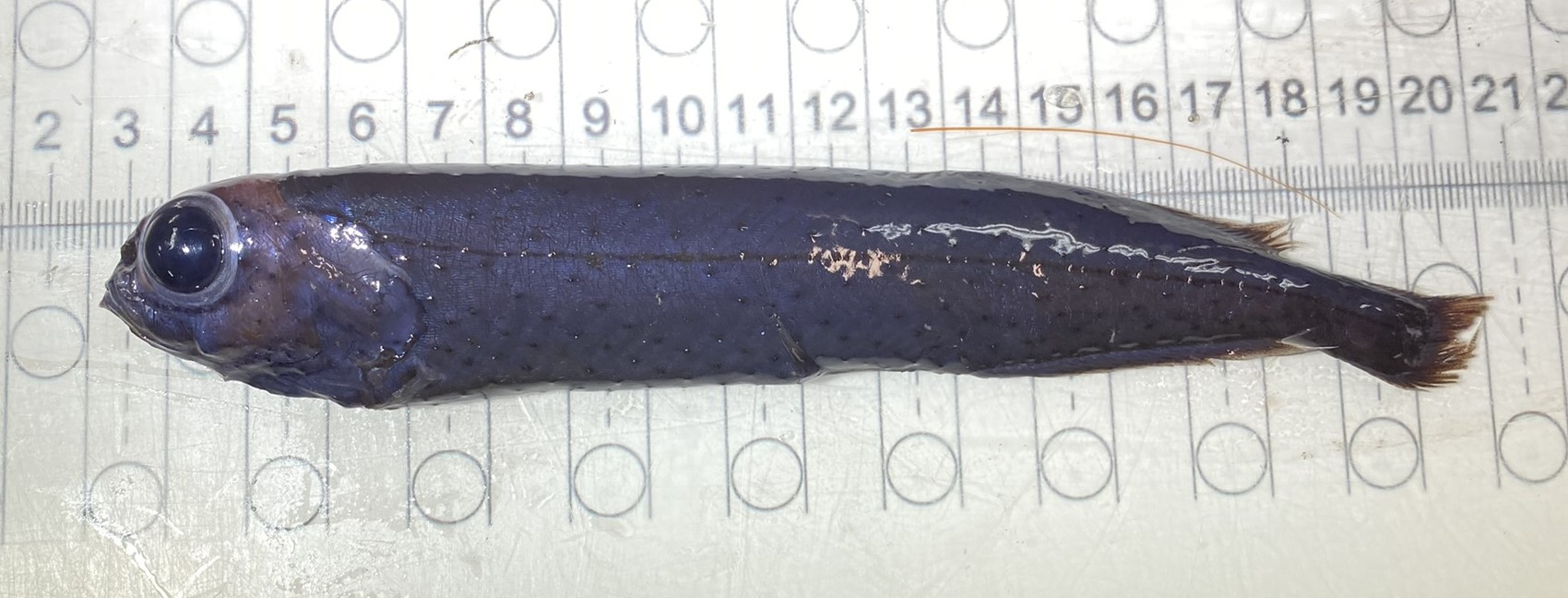

Conservation status
- Least Concern (IUCN 3.1)

Scientific classification
- Kingdom: Animalia
- Phylum: Chordata
- Class: Actinopterygii
- Order: Alepocephaliformes
- Family: Alepocephalidae
- Genus: Xenodermichthys
- Species: X. copei

Binomial name
- Xenodermichthys copei (T. N. Gill, 1884)

= Bluntsnout smooth-head =

Species of fish

The bluntsnout smooth-head, black slickhead, Cope's bluntsnout smooth-head, or Atlantic gymnast, Xenodermichthys copei, is a slickhead of the genus Xenodermichthys, found in the Atlantic, Indian, and Pacific oceans, and the Tasman Sea, at depths of 100 to 2,600 m (330 to 8,530 ft). This species grows to a length of 31 centimetres (12 in) TL.

== Description ==
Xenodermichthys copei is a dark-coloured fish that is scaleless, aside from a series of ~60 small, easily missed ring-shaped scales along the lateral line. It possess 27–30 dorsal fin rays, 28–29 anal fin rays, 7 pectoral fin rays, 6 pelvic fin rays, and 55 caudal rays. It has 48–49 vertebrae.

The skin is studded with numerous nodular photophores (>500) which are more visible in preserved specimens where skin pigmentation has degraded over time. The skin of Xenodermichthys possess an unusual system of compartmented sub-dermal spaces filled with a dilute fluid (possibly lymph), thought to serve as a buoyancy aid, alongside scale loss and poor skeleton calcification. This species lacks a swim bladder.

The photophores of Xenodermichthys have a distinctive reddish-violet hue in fresh specimens under white light, and are underlain with a greenish-blue reflector that lacks guanine. While the greater size of the ventral photophores may indicate their use in counterillumination, the arrangement and structure of the photophores, as well as difficulties in observing bioluminescence in live individuals, means that the purpose of these photophores is poorly understood. The eyes, which are large and well developed, contain visual pigments indicative of maximum sensitivity in deep blue light (~480nm), as is common in mesopelagic fishes.

== Trophic Ecology ==
Xenodermichthys copei is a predator that feeds on pelagic organisms, with a diet primarily composed of planktonic and micronektonic crustaceans, including natant decapod prawns, calanoid copepods, and both gammarid and hyperiid amphipods. X. copei also feeds on gelatinous zooplankton, including salps. However, on the Chatham Rise in New Zealand salps are fed upon by two other species of slickhead (Alepocephalus antipodianus and A. australis) and appear absent from the diet of X. copei; this appears to be an example of resource partitioning. Additionally, fragments of other fish, radiolarians and small cephalopods have been reported as parts of their diet. X. copei does not appear to forage on benthic organisms, regardless of whether the individual is caught in a pelagic or demersal setting.

A number of organisms prey upon Xenodermichthys copei, including the roundnose grenadier, Coryphaenoides rupestris, itself a benthopelagic predator. It is a very minor part of the diet of the black scabbardfish Aphanopus carbo, which is a generalist mesopelagic predator, and is present in the diet of the cut-throat eel Synaphobranchus kaupi. While it is also fed upon by cetaceans, including the striped dolphin Stenella coeruleoalba, it appears to be actively disregarded by common dolphins (Delphinus delphis) in the Bay of Biscay, which instead target high-energy food sources like the lanternfish Notoscopelus kroyerii.

=== Parasites ===
Xenodermichthys copei is host to a number of endoparasites, including trematodes (Paraccacladium jamiesoni, Steringophorus blackeri, Dinosoma ventrovesiculare, and Helicometra sp.), and cestodes (Probothriocephalus alaini).
