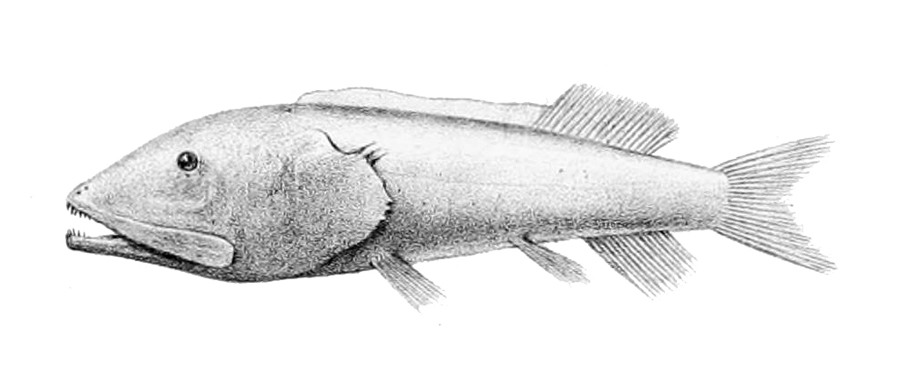

Conservation status
- Least Concern (IUCN 3.1)

Scientific classification
- Kingdom: Animalia
- Phylum: Chordata
- Class: Actinopterygii
- Order: Alepocephaliformes
- Family: Alepocephalidae
- Genus: Leptochilichthys
- Species: L. pinguis

Binomial name
- Leptochilichthys pinguis (Vaillant, 1886)

Synonyms
- Anomalopterus pinguis Vaillant, 1886; Anomalopterichthys pinguis (Vaillant, 1886)

= Vaillant's smooth-head =

Species of fish

Vaillant's smooth-head (Leptochilichthys pinguis) is a species of deepwater marine ray-finned fish belonging to the family Alepocephalidae, the smooth-heads. This species is found in the Atlantic Indian and Western Pacific Oceans.

== Taxonomy ==
Vaillant's smooth-head was first formally described as Anomalopterus pinguis in 1886 by the French zoologist Léon Vaillant with its type locality given as off "Cape Blanc" off Morocco at a depth of 1,400 m (4,600 ft). This species is currently classified in the genus Leptochilichthys within the family Alepocephalidae in the order Alepocephaliformes.

== Etymology ==
Vaillan's smooth-head is in the genus Leptochilichthys, a name which is a combination of leptos, which means "thin", cheilos, which means "lip", and ichthys, meaning "fish". The "thin lip" part is thought to refer to the slender maxilla and intermaxilla of the type species of the genus, L. agassizii. The specific name, pinguis, means "fat", a reference to fold or cushion of adipose tissue that runs along the back in front of the dorsal fin.

== Description ==
Vaillant's smooth-head has an elongated and streamlined body with a smooth head which has no obvious ridges on it. The large eyes are positioned high on the head. The pelvic fins are large and located far forward on the body. The dorsal and anal fins are set well back on the body. The skin is smooth and the overall colour is dark brown to grey, paler ventrally. There is a fold of adipose tissue running along the back in front of the dorsal fin. The dorsal fin contains between 16 and 21 soft rays while the anal fin contains 14 and 18 soft rays. This species has a maximum published standard length of 23.5 cm (9.3 in).

== Distribution and habitat ==
Vaillant's smooth-head is found in the Eastern Atlantic Ocean, the Indian Ocean and the Western Pacific Ocean. In the Eastern Atlantic it occurs from Morocco south to South Africa, in the Indian Ocean it occurs on the Mascarene Ridge and in the northern part of the Ocean between Somalia and Indonesia into the Western Pacific Ocean, in the Arafura and Sulu Seas. It is a bathypelagic species found at depths between 800 and 1,400 m (2,600 and 4,600 ft).
