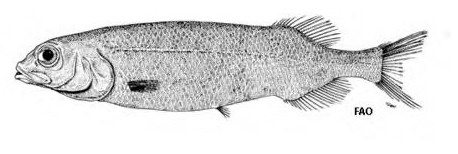
- Bajacalifornia megalops

Scientific classification
- Kingdom: Animalia
- Phylum: Chordata
- Class: Actinopterygii
- Order: Alepocephaliformes
- Family: Alepocephalidae
- Genus: Bajacalifornia; C. H. Townsend & Nichols, 1925

Type species
- Bajacalifornia burragei C. H. Townsend & Nichols, 1925

Species
- 7, see text

= Bajacalifornia =

Genus of fishes

Bajacalifornia is a genus of slickheads. It was described in 1925 by Charles Haskins Townsend and John Treadwell Nichols on the basis of Bajacalifornia burragei which was discovered in 1911 during the deep sea expedition of the research vessel USS Albatross off the coast of Todos Santos Bay at the Baja California peninsula. In 1952 Ichthyologist Albert Eide Parr published a revision of this genus.

== Species ==
There are currently six recognized species in this genus:

- Bajacalifornia aequatoris Miya & Markle, 1993
- Bajacalifornia arcylepis Markle & G. Krefft, 1985 (Network slickhead)
- Bajacalifornia burragei C. H. Townsend & Nichols, 1925 (Sharpchin slickhead)
- Bajacalifornia calcarata (M. C. W. Weber, 1913) (Brown slickhead)
- Bajacalifornia megalops (Lütken, 1898) (Bigeye smooth-head)
- Bajacalifornia microstoma Sazonov, 1988

== Description ==
The body is covered with small cycloid scales. The ventral scales are well developed. The mouth is moderately wide but larger than in the genus Alepocephalus. The lower jaw is strongly projected and ends in a pointed knob which is directed obliquely forwards. The jaw edges have a single row of small teeth. The gill raker openings are wide, the gill membranes are joined below. The short dorsal and anal fins are equal in length.

== Distribution ==
The distribution area ranges from the Indian Ocean, the Indo-Pacific north to the Sea of Japan and eastwards to the East Pacific Rise.
