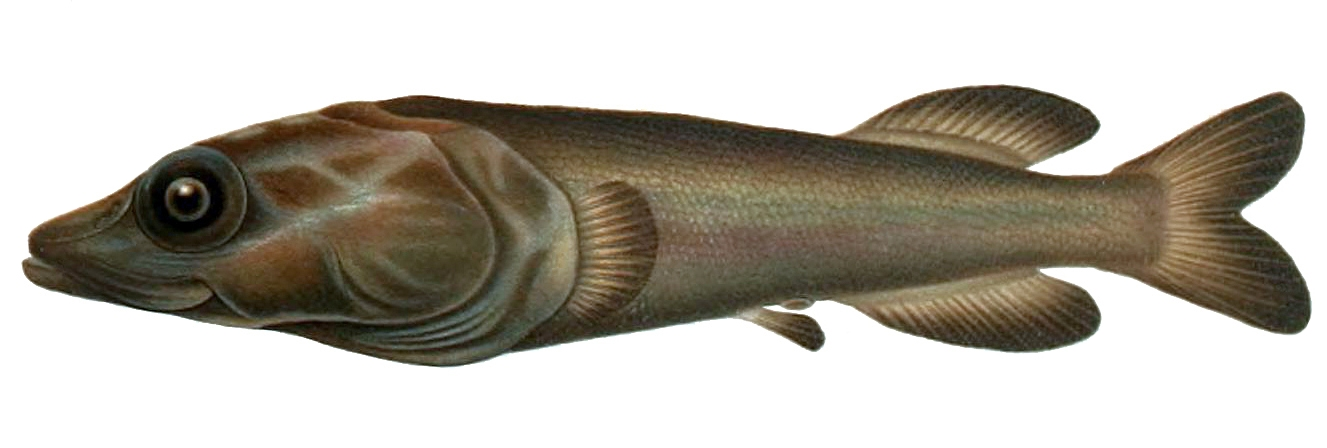
- Asquamiceps velaris

Scientific classification
- Kingdom: Animalia
- Phylum: Chordata
- Class: Actinopterygii
- Order: Alepocephaliformes
- Family: Alepocephalidae
- Genus: Asquamiceps; Zugmayer, 1911

Type species
- Asquamiceps velaris Zugmayer, 1911

Synonyms
- Megalepocephalus Fowler, 1934; Perioceps Parr, 1954

= Asquamiceps =

Genus of fishes

Asquamiceps is a genus of slickheads that occurs in all oceans. It is one of nineteen genera in the family Alepocephalidae.

== Species ==
There are currently five recognized species in this genus:

- Asquamiceps caeruleus Markle, 1980
- Asquamiceps hjorti (Koefoed, 1927) (Barethroat slickhead)
- Asquamiceps longmani Fowler, 1934
- Asquamiceps pacifcicus Parr, 1954
- Asquamiceps velaris Zugmayer, 1911 (Fanfin smooth-head)
