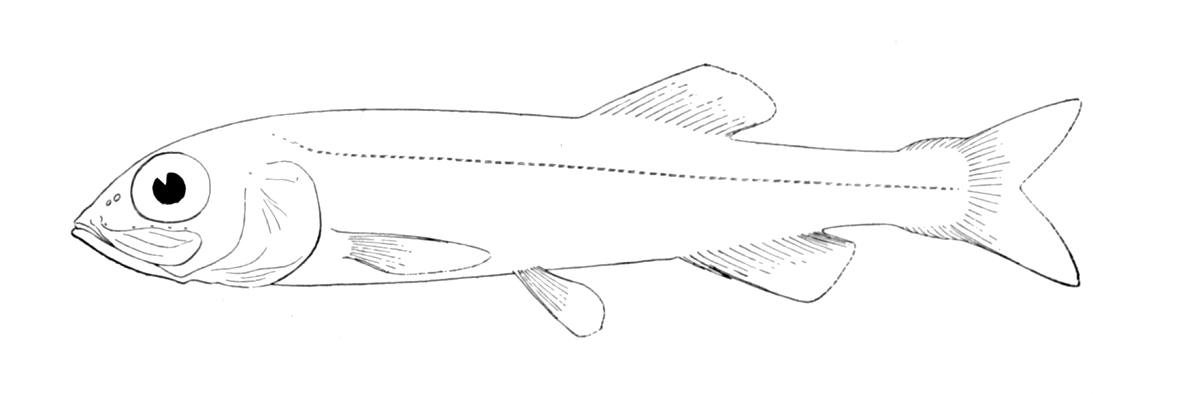
- Koefoed's smooth-head (Bathytroctes macrolepis)

Scientific classification
- Kingdom: Animalia
- Phylum: Chordata
- Class: Actinopterygii
- Division: Teleostei
- Order: Alepocephaliformes
- Family: Alepocephalidae
- Genus: Bathytroctes; Günther, 1878

Type species
- Bathytroctes microlepis Günther, 1878

Synonyms
- Grimatroctes Parr, 1952; Lepogenys Parr, 1951; Nomoctes Parr, 1952

= Bathytroctes =

Genus of fishes

Bathytroctes is a genus of deepwater marine ray-finned fishes belonging to the family Alepocephalidae, the smooth-heads. These fishes are found in the deeper waters of oceans around the world.

== Species ==
There are currently 11 recognized species in this genus:

- Bathytroctes breviceps Sazonov, 1999
- Bathytroctes elegans Sazonov & A. N. Ivanov, 1979
- Bathytroctes inspector Garman, 1899
- Bathytroctes macrognathus Sazonov, 1999
- Bathytroctes macrolepis Günther, 1887 (Koefoed's smooth-head)
- Bathytroctes michaelsarsi Koefoed, 1927 (Michael Sars' smooth-head)
- Bathytroctes microlepis Günther, 1878 (Smallscale smooth-head)
- Bathytroctes oligolepis (G. Krefft, 1970)
- Bathytroctes pappenheimi (Fowler, 1934)
- Bathytroctes squamosus Alcock, 1890 (Deepscale slickhead)
- Bathytroctes zugmayeri Fowler, 1934 (Zugmayer's slickhead)
