= Rinoctes =

Conservation status
- Least Concern (IUCN 3.1)

Scientific classification
- Kingdom: Animalia
- Phylum: Chordata
- Class: Actinopterygii
- Order: Alepocephaliformes
- Family: Alepocephalidae
- Genus: Rinoctes; A. E. Parr, 1952
- Species: R. nasutus

Binomial name
- Rinoctes nasutus (Koefoed, 1927)

Synonyms
- Bathytroctes nasutus Koefoed, 1927

Species of fish

Rinoctes is a monospecific genus of deepwater maine ray-finned fish belonging to the family Alepocephalidae, the slickheads. The only species in the genus is Rinoctes nasutus, the abyssal smooth-head, which is found at depths of 2,000 metres (6,600 ft) to 4,156 metres (13,635 ft) in the Atlantic Ocean, and possibly in the Indian and Pacific Oceans. It grows to a length of 19 centimetres (7.5 in) SL.
