= Narcetes erimelas =

Scientific classification
- Domain: Eukaryota
- Kingdom: Animalia
- Phylum: Chordata
- Class: Actinopterygii
- Order: Alepocephaliformes
- Family: Alepocephalidae
- Genus: Narcetes
- Species: N. erimelas

Binomial name
- Narcetes erimelas (Alcock, 1890)

Species of fish

Narcetes erimelas is a species of fish in the family Alepocephalidae (slickheads). The fish is found worldwide. This species reaches a length of 29.1 cm (11.5 in).
