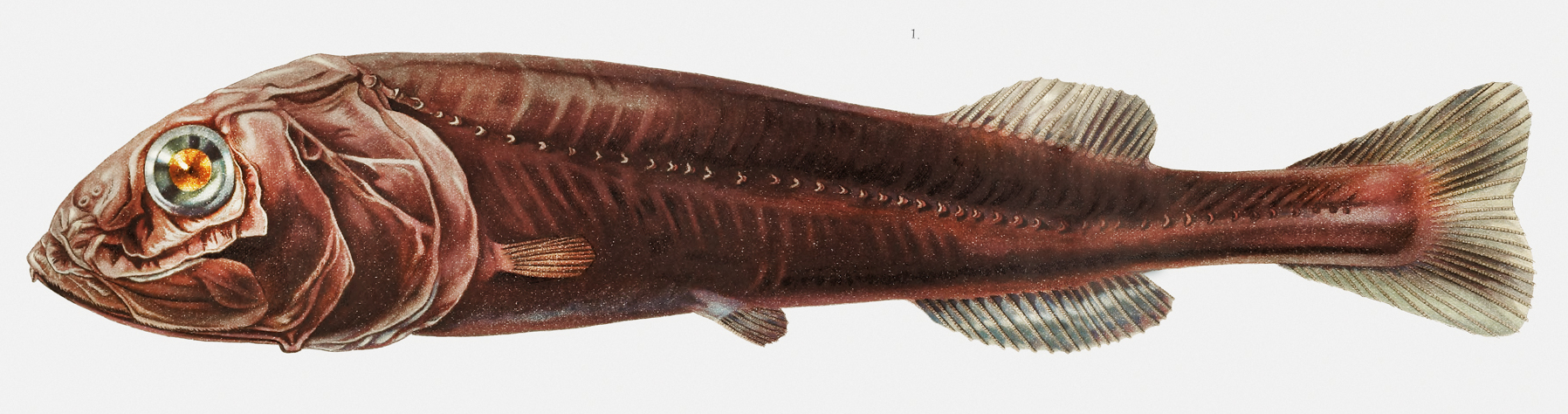

Conservation status
- Least Concern (IUCN 3.1)

Scientific classification
- Kingdom: Animalia
- Phylum: Chordata
- Class: Actinopterygii
- Order: Alepocephaliformes
- Family: Alepocephalidae
- Genus: Rouleina
- Species: R. attrita

Binomial name
- Rouleina attrita (Vaillant, 1888)

Synonyms
- Bathytroctes aequatoris Goode & Bean, 1896; Bathytroctes attritus Vaillant, 1888; Bathytroctes mollis Köhler, 1896; Caudania mollis Köhler, 1896; Rouleina attritus Vaillant, 1888; Rouleina mollis Köhler, 1896; Talismania mollis Köhler, 1896

= Rouleina attrita =

Species of fish

Rouleina attrita, the softskin smooth-head or softskin slickhead, is a species of fish in the family Alepocephalidae.

Its specific name is from the Latin attrīta ("bruised, worn away"), presumably referring to the mutilated or decomposed state of the type specimens.

== Description ==
Rouleina attrita is black, measuring up to 42 cm (17 in). Its upper jaw reaches to behind the eye, and it has a lateral line of 43–48 photophores. It has 43–46 vertebrae. Its scales are deciduous and its skin contains small fluid-filled compartments. Its eyes contain convexiclivate temporal foveae containing densely packed ganglia.

== Habitat ==
Rouleina attrita is engybenthic or bathypelagic, meaning that it swims near the seafloor, living at depths of 450–2,300 m (1,480–7,550 ft). It has been recorded in all non-polar seas.

== Behaviour ==
Its testes are ribbon-like, in convoluted folds but never in discrete lobes. Its eggs are large, up to 3.2 mm (0.13 in) in diameter.
