= Leptoderma retropinna =

Scientific classification
- Domain: Eukaryota
- Kingdom: Animalia
- Phylum: Chordata
- Class: Actinopterygii
- Order: Alepocephaliformes
- Family: Alepocephalidae
- Genus: Leptoderma
- Species: L. retropinna

Binomial name
- Leptoderma retropinna Fowler, 1943

Species of fish

Leptoderma retropinna is a species of slickhead found in the Indian Ocean.

== Description ==
This species reaches a length of 21.0 cm (8.3 in).
