= Narcetes lloydi =

Scientific classification
- Kingdom: Animalia
- Phylum: Chordata
- Class: Actinopterygii
- Order: Alepocephaliformes
- Family: Alepocephalidae
- Genus: Narcetes
- Species: N. lloydi

Binomial name
- Narcetes lloydi Fowler, 1934

Species of fish

Lloyd's slickhead (Narcetes lloydi) is a species of fish in the family Alepocephalidae (slickheads). The fish is found in the Indo-West Pacific: on Indian Ocean ridges, in the Arabian Sea and the South China Sea. This species reaches a length of 50 cm (20 in).

== Etymology ==
The fish is named in honor of surgeon-naturalist Richard E. Lloyd (born 1875), of the Marine Survey of India and a student of the deep-sea fishes caught by the RV ‘Investigator,’ in 1909.
