= Leptoderma lubricum =

Scientific classification
- Domain: Eukaryota
- Kingdom: Animalia
- Phylum: Chordata
- Class: Actinopterygii
- Order: Alepocephaliformes
- Family: Alepocephalidae
- Genus: Leptoderma
- Species: L. lubricum

Binomial name
- Leptoderma lubricum T. Abe, Marumo & Kawaguchi, 1965

Species of fish

Leptoderma lubricum is a species of slickheads found in the western Pacific Ocean.

== Description ==
This species reaches a length of 21.0 cm (8.3 in).
