= Leptoderma macrophthalmum =

Conservation status
- Data Deficient (IUCN 3.1)

Scientific classification
- Kingdom: Animalia
- Phylum: Chordata
- Class: Actinopterygii
- Order: Alepocephaliformes
- Family: Alepocephalidae
- Genus: Leptoderma
- Species: L. macrophthalmum

Binomial name
- Leptoderma macrophthalmum Byrkjedal, J. Y. Poulsen & J. K. Galbraith, 2011

Species of fish

Leptoderma macrophthalmum is a species of slickhead found in the Atlantic Ocean.

== Description ==
This species reaches a length of 15.1 cm (5.9 in).
