= Rouleina maderensis =

Conservation status
- Least Concern (IUCN 3.1)

Scientific classification
- Kingdom: Animalia
- Phylum: Chordata
- Class: Actinopterygii
- Order: Alepocephaliformes
- Family: Alepocephalidae
- Genus: Rouleina
- Species: R. maderensis

Binomial name
- Rouleina maderensis Maul, 1948

Species of fish

Rouleina maderensis, the Madeiran smooth-head, is a species of fish in the family Alepocephalidae.

It is found worldwide. This species reaches a length of 32 cm (13 in).
