= Narcetes stomias =

Conservation status
- Least Concern (IUCN 3.1)

Scientific classification
- Domain: Eukaryota
- Kingdom: Animalia
- Phylum: Chordata
- Class: Actinopterygii
- Order: Alepocephaliformes
- Family: Alepocephalidae
- Genus: Narcetes
- Species: N. stomias

Binomial name
- Narcetes stomias (Gilbert, 1890)

Synonyms
- Bathytroctes stomias (Gilbert, 1890); Narcetes affinis (Lloyd, 1906); Narcetes pluriserialis (Garman, 1899)

Species of fish

Narcetes stomias, the blackhead salmon, is a species of fish in the family Alepocephalidae (slickheads).

== Classification ==
Despite the common name, it is not a true salmon, which are in the genus Salmo and are in the distant Salmoniformes order. Its specific name is from Greek στομίας (stomias, "hard-mouthed").

== Description ==
Narcetes stomias is blackish in colour. Its maximum length is 57.5 centimetres (1.89 ft).

== Habitat ==
Narcetes stomias lives in the Atlantic Ocean, Indian Ocean and Pacific Ocean; it is bathypelagic or benthopelagic, living at depths of 1,500–2,300 m (4,900–7,500 ft).

== Reproduction ==
Narcetes stomias lays eggs of up to 4 mm (0.16 in) in diameter.

The trematode worm Olssonium turneri (family Fellodistomidae) is a parasite upon it.
