= Leptoderma ospesca =

Scientific classification
- Domain: Eukaryota
- Kingdom: Animalia
- Phylum: Chordata
- Class: Actinopterygii
- Order: Alepocephaliformes
- Family: Alepocephalidae
- Genus: Leptoderma
- Species: L. ospesca

Binomial name
- Leptoderma ospesca Angulo, C. C. Baldwin & D. R. Robertson

Species of fish

Leptoderma ospesca, the eastern eel-slickhead, is a species of slickhead found in the eastern-central Pacific Ocean.

== Description ==
This species reaches a length of 19.7 cm (7.8 in).
