= Mirognathus =

Conservation status
- Data Deficient (IUCN 3.1)

Scientific classification
- Kingdom: Animalia
- Phylum: Chordata
- Class: Actinopterygii
- Order: Alepocephaliformes
- Family: Alepocephalidae
- Genus: Mirognathus; A. E. Parr, 1951
- Species: M. normani

Binomial name
- Mirognathus normani A. E. Parr, 1951

Species of fish

Mirognathus is a monospecific genus of deepwater maine ray-finned fish belonging to the family Alepocephalidae, the slickheads. The only species in the genus is Mirognathus normani, the beaked slickhead or Norman's smooth-head, which is found in the north-east and western Atlantic Ocean, the western Indian Ocean and the western Pacific Ocean. This species grows to a standard length of 20 centimetres (7.9 in).
