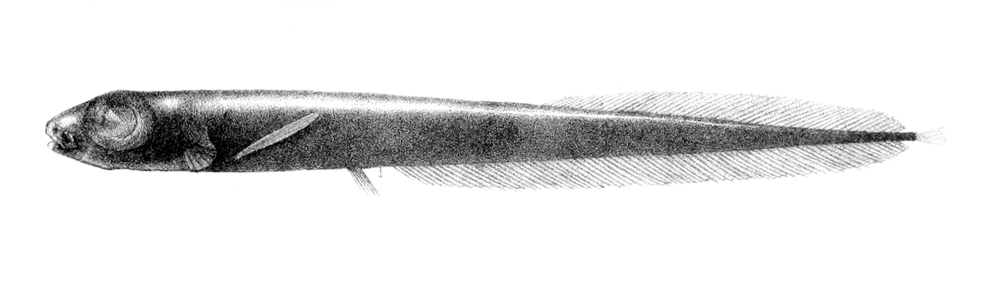

Conservation status
- Least Concern (IUCN 3.1)

Scientific classification
- Kingdom: Animalia
- Phylum: Chordata
- Class: Actinopterygii
- Order: Alepocephaliformes
- Family: Alepocephalidae
- Genus: Leptoderma
- Species: L. macrops

Binomial name
- Leptoderma macrops Vaillant, 1886

= Leptoderma macrops =

Species of fish

Leptoderma macrops, the grenadier smooth-head, is a species of slickhead found in the eastern Atlantic Ocean.

== Description ==
This species reaches a length of 24.0 cm (9.4 in).
