= Bathytroctes elegans =

Scientific classification
- Domain: Eukaryota
- Kingdom: Animalia
- Phylum: Chordata
- Class: Actinopterygii
- Order: Alepocephaliformes
- Family: Alepocephalidae
- Genus: Bathytroctes
- Species: B. elegans

Binomial name
- Bathytroctes elegans Sazonov & A. N. Ivanov, 1979

Species of fish

Bathytroctes elegans is a species of slickheads (Alepocephalidae). It is found in the Western Indian Ocean.
