= Einara =

Scientific classification
- Kingdom: Animalia
- Phylum: Chordata
- Class: Actinopterygii
- Order: Alepocephaliformes
- Family: Alepocephalidae
- Genus: Einara; Parr, 1951

Type species
- Alepocephalus macrolepis Koefoed, 1927

Synonyms
- Torictus Parr, 1952

Genus of fishes

Einara is a small genus of slickheads found in the deep waters of the oceans. They can grow to 22 cm (8.7 in) standard length

The etymology of the genus name is uncertain but could refer Norwegian marine biologist Einar Koefoed.

== Species ==
There are currently two recognized species in this genus:

- Einara edentula (Alcock, 1892) (toothless smooth-head)
- Einara macrolepis (Koefoed, 1927) (loosescale smooth-head)
