= Talismania kotlyari =

Scientific classification
- Kingdom: Animalia
- Phylum: Chordata
- Class: Actinopterygii
- Order: Alepocephaliformes
- Family: Alepocephalidae
- Genus: Talismania
- Species: T. kotlyari

Binomial name
- Talismania kotlyari Sazonov & Ivanov, 1980

Species of fish

Talismania kotyari is a species of deepwater marine ray-finned fish belonging to the family Alepocephalidae, the smooth-heads. This species occurs in the northeastern Indian Ocean.
