= Narcetes wonderi =

Scientific classification
- Kingdom: Animalia
- Phylum: Chordata
- Class: Actinopterygii
- Order: Alepocephaliformes
- Family: Alepocephalidae
- Genus: Narcetes
- Species: N. wonderi

Binomial name
- Narcetes wonderi Herre, 1935

Species of fish

Narcetes wonderi is a species of fish in the family Alepocephalidae (slickheads). It is found in the waters of Japan.

== Etymology ==
The fish is named in honor of taxidermist Frank C. Wonder (1904-1963) of the Field Museum of Natural History in Chicago.
