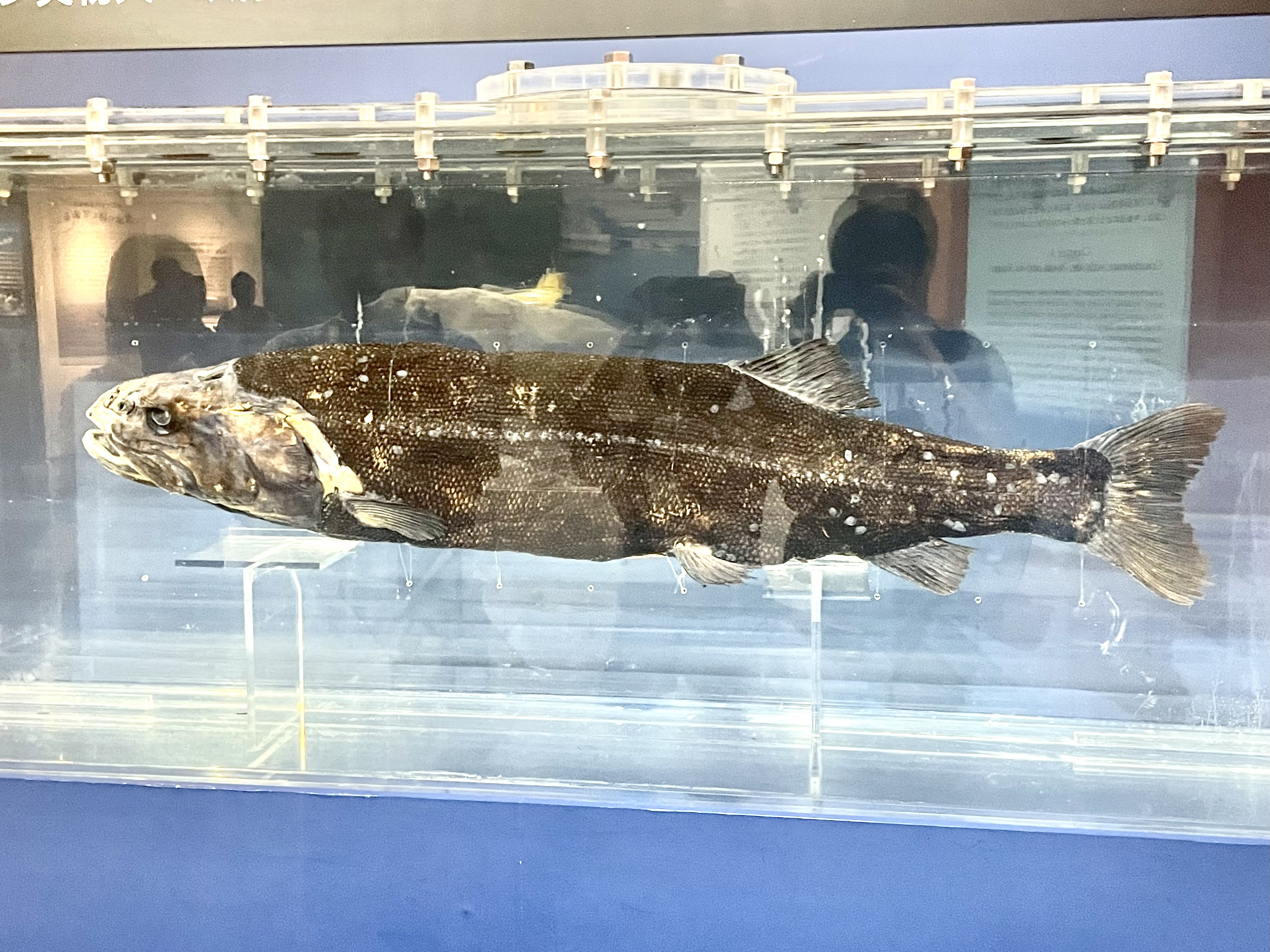
- Narcetes shonanmaruae

Scientific classification
- Kingdom: Animalia
- Phylum: Chordata
- Class: Actinopterygii
- Order: Alepocephaliformes
- Family: Alepocephalidae
- Genus: Narcetes; Alcock, 1890

Type species
- Narcetes erimelas Alcock, 1890

Species
- 6, see text.

Synonyms
- Alcockella Fowler, 1934; Bellocia Parr, 1951

= Narcetes =

Genus of fishes

Narcetes is a genus of slickheads. It was formally described by Alfred William Alcock in 1890. It currently contains six described species.

The generic name is from Greek νάρκη (narkē, "electric ray" or "numbness") and -της (tēs, forming a masculine noun meaning, from a place).

== Species ==
There are currently six recognized species in this genus:

- Narcetes erimelas Alcock, 1890
- Narcetes kamoharai Okamura, 1984
- Narcetes lloydi Fowler, 1934 (Lloyd's slickhead)
- Narcetes shonanmaruae Poulsen, H. Ida, Kawato & Fujiwara, 2021 (Yokozuna slickhead)
- Narcetes stomias (C. H. Gilbert, 1890) (Blackhead salmon)
- Narcetes wonderi Herre, 1935
