= Carpathichthys =

Carpathichthys Temporal range: Early Oligocene

Scientific classification
- Kingdom: Animalia
- Phylum: Chordata
- Class: Actinopterygii
- Order: Alepocephaliformes
- Family: Alepocephalidae
- Genus: †Carpathichthys; Jerzmanska, 1979
- Species: †C. polonicus

Binomial name
- †Carpathichthys polonicus Jerzmanska, 1979

Extinct genus of fishes

Carpathichthys ("Carpathian fish") is an extinct genus of prehistoric slickhead fish from the Oligocene. It contains a single species, C. polonicus, from the Menilite Formation in the Carpathian Flysch Belt of Poland, in what was formerly the Paratethys Sea.

It is one of the very few known fossil slickheads, a group of ray-finned fishes that are assumed to have ancient origins, but have almost no presence in the geological record, likely due to their preference for deep-water habitats. The only other known fossil slickhead is an indeterminate member of Bathyprion from the same formation, indicating that it was likely deposited in an abyssal habitat. Carpathichthys appears to be closely related to the extant genus Rouleina.

== See also ==
- Prehistoric fish
- List of prehistoric bony fish
