= Narcetes kamoharai =

Scientific classification
- Kingdom: Animalia
- Phylum: Chordata
- Class: Actinopterygii
- Order: Alepocephaliformes
- Family: Alepocephalidae
- Genus: Narcetes
- Species: N. kamoharai

Binomial name
- Narcetes kamoharai Okamura, 1984

Species of fish

Narcetes kamoharai is a species of fish in the family Alepocephalidae (slickheads). The fish is found in the Western Pacific with Japan and the Philippines in its range. This species reaches a length of 34 cm (13 in).

== Etymology ==
The fish is named in honor of Toshiji Kamohara (1901–1972), an ichthyologist at Kochi University.
