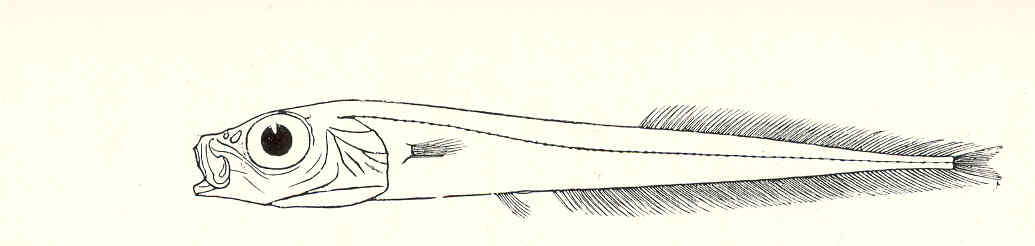

Scientific classification
- Domain: Eukaryota
- Kingdom: Animalia
- Phylum: Chordata
- Class: Actinopterygii
- Order: Alepocephaliformes
- Family: Alepocephalidae
- Genus: Leptoderma
- Species: L. affinis

Binomial name
- Leptoderma affinis Alcock, 1899

= Leptoderma affinis =

Species of fish

Leptoderma affinis, the eel slickhead, is a species of slickheads found in the Indian Ocean.

== Description ==
This species reaches a length of 22.3 cm (8.8 in).
