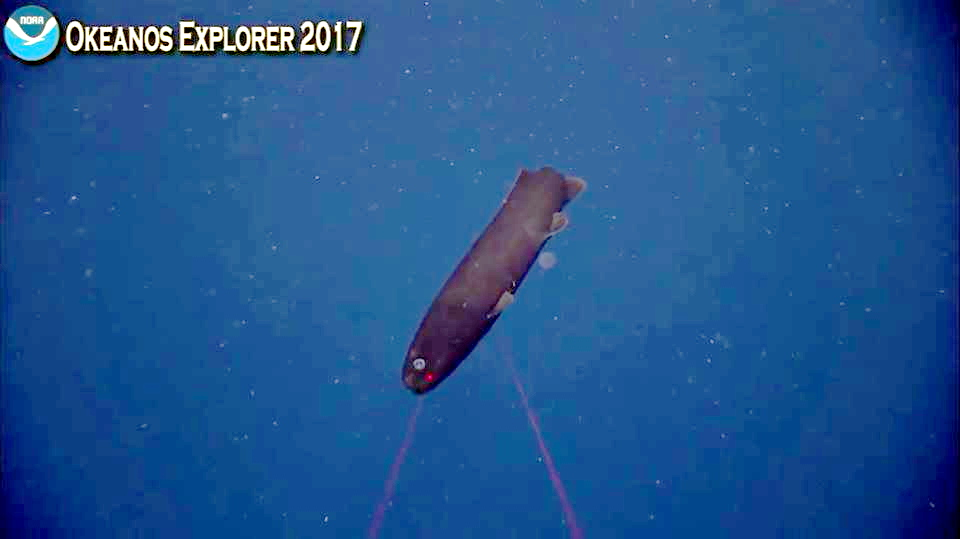
- A Leptochilichthys seen in the abyss of the Gulf of Mexico

Scientific classification
- Kingdom: Animalia
- Phylum: Chordata
- Class: Actinopterygii
- Order: Alepocephaliformes
- Family: Alepocephalidae
- Genus: Leptochilichthys; Garman, 1899

Type species
- Leptochilichthys agassizii Garman, 1899

Synonyms
- Anomalopterichthys Whitley, 1940; Anomalopterus Vaillant, 1886

= Leptochilichthys =

Genus of fishes

Leptochilichthys is a genus of fishes containing four species. Leptochilichthys is the only genus in the former family Leptochilichthyidae but is now included within the broader family Alepocephalidae.

Its name derives from the Greek λεπτός (leptos, "small"); χεῖλος (cheilos, "lip"); and ἰχθύς (ichthys, "fish").

== Species ==
The currently recognized species in this genus are:

- Leptochilichthys agassizii (Garman, 1899) (Agassiz' smooth-head)
- Leptochilichthys microlepis (Machida & Shiogaki, 1988) (smallscale smooth-head)
- Leptochilichthys pinguis (Vaillant, 1886) (Vaillant's smooth-head)

== Description ==
Species in genus Leptochilichthys have toothless maxillae. The maxillae are considered especially long There are teeth on the palate and dentary. Many long gill rakers are also present. This genus does not exhibit any shoulder sac apparatus. Thirteen branchiostegal rays support the gill membranes behind the lower jaw. There may be 11 to 21 dorsal fin rays, and 11–18 anal fin rays. These species have 47–64 lateral line scales. Species of this genus have between 47 and 58 vertebrae. They can reach up to 31 cm (12 in) in length.

== Distribution and habitat ==
Leptochilichthys species are found in deep sea regions in the eastern Atlantic, western Indian, and eastern and western Pacific Oceans. They are most commonly found at depths of 1,000 metres (3,300 ft) and below, but are in general not well known.

Some species in this genus, particularly L. agassizii, may be bathypelagic.
