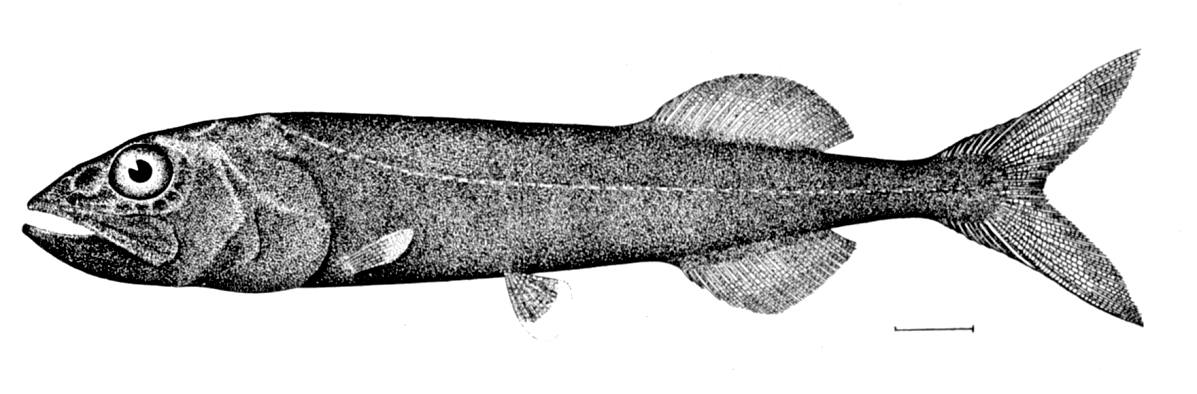
- Softskin smooth-head (Rouleina attrita)

Scientific classification
- Kingdom: Animalia
- Phylum: Chordata
- Class: Actinopterygii
- Order: Alepocephaliformes
- Family: Alepocephalidae
- Genus: Rouleina; Jordan, 1923

Type species
- Xenodermichthys guentheri Alcock, 1892

Synonyms
- Aleposomus Roule, 1915; Auchenalepoceps Fowler, 1943; Bathypropteron Fowler, 1934; Caudania Roule, 1935; Jordanites Fowler, 1925

= Rouleina =

Genus of fishes

Rouleina is a genus of slickheads. The genus is named for the ichthyologist Louis Roule.

== Species ==
There are currently 10 recognized species in this genus:

- Rouleina attrita (Vaillant, 1888) (Softskin smooth-head)
- Rouleina danae A. E. Parr, 1951
- Rouleina eucla Whitley, 1940 (Eucla slickhead)
- Rouleina euryops Sazonov, 1999
- Rouleina guentheri (Alcock, 1892) (Bordello slickhead)
- Rouleina livida (A. B. Brauer, 1906)
- Rouleina maderensis Maul, 1948 (Madeiran smooth-head)
- Rouleina nuda (A. B. Brauer, 1906)
- Rouleina squamilatera (Alcock, 1898) (Bluntsnout slickhead)
- Rouleina watasei (S. Tanaka (I), 1909)
