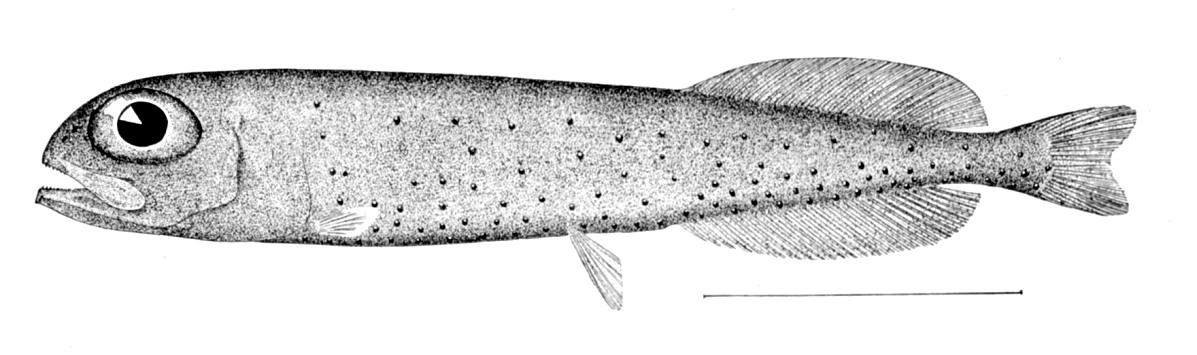
- Bluntsnout Smooth-head (Xenodermichthys copei)

Scientific classification
- Domain: Eukaryota
- Kingdom: Animalia
- Phylum: Chordata
- Class: Actinopterygii
- Order: Alepocephaliformes
- Family: Alepocephalidae
- Genus: Xenodermichthys; Günther, 1878

Type species
- Xenodermichthys nodulosus Günther, 1878

Synonyms
- Aleposomus Gill, 1884

= Xenodermichthys =

Genus of fishes

Xenodermichthys is a small genus of slickheads.

== Species ==
There are currently two recognized species in this genus:

- Xenodermichthys copei (T. N. Gill, 1884) (Bluntsnout smooth-head)
- Xenodermichthys nodulosus Günther, 1878
