= Herwigia =

Conservation status
- Least Concern (IUCN 3.1)

Scientific classification
- Kingdom: Animalia
- Phylum: Chordata
- Class: Actinopterygii
- Order: Alepocephaliformes
- Family: Alepocephalidae
- Genus: Herwigia; J. G. Nielsen, 1972
- Species: H. kreffti

Binomial name
- Herwigia kreffti (J. G. Nielsen & Larsen, 1970)

Synonyms
- Bathylaco kreffti J. G. Nielsen & Larsen, 1970

Species of fish

Herwigia is a monospecific genus of deepwater maine ray-finned fish belonging to the family Alepocephalidae, the slickheads. The only species in the genus is Herwigia kreffti, or Krefft's smooth-head, a species found at depths of 1,000 to 3,200 metres (3,300 to 10,500 ft) in the oceans. This species grows to a length of 40 centimetres (16 in) SL.
