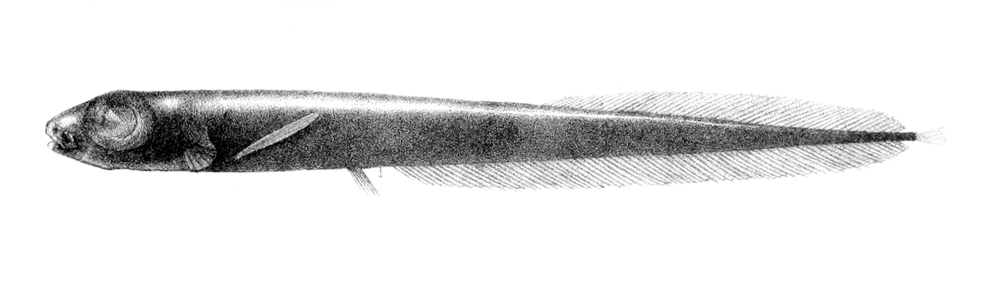
- Leptoderma macrops

Scientific classification
- Kingdom: Animalia
- Phylum: Chordata
- Class: Actinopterygii
- Order: Alepocephaliformes
- Family: Alepocephalidae
- Genus: Leptoderma; Vaillant, 1886

Type species
- Leptoderma macrops Vaillant, 1886

= Leptoderma =

Genus of fishes

Leptoderma is a genus of slickheads found in the deep waters of the oceans.

== Species ==
There are currently 6 recognized species in this genus:

- Leptoderma affinis Alcock, 1899 (eel slickhead)
- Leptoderma lubricum T. Abe, Marumo & Kawaguchi, 1965
- Leptoderma macrophthalmum Byrkjedal, J. Y. Poulsen & J. K. Galbraith, 2011
- Leptoderma macrops Vaillant, 1886 (grenadier smooth-head)
- Leptoderma ospesca Angulo, C. C. Baldwin & D. R. Robertson, 2016 (eastern eel-slickhead)
- Leptoderma retropinna Fowler, 1943
