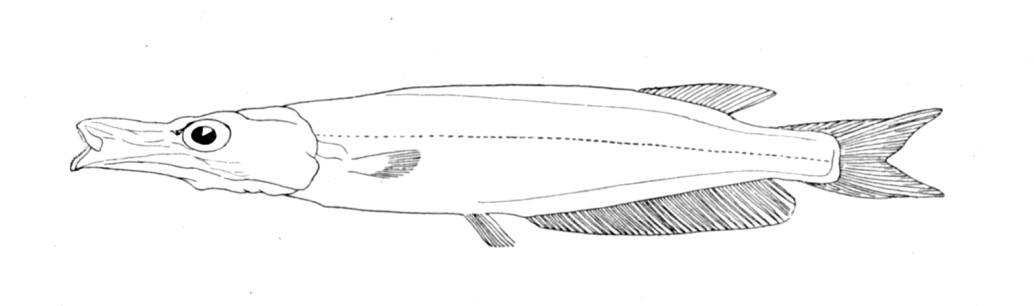

Scientific classification
- Kingdom: Animalia
- Phylum: Chordata
- Class: Actinopterygii
- Order: Alepocephaliformes
- Family: Alepocephalidae
- Genus: Aulastomatomorpha; Alcock, 1890
- Species: A. phospherops

Binomial name
- Aulastomatomorpha phospherops Alcock, 1890

= Aulastomatomorpha =

Genus of fishes

Aulastomatomorpha is a monospecific genus of deepwater maine ray-finned fish belonging to the family Alepocephalidae, the slickheads. The only species in the genus is Aulastomatomorpha phospherops, the luminous slickhead, which is found in the Indian and West Pacific Oceans. This species occurs on the continental slopes at depths of from 1,717 metres (5,633 ft) to 2,020 metres (6,630 ft). This species grows to a length of 28.0 centimetres (11.0 in) SL.
