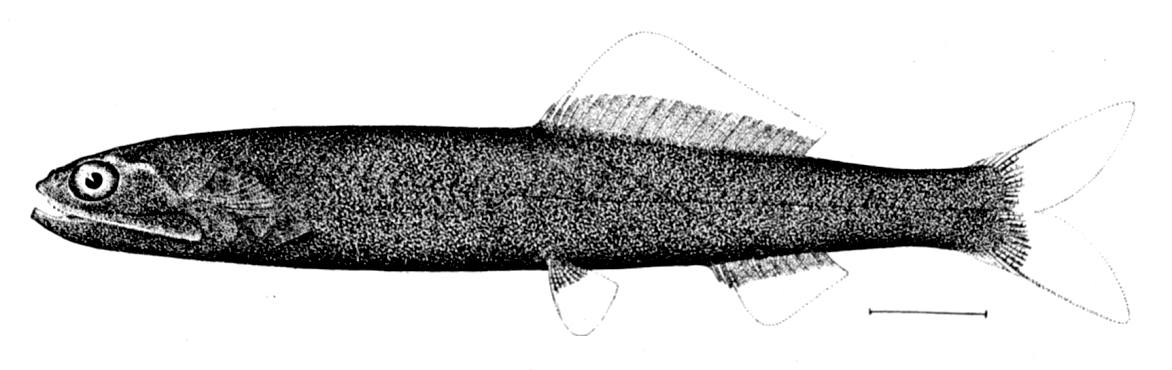
- Bathylaco nigricans

Scientific classification
- Kingdom: Animalia
- Phylum: Chordata
- Class: Actinopterygii
- Order: Alepocephaliformes
- Family: Alepocephalidae
- Genus: Bathylaco; Goode & T. H. Bean, 1896

Type species
- Bathylaco nigricans Goode & T. H. Bean, 1896

Synonyms
- Macromastax Beebe, 1933

= Bathylaco =

Genus of fishes

Bathylaco is a genus of slickheads found in deep oceanic waters. It is one of nineteen genera in the family Alepocephalidae.

== Species ==
There are currently three recognized species in this genus:

- Bathylaco macrophthalmus J. G. Nielsen & Larsen, 1968
- Bathylaco nielseni Sazonov & Ivanov, 1980
- Bathylaco nigricans Goode & T. H. Bean, 1896 (Black warrior)
