= Leptochilichthys agassizii =

Conservation status
- Least Concern (IUCN 3.1)

Scientific classification
- Domain: Eukaryota
- Kingdom: Animalia
- Phylum: Chordata
- Class: Actinopterygii
- Order: Alepocephaliformes
- Family: Alepocephalidae
- Genus: Leptochilichthys
- Species: L. agassizii

Binomial name
- Leptochilichthys agassizii (Garman, 1899)

Synonyms
- Leptochilichthys agassizi (Garman, 1899); Leptochilichthys agassizi macrops (Roule & Angel, 1931); Leptochilichthys macrops (Roule & Angel, 1933)

Species of fish

Leptochilichthys agassizii, or Agassiz' smooth-head, is a species of fish in the family Alepocephalidae. It is named for the scientist and engineer Alexander Agassiz (1835–1910), who commanded the 1899 survey aboard the USS Albatross on which the fish was discovered.

== Description ==
Leptochilichthys agassizii is brownish in colour, with a large head. Its maximum length is 30.8 centimetres (1.01 ft). It has large scales, with 47–52 in its lateral line.

== Habitat ==
Leptochilichthys agassizii lives in the Atlantic Ocean, Indian Ocean and Pacific Ocean; it is bathypelagic, living at depths of 2,000–3,100 m (6,600–10,200 ft).

== Reproduction ==
It lays large eggs, up to 8.5 mm (0.33 in) in diameter.
