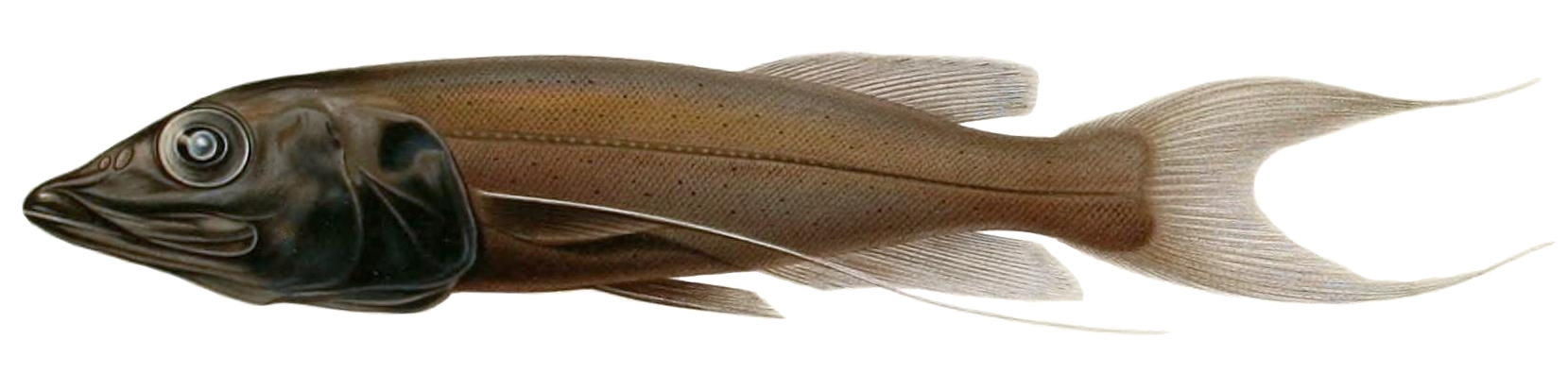
- Longtail slickhead (Talismania longifilis)

Scientific classification
- Kingdom: Animalia
- Phylum: Chordata
- Class: Actinopterygii
- Order: Alepocephaliformes
- Family: Alepocephalidae
- Genus: Talismania; Goode & T. H. Bean, 1896

Type species
- Bathytroctes homopterus Vaillant, 1888

Synonyms
- Binghamia Parr, 1937; Binghamichthys Whitley, 1941; Nemabathytroctes Fowler, 1934

= Talismania (fish) =

Genus of fishes

Talismania is a genus of slickheads.

== Species ==
There are currently 11 recognized species in this genus:

- Talismania antillarum (Goode & T. H. Bean, 1896) (Antillean smooth-head)
- Talismania aphos (W. A. Bussing, 1965)
- Talismania bifurcata (A. E. Parr, 1951) (Threadfin slickhead)
- Talismania brachycephala Sazonov, 1981
- Talismania bussingi Sazonov, 1989
- Talismania filamentosa Okamura & Kawanishi, 1984
- Talismania homoptera (Vaillant, 1888) (Hairfin smooth-head)
- Talismania kotlyari Sazonov & Ivanov, 1980
- Talismania longifilis (A. B. Brauer, 1902) (Longtail slickhead)
- Talismania mekistonema Sulak, 1975 (Threadfin smooth-head)
- Talismania okinawensis Okamura & Kawanishi, 1984
