= Bathyprion =

Bathyprion Temporal range: Late Oligocene–present

Conservation status
- Least Concern (IUCN 3.1)

Scientific classification
- Kingdom: Animalia
- Phylum: Chordata
- Class: Actinopterygii
- Order: Alepocephaliformes
- Family: Alepocephalidae
- Genus: Bathyprion; N. B. Marshall, 1966
- Species: B. danae

Binomial name
- Bathyprion danae N. B. Marshall, 1966

Genus of fish

Bathyprion, is a genus of deepwater marine ray-finned fish belonging to the family Alepocephalidae, the slickheads. Its only extant species is Bathyprion danae, the fangtooth smooth-head. This species is found in the Atlantic and western Pacific Oceans.

A fossil specimen of an undescribed Bathyprion species has been documented from the Oligocene of the Polish Carpathians. It is one of the very few fossil slickheads known alongside Carpathichthys.

== Taxonomy ==
Bathyprion was first proposed as a monospecific genus in 1966 by the British ichthyologist Norman Bertram Marshall when he described B. danae. B. danae had its type locality given as Australia at 33°26'S, 157°02'E, from a depth of 2,500 m (8,200 ft). This genus is classified in the family Alepocephalidae within the order Alepocephaliformes.

== Etymology ==
Bathyprion combines bathy, meaning "deep", with prion which means "saw", and allusion Marshall did not explain but it may refer to the long, sharp teeth on the upper jaw. The specific name, danae, is a reference to the Danish fishery research vessel Dana, the vessel the holotype was collected from in 1929.

== Environment ==
Bathyprion danae is recorded to be found in a marine environment within bathypelagic depth range of about 100 – 3200 meters. They are considered to be a species found in the deep-waters.

== Distribution ==
Bathyprion danae is native to the areas of the Eastern Atlantic, Namibia, the North Atlantic, and the western Pacific. It has been found isolated in the area of Madeira. This species has also been recorded to occupy the areas of the European waters, the North West Atlantic, the Portuguese Exclusive Economic Zone, and the Spanish Exclusive Economic Zone.

== Size ==
Bathyprion danae grows to a length of 38.0 centimetres (15.0 in) SL.

== Identification ==
Bathyprion danae can be identified by its slender body and its long, pointed snout. Its upper jaw is longer than its bottom jaw, and it reaches out longer than its eye. The scales of this species are colorful and there are numerous small scales on its body. Its body has a brownish color to it.

== Notes ==
- Froese, Rainer; Pauly, Daniel (eds.). "Bathyprion danae". FishBase. February 2012 version.
