= Peder Hansen =

Peder Hansen may refer to:

- Peder Hansen (bishop) (1746–1810), Danish bishop
- Peder Hansen (politician) (1859–?), Norwegian politician
