= Microphotolepis =

Scientific classification
- Kingdom: Animalia
- Phylum: Chordata
- Class: Actinopterygii
- Order: Alepocephaliformes
- Family: Alepocephalidae
- Genus: Microphotolepis; Sazonov & Parin, 1977

Type species
- Microphotolepis multipunctata Sazonov & Parin, 1977

Genus of fishes

Microphotolepis is a genus of slickheads found in the Pacific and Indian Oceans.

== Species ==
There are currently two recognized species in this genus:

- Microphotolepis multipunctata Sazonov & Parin, 1977
- Microphotolepis schmidti (Angel & Verrier, 1931)
