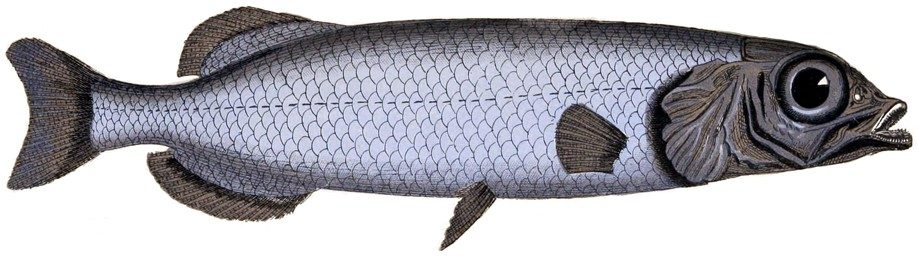

Conservation status
- Least Concern (IUCN 3.1)

Scientific classification
- Kingdom: Animalia
- Phylum: Chordata
- Class: Actinopterygii
- Order: Alepocephaliformes
- Family: Alepocephalidae
- Genus: Alepocephalus
- Species: A. rostratus

Binomial name
- Alepocephalus rostratus Risso, 1820

= Alepocephalus rostratus =

Species of fish

Alepocephalus rostratus, Risso's smooth-head, is a species of marine ray-finned fish belonging to the family Alepocephalidae, the slickheads. This is a deep water species found in the Eastern Atlantic Ocean.
