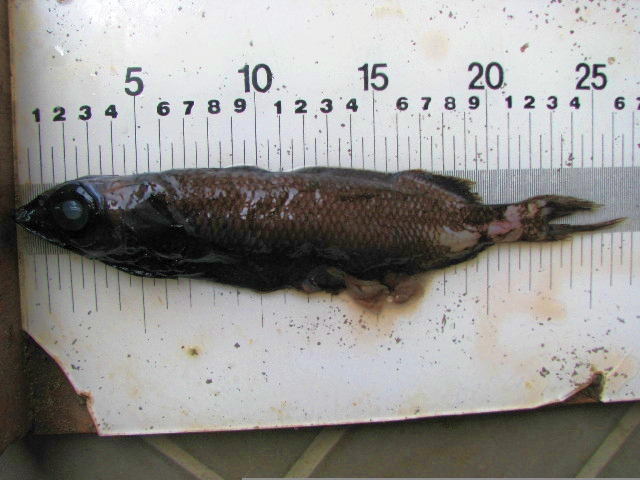

Conservation status
- Least Concern (IUCN 3.1)

Scientific classification
- Kingdom: Animalia
- Phylum: Chordata
- Class: Actinopterygii
- Order: Alepocephaliformes
- Family: Alepocephalidae
- Genus: Alepocephalus
- Species: A. australis

Binomial name
- Alepocephalus australis Barnard, 1923

= Alepocephalus australis =

Species of fish

Alepoocephalus australis, the small scaled brown slickhead, is a species of marine ray-finned fish belonging to the family Alepocephalidae, the slickheads. This is a deep water species found in the triopical and temperate waters around the world.
