= Talismania =

Talismania may refer to:

- Talismania (video game)
- Talismania (fish)
