= Photostylus =

Conservation status
- Least Concern (IUCN 3.1)

Scientific classification
- Kingdom: Animalia
- Phylum: Chordata
- Class: Actinopterygii
- Order: Alepocephaliformes
- Family: Alepocephalidae
- Genus: Photostylus; Beebe, 1933
- Species: P. pycnopterus

Binomial name
- Photostylus pycnopterus Beebe, 1933

Species of fish

Photostylus is a monospecific genus of deepwater maine ray-finned fish belonging to the family Alepocephalidae, the slickheads. The only species in the genus is Photostylus pycnopterus, the starry smooth-head, a species found in all oceans at depths of from 1,000 metres (3,300 ft) to 2,000 metres (6,600 ft). This species grows to a length of 11 centimetres (4.3 in) SL.
