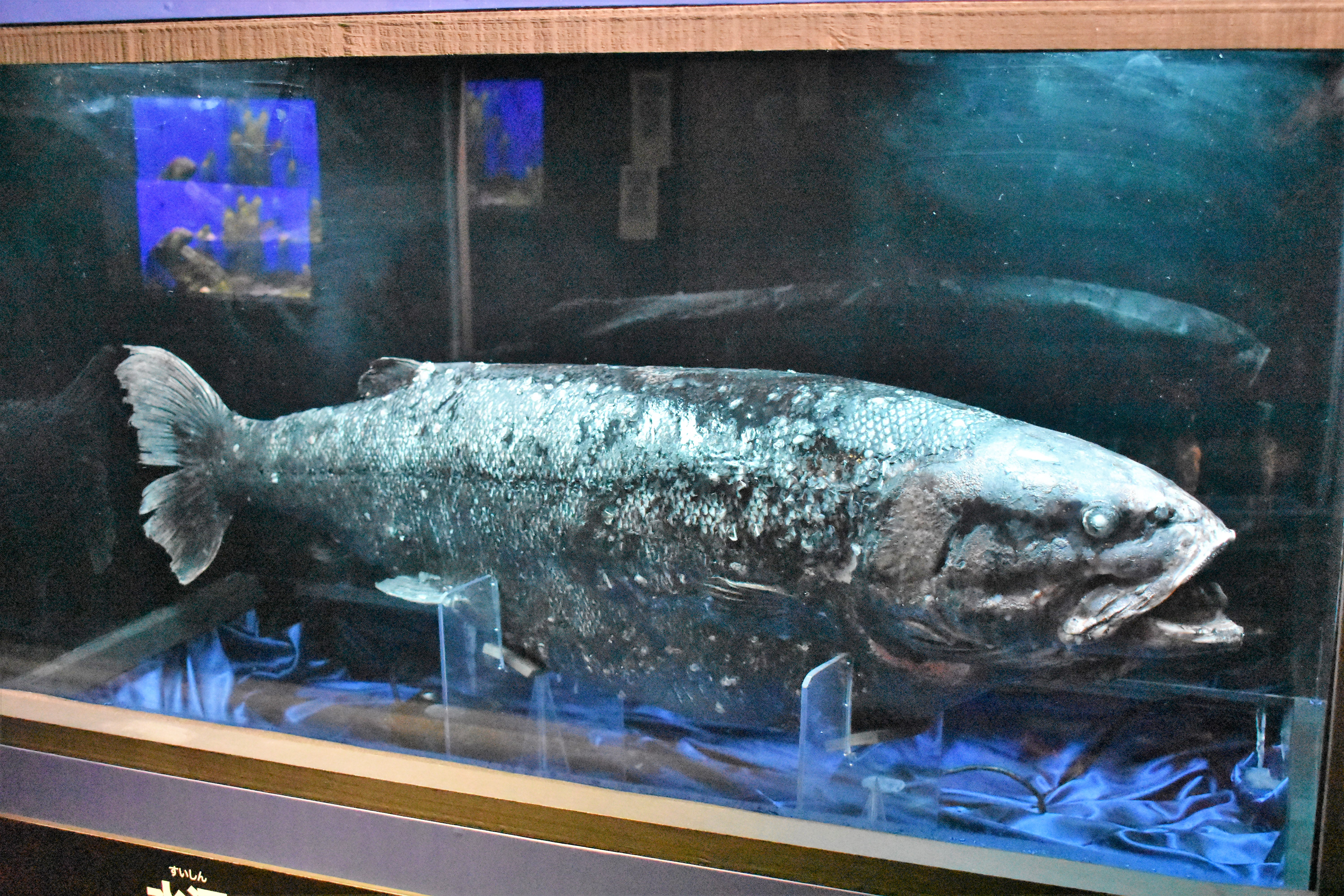
- Specimen at Sunshine Aquarium

Scientific classification
- Kingdom: Animalia
- Phylum: Chordata
- Class: Actinopterygii
- Order: Alepocephaliformes
- Family: Alepocephalidae
- Genus: Narcetes
- Species: N. shonanmaruae

Binomial name
- Narcetes shonanmaruae Poulsen, H. Ida, Kawato & Fujiwara, 2021

= Narcetes shonanmaruae =

Species of fish

Narcetes shonanmaruae, the yokozuna slickhead, is a species of large marine ray-finned fish, a slickhead belonging to the family Alepocephalidae. At over 2.5 metres (8.2 ft) in length, it is the largest species of slickhead, and the largest species of bony fish entirely restricted to the deep ocean.

It was first formally described in 2021, the description being based on four specimens which were collected below a depth of 2,171 m (7,123 ft) in Suruga Bay in Japan. Its largest verified size is 130 cm (51 in), however recent footage with a reference has given the fish a much larger estimated length of 253 cm (100 in), however unverified. The specific name references Shonan Maru, the ship the specimens were collected from. The proposed English name, yokozuna slickhead, refers to the highest ranking of sumo wrestler, the yokozuna.
