= Thomas Johannes Lauritz Parr =

Norwegian educator and psychologist (1862–1935)

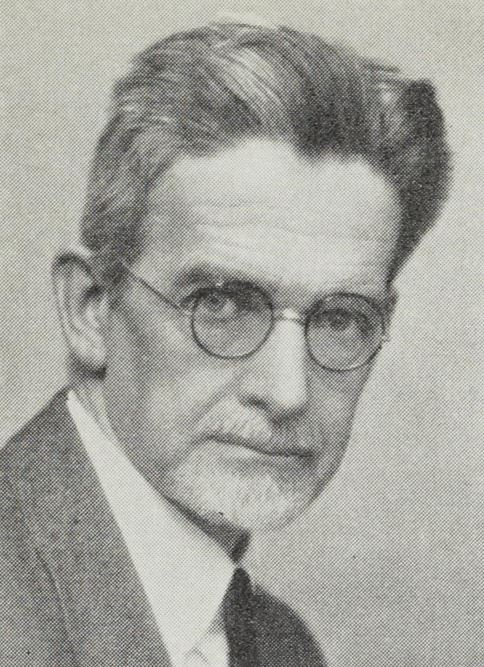
Norwegian psychologist and teacher Thomas Parr (1862–1935)

Thomas Johannes Lauritz Parr (13 May 1862 – 12 August 1935) was a Norwegian educator and psychologist.

He was born in Drøbak as a son of ship-owner Hans Henry Parr and Laura Jørgensen. In March 1897 in Bergen he married Helga Johanne Eide, a daughter of consul Ludolf Eide and sister of Egil Eide. The couple had the son Albert Eide Parr, a noted zoologist and oceanographer who married a daughter of Peder Hansen.

Parr finished Kristiania Commerce School in 1877, worked in an office for four years and from 1882 to 1883 he studied for, and took, the examen artium. He enrolled at the Royal Frederick University, and after one year of studying theology he switched to philology and graduated with the cand.philol. degree in 1890. He was hired as a teacher at Tanks Upper Secondary School in 1892 and Bergen Cathedral School in 1900. He retired for health reasons in 1929.

He was a modern pedagogical thinker for his time, and wrote prolifically in Samtiden, Vor Ungdom and Skolebladet as well as the newspaper Bergens Tidende. He also became known a pamphlet in 1918, in which he tried to counter the ideas of the comprehensive school whose inception was prepared by a special committee at that time. He was also interested in moral and psychology, and publicly debated these subjects from the 1890s. From 1899 to 1900 he conducted a study travel to Germany. In 1912 he issued the book Følelsesbetoningens intellektuelle egenverdi. It was later expanded into a German-language thesis, Der intellektuelle Eigenwert der Gefühlsbetonung in 1922, but already in 1913 he successfully submitted the dissertation for the dr.philos. degree. He also published academically in French and English. He was hired as a part-time lecturer at Bergen Museum, and from 1917 he was a fellow of the Norwegian Academy of Science and Letters.

He was described as a "noble character" who dedicated himself to counter all forms of cheating and promote academic honesty. At the same time he was derided for his "exaggerated, nervously determined diligence" and "pathological self-criticism". He died in August 1935 in Bergen.
