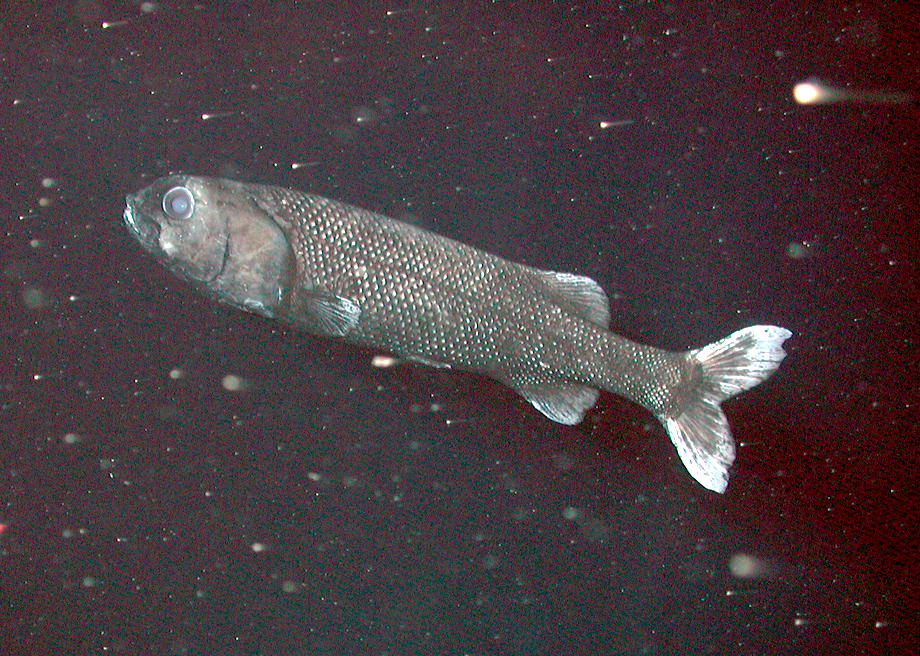
- California slickhead, Alepocephalus tenebrosus

Scientific classification
- Kingdom: Animalia
- Phylum: Chordata
- Class: Actinopterygii
- Order: Alepocephaliformes
- Family: Alepocephalidae
- Genus: Alepocephalus; Risso, 1820

Type species
- Alepocephalus rostratus Risso, 1820

= Alepocephalus =

Genus of fishes

Alepocephalus is a genus of slickheads found in all oceans.

== Species ==
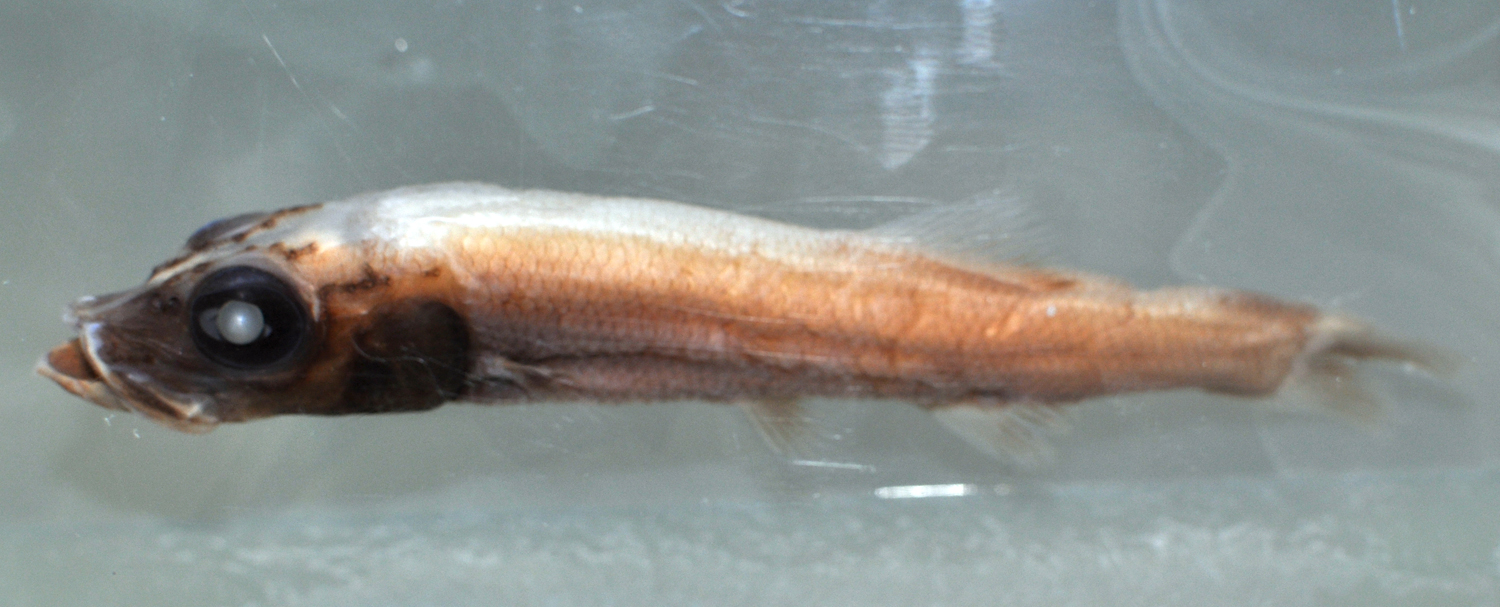
Alepocephalus sp.

There are currently 20 recognized species in this genus:

- Alepocephalus agassizii Goode & T. H. Bean, 1883 (Agassiz' slickhead)

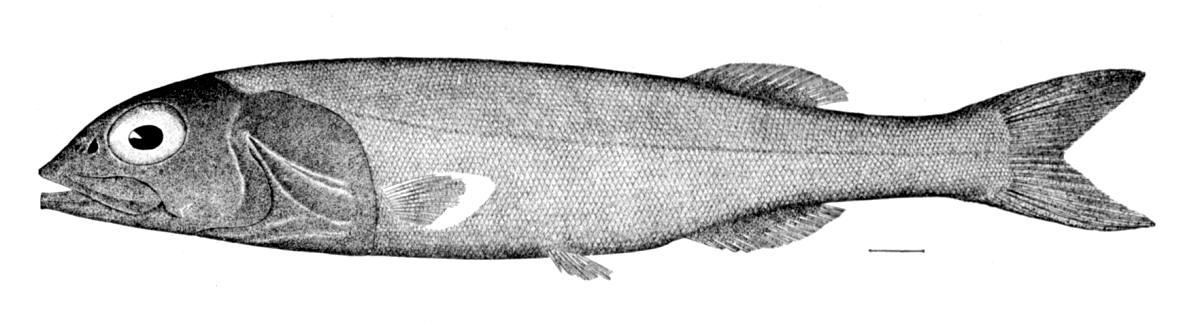
Agassiz' slickhead, Alepocephalus agassizii

- Alepocephalus andersoni Fowler, 1934
- Alepocephalus antipodianus (Parrott, 1948) (Antipodean slickhead)
- Alepocephalus asperifrons Garman, 1899
- Alepocephalus australis Barnard, 1923 (Small scaled brown slickhead)
- Alepocephalus bairdii Goode & T. H. Bean, 1879 (Baird's smooth-head)

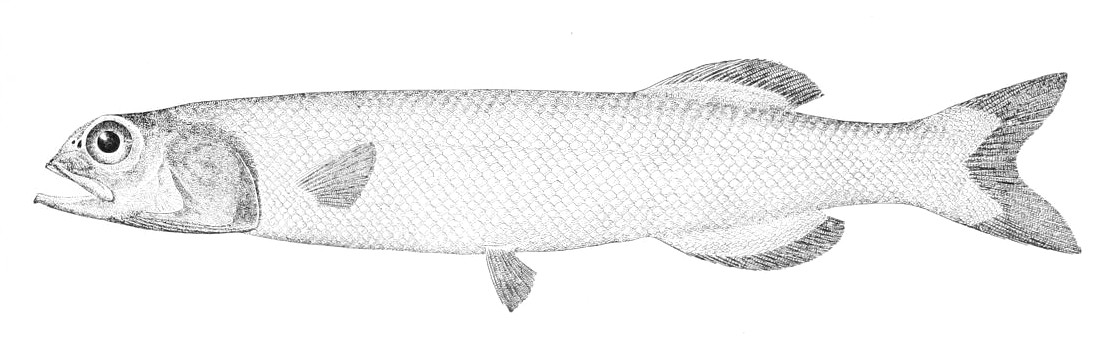
Baird's smooth-head, Alepocephalus bairdii

- Alepocephalus bicolor Alcock, 1891 (Bicolor slickhead)
- Alepocephalus blanfordii Alcock, 1892
- Alepocephalus dentifer Sazonov & Ivanov, 1979
- Alepocephalus fundulus Garman, 1899
- Alepocephalus longiceps Lloyd, 1909 (Longfin slickhead)
- Alepocephalus longirostris Okamura & Kawanishi, 1984 (Longsnout slickhead)
- Alepocephalus melas F. de Buen, 1961
- Alepocephalus owstoni S. Tanaka, 1908 (Owston's slickhead)
- Alepocephalus planifrons Sazonov, 1993

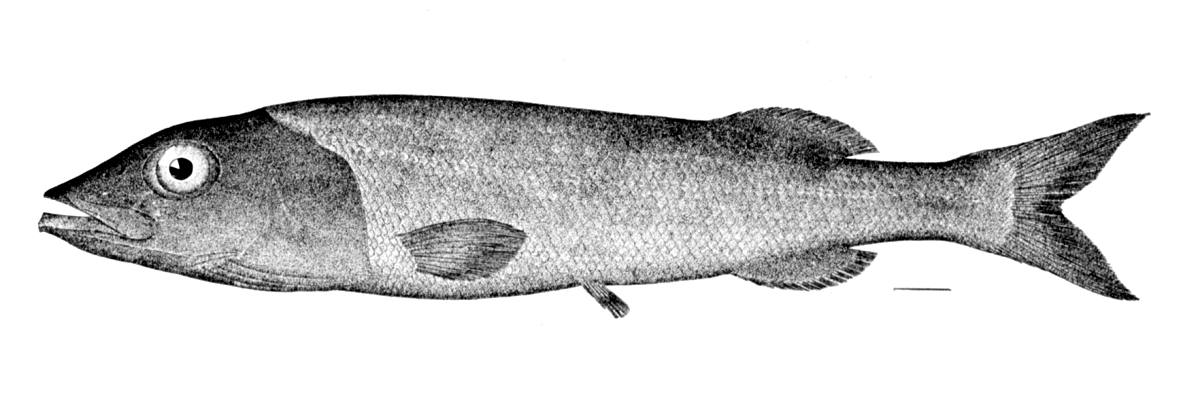
Smalleye smooth-head, Alepocephalus productus

- Alepocephalus productus T. N. Gill, 1883 (Smalleye smooth-head)
- Alepocephalus rostratus A. Risso, 1820 (Risso's smooth-head)
- Alepocephalus tenebrosus C. H. Gilbert, 1892 (California slickhead)
- Alepocephalus triangularis Okamura & Kawanishi, 1984 (Triangulate slickhead)

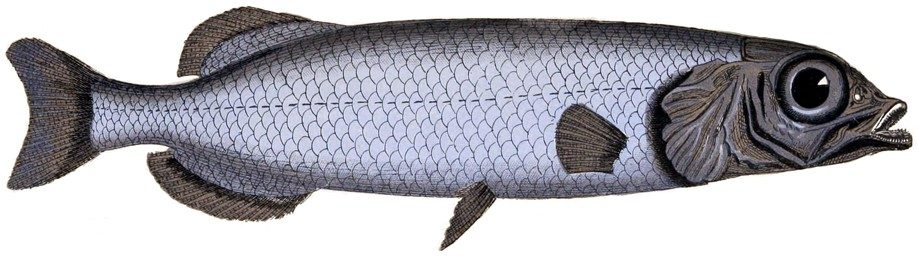
Risso's smooth-head, Alepocephalus rostratus

- Alepocephalus umbriceps D. S. Jordan & W. F. Thompson, 1914 (Slickhead)
