= Peder Hansen (politician) =

Norwegian politician

Peder Hansen (28 December 1859 – 26 May 1924) was a Norwegian politician for the Moderate Liberal Party.

He was born at Hage in Fuse Municipality as a son of farmers Hans Johannesen Hage and Gurine Nilsdatter. He started his professional career as a smith at the shipyard Laksevaag maskin- og jernskibsbyggeri in 1877. In 1894 he advanced to foreman. From 1904 to 1911 he lived as a merchant in Kristiania, but in 1911 he settled as a farmer.

He was a member of the municipal council for Askøen Municipality, and also served as an elector while Norway had such a political system. He was elected to the Parliament of Norway in 1900. He served one term for the constituency of Søndre Bergenhus Amt before being a deputy representative during the term 1904–1906.

Together with Hedvig Johannesen he had a daughter, Ella Hage Hanssen (1900–1991), a painter who married zoologist and oceanographer Albert Eide Parr, a son of scholar Thomas Johannes Lauritz Parr.
