= Einar Laurentius Koefoed =

Norwegian marine biologist

Einar Koefoed
- Born: 26 July 1875; Copenhagen
- Died: 1 November 1963 (aged 88); Bergen, Norway
- Scientific career
- Fields: Fisheries science, ichthyology
- Institutions: Norwegian Institute of Marine Research

Einar Laurentius Koefoed (1875–1963) was a Danish-born marine biologist who spent most of his professional career in Norway.

== Taxon named in his honor ==
Searsia koefoedi (Koefoed's searsid) is named after Einar Koefoed. Also the genus Einara might be named after him.

== Taxon described by him ==
- See Category:Taxa named by Einar Laurentius Koefoed
