= Albert Eide Parr =

American marine biologist, zoologist and oceanographer

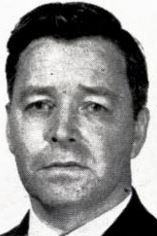
- Born: 15 August 1900; Bergen, Norway
- Died: 16 July 1991 (aged 90); Wilder, Vermont
- Citizenship: American
- Education: University of Oslo
- Occupations: Marine biologist Zoologist; Oceanographer
- Employer(s): Bergen Museum; Yale University; American Museum of Natural History
- Spouse: Ella Hage Hanssen (1900–1991)
- Father: Thomas Johannes Lauritz Parr

Albert Eide Parr (15 August 1900 – 16 July 1991) was an American marine biologist, zoologist and oceanographer. He was the director of the American Museum of Natural History from 1942 to 1959. Parrosaurus missouriensis, a species of plant-eating dinosaur, is named after him.

== Biography ==
Albert Eide Parr was born and grew up in Bergen, Norway. His father, Thomas Johannes Lauritz Parr, was a professor at Bergen Cathedral School. He became well acquainted with Jørgen Brunchorst, director at the Bergen Museum, and developed an early interest in marine biology. He studied at the University of Oslo (1921–24) and became cand.mag. in 1925. He worked was an assistant in zoology at the Bergen Museum from 1924 to 1926.

He and his wife traveled to the United States in 1926 where Parr is said to have first found work "sweeping floors" at the New York Aquarium in New York City. In 1927, he met American financier and philanthropist Harry Payne Bingham. They launched a series of marine biology expeditions. These expeditions continued for several years in collaboration with the Oceanographic Laboratory of Yale University, the Woods Hole Oceanographic Institution and the United States Bureau of Fisheries. In 1930 Bingham gave his collection to Yale University and established the Bingham Oceanographic Foundation for its support. This segued into the founding of the Bingham Oceanographic Laboratory at Yale University's Peabody Museum of Natural History.

Parr became Professor of Oceanography at Yale University in 1938. From 1938 to 1942, Parr was director of the Peabody Museum of Natural History and was associated with the Woods Hole Oceanographic Institution as a researcher and board member. From 1942 to 1959, he was Director of the American Museum of Natural History. In 1959, he left to become senior researcher at the museum. In 1968, he received the title director emeritus. Among his later research areas was the classification of Alepocephalidae fish.

== Personal life ==
In 1925, he was married to Ella Hage Hanssen (1900–1991), daughter of Peder Hansen, who was a member of the Parliament of Norway. He died in Wilder, Vermont during 1991 at 90 years old of age.

== Taxon described by him ==
- See Category:Taxa named by Albert Eide Parr

== Selected works ==
- A practical revision of the western Atlantic species of the genus Citharichthys – 1931
- The stomiatoid fishes of the suborder Gymnophotoderm – 1927
- A Contribution To The Osteology And Classification Of The Orders Iniomi And Xenoberyces – 1929
- Revision of the species currently referred to Alepocephalus, Halisauriceps, Bathytroctes and Bajacalifornia – 1952
- A new genus of Searsidae from Japan – 1953
- Mostly About Museums - 1959
- The fishes of the family Searsidae – 1960
- The Dreadful Lemon Sky - 1974. John D. MacDonald. Meyer quotes him "Whether you get an idea from looking into a sunset or into a beehive has nothing to do with its merits and possibilities."

== Taxon named in his honor ==
- Diaphus parri Tåning, 1932, the Parr's lanternfish, is a species of lanternfish found worldwide.
