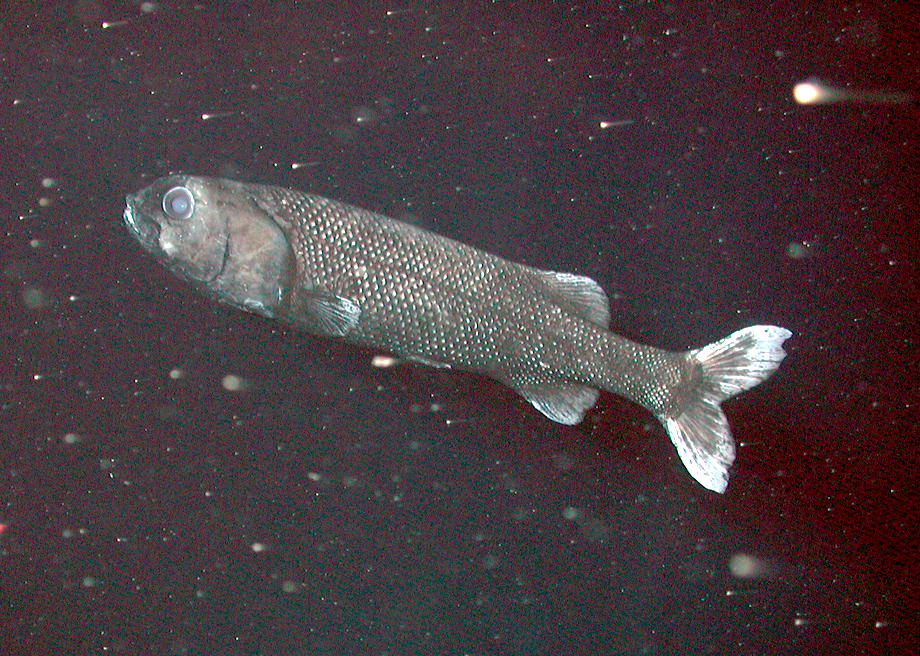
- California slickhead, Alepocephalus tenebrosus

Scientific classification
- Kingdom: Animalia
- Phylum: Chordata
- Class: Actinopterygii
- Superorder: Alepocephali
- Order: Alepocephaliformes
- Family: Alepocephalidae; Bonaparte, 1846

Genera
- see text

Synonyms
- Alepocephalini Bonaparte 1846; Leptochilichthyidae Marshall 1966; Bathyprionidae Marshall 1966; Bathypriidae Marshall 1966; Bathylaconidae Parr 1948; Aulastomatomorphinae Fowler 1934

= Alepocephalidae =

Slickheads Temporal range: Ypresian–present

Family of ray-finned fishes

Slickheads, also known as nakedheads or smoothheads, are deep water fishes that belong to the family Alepocephalidae. They are most commonly found in the bathypelagic layer, which is approximately 3,000 metres (9,840 ft) below the surface. They get their name from the lack of scales on their heads. Similarly, the scientific name is from the Greek ᾰ̓- (a-, "not"); λέπος (lepos, "scale"); and κεφαλή (kephalē, "head"). It has about 22 genera with ca. 96 species.

The only known fossil genus is Carpathichthys from the Early Oligocene of Poland, although an undescribed species of Bathyprion and several indeterminate taxa are also known from the same formation. Fossil otoliths are also known, dating to the Early Eocene.

== Genera ==
Alepocephalidae contains the following extant genera:

- Alepocephalus Risso, 1820
- Asquamiceps Zugmayer, 1911
- Aulastomatomorpha Alcock, 1890
- Bajacalifornia Townsend & Nichols, 1925
- Bathylaco Goode & T. H. Bean, 1896
- Bathyprion Marshall, 1966
- Bathytroctes Günther, 1878
- Conocara Goode & T. H. Bean, 1896
- Einara Parr, 1951
- Herwigia Nielsen, 1972
- Leptochilichthys Garman, 1899
- Leptoderma Vaillant, 1886
- Microphotolepis Sazonov & Parin, 1977
- Mirognathus Parr, 1951
- Narcetes Alcock, 1890
- Photostylus Beebe, 1933
- Rinoctes Parr, 1952
- Rouleina D. S. Jordan, 1923
- Talismania Goode & T. H. Bean, 1896
- Xenodermichthys Günther, 1878

== Description ==
The following characteristics are generally shared by the Alepocephalidae family:

Their mouths consist of 80 to 100 razor-sharp teeth, being rather small and feeble. They are shaped in an eel-like elongation, with large eyes, gill rakers that range from moderate to long and numerous, and spineless fins. The single dorsal fin is located posterior to the midpoint of the body and there is no adipose dorsal fin present, there is a pectoral fin ranging from small to rudimentary located below the mid-flank, 4–18 rays, if pelvic fins are present, they exist in the abdominal region, with the origin being before the origin of the dorsal fin, they have forked caudal fins, and a tube above the base of pectoral fin that connects to a luminous gland on the shoulder girdle. They have no swim bladder. Some species bear photophores.

Their early life development is from large eggs directly into yolk sac juveniles that travel in deep waters.

The largest species is the Yokozuna slickhead, Narcetes shonanmaruae, which is also the largest completely bathyal teleost fish.

== Behaviour ==
It's been thought that as the Alepocephalidae age, they move down layers in the ocean, (mesopelagic waters and bathypelagic waters) due to mostly adolescent Alepocephalidae being reported near the surface, although there have been sightings of juveniles only several meters above the sea floor, which could suggest that some species may travel between different depths throughout their life stages, a vertical shift.

Vertical shift could occur due to predation being higher close to the sea floor and/or warmer water having a larger abundance of plankton. Juvenile slickheads may have a preference to travel upwards to take advantage of the lack of predation and abundance of food to increase survival rates.

== Distribution ==
The species of Alepocephalidae are widely distributed throughout the world and can be found in the Atlantic, Indian, and western Pacific oceans, although they are difficult to find as they typically live around the bathypelagic layer of the ocean.
