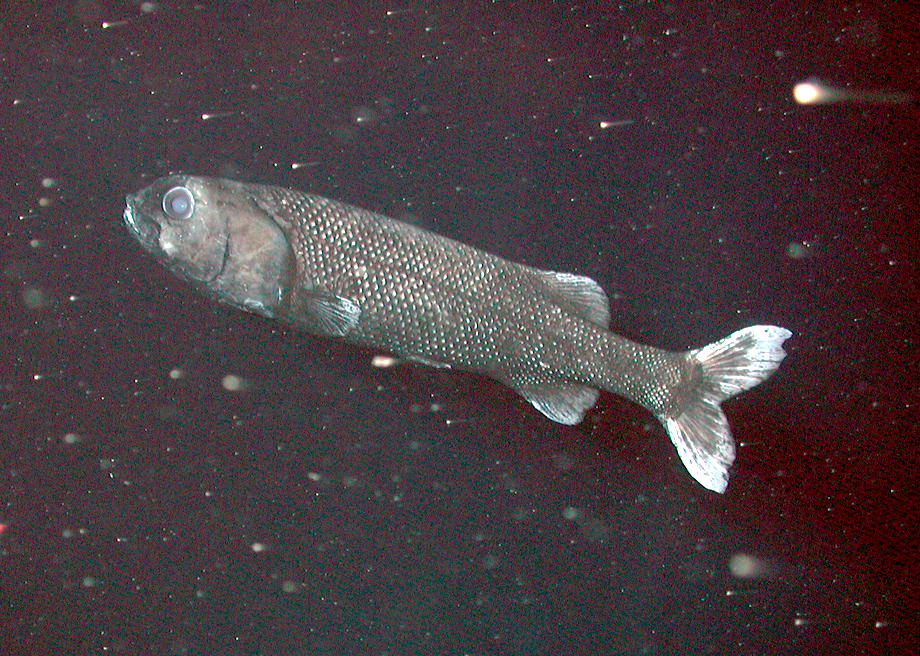
- California slickhead, Alepocephalus tenebrosus

Scientific classification
- Kingdom: Animalia
- Phylum: Chordata
- Class: Actinopterygii
- Division: Teleostei
- Cohort: Otocephala
- Superorder: Alepocephali
- Order: Alepocephaliformes; Marshall, 1962

Type species
- Alepocephalus rostratus

Families
- See text

= Alepocephaliformes =

Order of ray-finned fishes

Alepocephaliformes is an order of marine deep-sea teleost fishes. It was previously classified as the suborder Alepocephaloidei of the order Argentiniformes.

As an adaptation to a life in the deep-sea, they have no swim bladder, and the ossification of the skeleton is reduced. The largest known member is Narcetes shonanmaruae, the largest deep-sea-endemic bony fish.

== Subdivisions ==
- Family Alepocephalidae (typical slickheads) (includes former families Bathylaconidae; Leptochilichthyidae)
- Family Platytroctidae (including Searsiidae)
