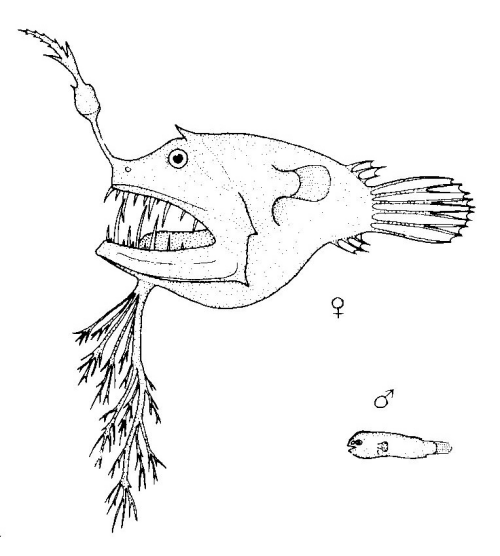
- Drawing by Dr Tony Ayling

Conservation status
- Least Concern (IUCN 3.1)

Scientific classification
- Kingdom: Animalia
- Phylum: Chordata
- Class: Actinopterygii
- Order: Lophiiformes
- Family: Linophrynidae
- Genus: Linophryne
- Species: L. arborifera

Binomial name
- Linophryne arborifera Regan, 1925

Synonyms
- Linophryne arborifer Regan, 1925; Linophryne eupogon Regan & Trewavas, 1932

= Linophryne arborifera =

Species of fish

Linophryne arborifera, one of the species referred to as the bearded seadevil, or alternatively the illuminated netdevil, is a deep-sea anglerfish of the family Linophrynidae, found in the bathypelagic zone of tropical and subtropical oceans. Like all ceratioids, the female is significantly larger than parasitic male.

== Characteristics ==
The literal translation of Linophryne arborifera from Greek is "tree-bearing flax-toad" (λίνον+φρύνος, arboriferous). Typical of the suborder, the female Linophryne has an esca, a luminous lure on her head derived from a fin ray, but she also possesses a branching hyoid barbel hanging from the lower jaw. The barbel filaments contain many more globular, bioluminescent organs. Linophrynids are further differentiated from other ceratioid families in having 3 dorsal fin- and anal fin-rays (rarely 2 to 4), 5 branchiostegal rays (rarely 4), and a sinistral anus (one which opens to the left). The eyes and nostrils of linophrynid males are very well developed; the eyes are unique among ceratioids in being forward-facing with a somewhat tubular shape.

This species is differentiated from congeners by characters of the esca and barbel; males of the genus cannot be differentiated in morphology. L. arborifera's esca is trifid, longer than the illicial stem + bulb, has been likened to a pearl onion, and contains luminous bacteria. The barbels, likened to fronds of seaweed, do not contain bacteria but complex paracrystalline photogenic granules; the many branching barbels are as long as the body and has filamentous tips. The esca is ectodermal in origin whereas the barbel organs may be derived from the mesoderm. At a length of up to 77 millimetres (3.0 in), females are significantly larger than the males, which reach only about 15 millimetres (0.59 in). Both sexes are pigmented after metamorphosis, being black in color. They have no scales and gelatinous skin.

== Distribution and habitat ==
Linophryne arborifera is bathypelagic, typically inhabiting depths of 200–1,000 metres (660–3,280 ft), with the holotype being collected at a depth of 200–300 metres (660–980 ft) in the north Atlantic. The deepest record for females is 1,645 metres (5,397 ft), while a male was collected 4,000 metres (13,000 ft) down. The species is thought to inhabit tropical and subtropical oceans, with specimens also found in the Pacific and Indian Oceans, although the IUCN only considers Atlantic records to be of this species.

== Biology ==
=== Feeding ===
Recorded prey of the genus Linophryne include fishes and crustaceans. Attached males obtain their nutrition from the female. They attach to the female with their jaws on her ventral surface. Blood vessels and tissues between them become integrated, allowing nutrients to pass from the female to the male.

Based on finding empty stomachs in captured free-living males, linophrynid males are thought to be unable to feed during their free-living stage after metamorphosis. Also, the "short and stout" denticulars of the upper and lower jaws of these males do not seem suitable for prey capture, and the alimentary canal is undeveloped. Current understanding is that free-living males die after a few months if they do not attach to a female.

=== Growth and reproduction ===
In the family Linophrynidae, males are obligatory sexual parasites. Attached males are nearly always found upside down, facing forward, and attached to the belly close to the anus. In all specimens found so far, only one male is attached to each female, which differs from some other angler fish species. Females without attached males and free-living males do not have well-developed gonads, so it seems that they must be attached for maturation and reproduction to occur. A 77-mm female Linophryne arborifera, with a 15-mm parasitic male, was observed to have numerous eggs embedded in a gelatinous mass (the "egg raft" or "veil", a characteristic of all lophiiform fishes) protruding from the genital opening; the eggs, 0.6–0.8mm in diameter, are among the largest known for any ceratioid.
