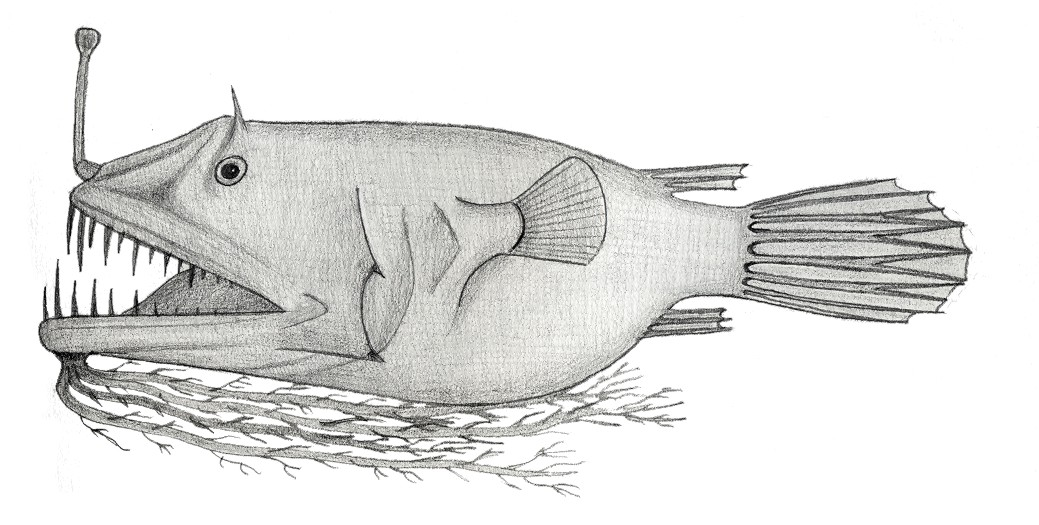

Conservation status
- Least Concern (IUCN 3.1)

Scientific classification
- Kingdom: Animalia
- Phylum: Chordata
- Class: Actinopterygii
- Order: Lophiiformes
- Family: Linophrynidae
- Genus: Linophryne
- Species: L. algibarbata

Binomial name
- Linophryne algibarbata Waterman, 1939

= Linophryne algibarbata =

Species of fish

Linophryne algibarbata is a species of marine ray-finned fish belonging to the family Linophrynidae, the leftvents. This fish occurs im the North Atlantic Ocean.

== Taxonomy ==
Linophryne algibarbata was first formally described in 1939 by the American zoologist Talbot Howe Waterman with its type locality given as the Western North Atlantic at 39°06'N, 70°16'W from a depth of 200 m (660 ft). Within the genus Linophryne this species is placed within the nominate subgenus. The 5th edition of Fishes of the World classifies this genus within the family Linophrynidae, which it places within the suborder Ceratioidei, the deep sea anglerfishes, within the order Lophiiformes, the anglerfishes.

== Etymology ==
Linophryne algibarbata is a member of the genus Linophryne, a name which prefixes linos, which means "net", an allusion Collett did not explain when he proposed the genus, with phryne, meaning "toad". The prefix may be a reference to the sac like mouth hanging off the trunk, which in the holotype contained a lanternfish, like a fisherman's keep net. The second part phryne is commonly used in the names of anglerfish genera. Its use may date as far back as Aristotle and Cicero, who referred to anglerfishes as "fishing-frogs" and "sea-frogs," respectively, possibly because of their resemblance to frogs and toads. The specific name, algibarbata, is a combination of algi or algae, meaning "seaweed", and barbata, meaning "bearded", an allusion Waterman did not explain but which is almost certainly a reference to the multi-branched hyoid barbel, resembling seaweed, possessed by the metamorphosed females of this species.

== Description ==
Linophryne algibarbata is sexually dimorphic, the metamorphosed females have a dorsal fin containing 3 soft rays with 2 or 3 soft rays in the anal fin. The metamorphosed females are distinguished from other bearded leftvents by the morphology of their esca which has a globose shape with a blunt ridge aroind its sides and on the tip and which has no appendages. The hyoid barbel is divided intp 4 main branches, each having a length equivalent to between 40% and 86& of the standard length. Each main branch of the barbel has a variable number of smaller branches growing from it, and these hav esmaller branches growing out of them, these smaller branches are rather filamentous and each had a photophore at its tip. The caudal peduncle has a high number of melanophores. The dwarf males have poited sphenotic spines. The largest published total length for this species is 23.1 cm (9.1 in) for a metamorphosed female, while the longest published total length for an amel is 4.1 cm (1.6 in).

== Distribution and habitat ==
Linophryne algibarbata is found in the North Atlantic Ocean from around 39° to 40°N and 67° to 70°W off New England, including Bermuda, to 67°N, east as far as Iceland. It is found at depths between 400 and 2,200 m (1,300 and 7,200 ft).
