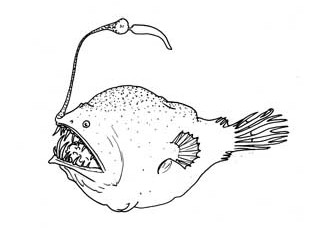

Conservation status
- Data Deficient (IUCN 3.1)

Scientific classification
- Kingdom: Animalia
- Phylum: Chordata
- Class: Actinopterygii
- Order: Lophiiformes
- Family: Linophrynidae
- Genus: Acentrophryne
- Species: A. dolichonema

Binomial name
- Acentrophryne dolichonema Pietsch & Shimazaki, 2005

= Acentrophryne dolichonema =

Species of angler fish

Acentrophryne dolichonema is a species of marine ray-finned fish belonging to the family Linophrynidae, the leftvents, a family of deep sea anglerfishes. This species is only known from the eastern Pacific Ocean off the coast of Peru.

== Taxonomy ==
Acentrophryne dolichonema was first formally described in 2005 by the ichthyologists Theodore Pietsch and Mitsomi Shimazaki with its type locality given as off Peru at 8°10.6' to 11.9'S, 80°32.0'-32.4'W from waters where the bottom depth was 1,061 to 1,105 m (3,481 to 3,625 ft). The 5th edition of Fishes of the World classifies this genus in the family Linophrynidae, within the suborder Ceratioidei, the deep sea anglerfishes, of the anglerfish order Lophiiformes.

=== Evolutionary history ===
Acentrophryne dolichonema is one of two species in the genus Acentophryne. This genus is known from the fossil record, as a single specimen was found in 1977 from a Miocene diatomaceous deposit in the Puente Hills of Southern California. This was initially tentatively identified as being A. longidens but its identity is now left open as Acentrophryne sp. as it was somewhat intermediate between the two known species. Acentrophryne leftvents are endemic to the eastern Pacific and are adapted to low oxygen environments. The fossil specimen from California suggests that this genus originated in the Miocene and that hypoxic environments were more widespread in the eastern Pacific, as these reduced the genus underwent a contraction in its distribution and subsequent allopatric speciation.

== Etymology ==
Acentrophryne dolichonema belongs to the genus Acentophryne, a name that prefixes a, meaning "without", to kentron, meaning "spine", a reference to the lack of a spine on the preoperculum. This is then suffixed with phryne, which means "toad", commonly used in the names of anglerfish genera. Its use may date as far back as Aristotle and Cicero, who referred to anglerfishes as "fishing-frogs" and "sea-frogs", respectively, possibly because of their resemblance to frogs and toads. The specific name, dolichonema, is a compound of dolichos, meaning "long" and nema, which means "thread", an allusion to the long, filamentous appendage near the tip of the esca in this species.

== Description ==
Acentrophryne dolichonema has 3 soft rays in both the dorsal and anal fin. This species is known only from metamorphosed females and these are distinguished from the metamorphosed females of A. longeidens by the possession of a longer appendage on the tip of the esca, this being over 10 times longer than that of A. longidens, and a longer illicium, which has a length equivalent to between 63.6% to 70.5% of the standard length. They also have a narrower head and fewer fin rays in the pectoral fin, 16 compared to 18 or 19 for A. longidens. This species has a maximum published standard length of 10.5 cm (4.1 in).

== Distribution and habitat ==
Acentrophryne dolichonema is apparently endemic to the Eastern Pacific and is known from three specimens collected from a single locality off northern Peru at depths between 201 and 1,105 m (659 and 3,625 ft).
