= Linophryne andersoni =

Conservation status
- Data Deficient (IUCN 3.1)

Scientific classification
- Kingdom: Animalia
- Phylum: Chordata
- Class: Actinopterygii
- Order: Lophiiformes
- Family: Linophrynidae
- Genus: Linophryne
- Species: L. andersoni

Binomial name
- Linophryne andersoni Gon,1992

Species of fish

Linophryne andersoni is a species of marine ray-finned fish belonging to the family Linophrynidae, the leftvents, a group of deep water anglerfishes. This species is found in deep water northeast of the Line Islands.

== Taxonomy ==
Linophryne andersoni was first formally described in 1992 by the South African ichthyologist Ofer Gon with its type locality given as northeast of the Line Islands at 11°49'N, 144°51'W from a depth of 0 to 50 m (0 to 164 ft). Within the genus Linophryne this species is placed within the subgenus Rhizophryne. The 5th edition of Fishes of the World classifies the genus Linophryne within the family Linophrynidae, which it places within the suborder Ceratioidei, the deep sea anglerfishes, within the order Lophiiformes, the anglerfishes.

== Etymology ==
Linophryne andersoni is a member of the genus Linophryne, a name which prefixes linos, which means "net", an allusion Collett did not explain when he proposed the genus, with phryne, meaning "toad". The prefix may be a reference to the sac like mouth hanging off the trunk, which in the holotype contained a lanternfish, like a fisherman's keep net. The second part phryne is commonly used in the names of anglerfish genera. Its use may date as far back as Aristotle and Cicero, who referred to anglerfishes as "fishing-frogs" and "sea-frogs," respectively, possibly because of their resemblance to frogs and toads. The specific name, andersoni, honours M. Eric Anderson, an ichthyologist at the J. L. B. Smith Institute of Ichthyology.

== Description ==
Linophryne andersoni is known only from the holotype which had 3 softrays in both the dorsal and anal fin. The holotype was a metamophosed female which had the following distinguishing characteristics. The bulb of the esca which is globular and has a low, rounded prolongation at its tip which has no appendages. The esca also has two pairs of appendages on its side towards the rear, the inner pair are short while the outer pair are less than half the diameter of the escal bulb and each has a clump of short filaments at its tip. the hyoid barbel is split near its base into a median and two lateral main branches. The caudal peduncle has a series of large subdermal melanophores on its lower side. The standard length of the holoptype was 3.2 cm (1.3 in).

== Distribution, habitat and biology ==
Linophryne andersoni is known only from its type locality, northeast of the Line Islands, and from only a single specimen so little is known of its distribution and life history.
