= Linophryne macrodon =

Conservation status
- Least Concern (IUCN 3.1)

Scientific classification
- Kingdom: Animalia
- Phylum: Chordata
- Class: Actinopterygii
- Division: Teleostei
- Order: Lophiiformes
- Family: Linophrynidae
- Genus: Linophryne
- Species: L. macrodon

Binomial name
- Linophryne macrodon Regan, 1925

Species of fish

Linophryne macrodon is a species of marine ray-finned fish belonging to the family Linophrynidae, the leftvents, a group of deep water anglerfishes. The species lives in waters 300 to 1000 meters (980 to 3280 feet) deep in the eastern Pacific and western Atlantic Oceans.

== Taxonomy ==
Linophryne macrodon was first formally described in 1925 by the English ichthyologist Charles Tate Regan with its type locality given as the Gulf of Panama 6°48'N, 80°33'W from a depth of around 1,750 m (5,740 ft), collected by the Danish research vessel Dana. This species classified within the nominate subgenus of Linophryne. The 5th edition of Fishes of the World classifies Linophryne within the family Linophrynidae, which it places within the suborder Ceratioidei, the deep sea anglerfishes, within the order Lophiiformes, the anglerfishes.

== Etymology ==
Linophryne macrodon is classified within the genus Linophryne, an name which prefixes linos, which means "net", an allusion Collett did not explain when he proposed the genus, with phryne, meaning "toad". The prefix may be a reference to the sac like mouth hanging off the trunk, which in the holotype contained a lanternfish, like a fisherman's keep net. The second part phryne is commonly used in the names of anglerfish genera. Its use may date as far back as Aristotle and Cicero, who referred to anglerfishes as "fishing-frogs" and "sea-frogs," respectively, possibly because of their resemblance to frogs and toads. The specific name, macrodon, means "large tooth", an allusion that was not explained by Regan, but it is probably a reference to the large widely spaced teeth, some of which are fang-like.

== Description ==
Females grow up to 9.1 cm in length, and have a single distal branched filament, that is half the diameter of the bulb. It has three branches along each side of the bulb, that can be 3 times the diameter of the bulb, and have subdermal pigment on the caudal peduncle. Males are smaller, at only 2.2 cm in length, and have pointed sphenotic spines. The eggs of L. macrodon are only 1 mm in diameter.

== Distribution and habitat ==
Linophryne macrodon has been recorded from the Gulf of Maine, the Bear Seamount at 39°52'N, 67°27'W, Bermuda and the Gulf of Mexico in the centreal Western Atlantic. It has also been recorded from the Gulf of Panama in the eastern central Pacific. This is a bathypelagic species found at depths between 300 and 1,000 m (980 and 3,280 ft), over seamounts.

== Specimens ==
All the specimens of L. macrodon have been caught from non-closing nets, from depths to 1000 m (3280 ft), but one that was 44 mm was taken at only 300 m (980 ft) deep from a bottom haul in the mesopelagic zone.
