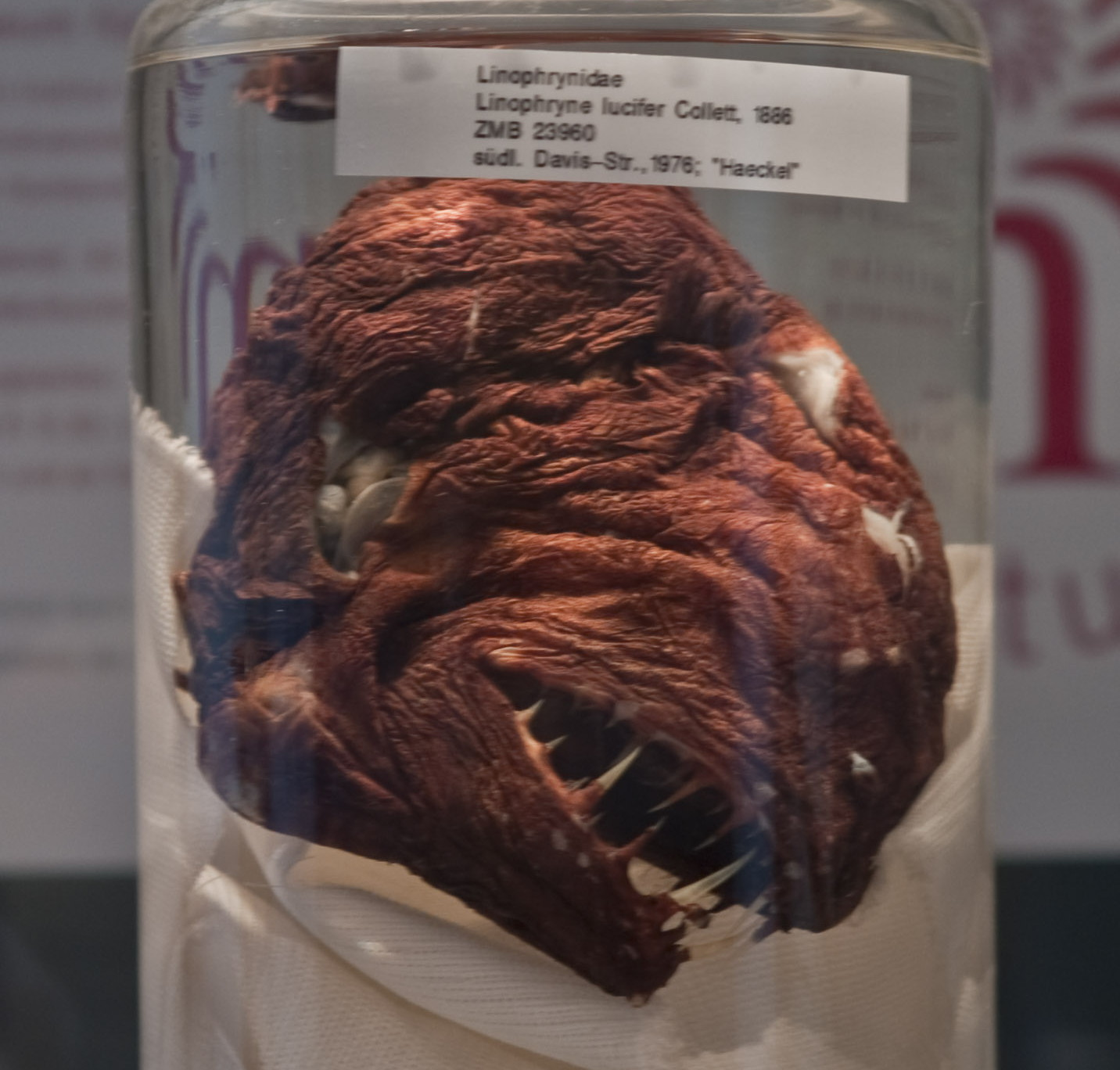

Conservation status
- Least Concern (IUCN 3.1)

Scientific classification
- Kingdom: Animalia
- Phylum: Chordata
- Class: Actinopterygii
- Division: Teleostei
- Order: Lophiiformes
- Family: Linophrynidae
- Genus: Linophryne
- Species: L. lucifer

Binomial name
- Linophryne lucifer Collett, 1886

Synonyms
- Linophryne digitopogon Balushkin & Trunov, 1988

= Linophryne lucifer =

Species of fish

Linophryne lucifer, one of the species known as the bearded anglerfish, is a species of marine ray-finned fish belonging to the family Linophrynidae, the leftvents, a group of deep water anglerfishes. This species, the type of genus Linophryne, is found in the North Atlantic Ocean.

== Taxonomy ==
Linophryne lucefer was first formally described in 1886 by the Norwegian zoologist Robert Collett with its type locality given as off Madeira at approximately 36°N, 20°W, the holotype being found floating on the surface. When Collett described this species he proposed a new monospecific genus, Linophryne, for it, meaning that L. lucifer is the type species of that genus by monotypy. As this species is the type species of its genus is placed in the nominate subgenus of Linophryne. The 5th edition of Fishes of the World classifies this genus within the family Linophrynidae, which it places within the suborder Ceratioidei, the deep sea anglerfishes, within the order Lophiiformes, the anglerfishes.

== Etymology ==
Linophryne lucifer is the type species of the genus Linophryne, an name which prefixes linos, which means "net", an allusion Collett did not explain when he proposed the genus, with phryne, meaning "toad". The prefix may be a reference to the sac like mouth hanging off the trunk, which in the holotype contained a lanternfish, like a fisherman's keep net. The second part phryne is commonly used in the names of anglerfish genera. Its use may date as far back as Aristotle and Cicero, who referred to anglerfishes as "fishing-frogs" and "sea-frogs," respectively, possibly because of their resemblance to frogs and toads. The specific name, lucifer, means "light bearer", an allusion to the hyoid barbel, Collett correctly suspected that the barbel is phosphorescent in life, although it is more properly called bioluminescent.

The name "forkbarbelthroat" was coined by D. E. McAllister in his 1990 book A List of the Fishes of Canada, being one of many common names he conceived in the book (French: gorge à barbe fourchue). These common names were subsequently used in the Encyclopedia of Canadian Fishes by Brian W. Coad. In a review of Coad's book, Erling Holm remarked that many of the names coined by Mcallister differed significantly from the standard set by Robins et al., deemed widely accepted, and promoted by the Committee on Names of Fishes. For the names of deep-sea fish (including "forkbarbelthroat"), which are unlikely to have day-to-day use, Holm deemed the names "unnecessarily complex, easily misspelled, or downright silly".

== Description ==
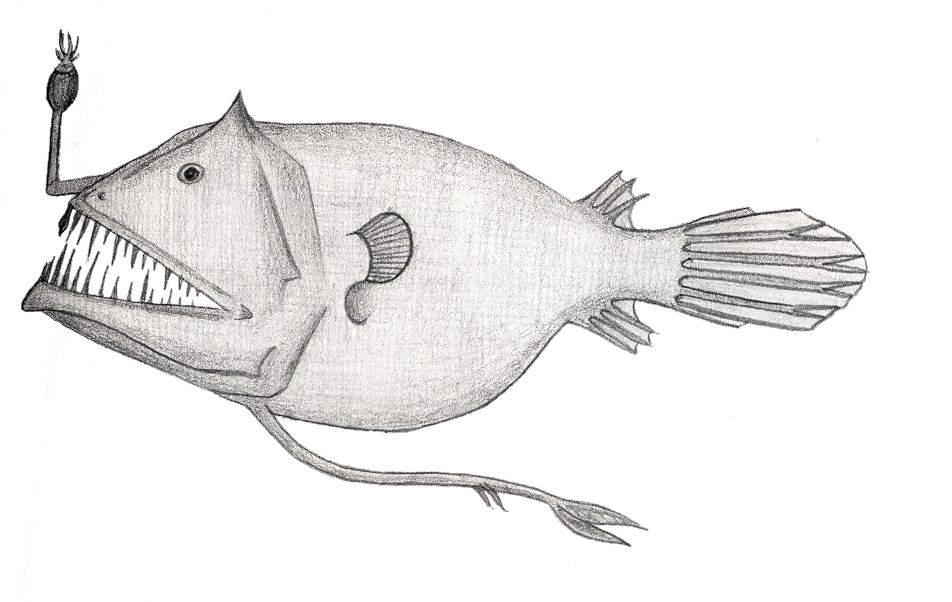

Linophryne lucifer, like other deep sea anglerfishes is sexually dimorphic. The metamorphosed females are distinguished from those of related species having an illicium which has a length equivalent to between 10% and 30% of the standard length. This is tipped with an esca which has a short conical projection at its tip which has between 2 and 8 thick filaments on it. There is another small appendage to the rear of the escal pore. The hyoid barbel has a length that is equivalent to between 40% and 75% of the standard length and has two blade shape appendages towards its tip, these have a length of between 6% and 17% of the standard length. The barbel appendages have a few photophores at their tips. The males are sexual parasites and have well-developed sphenotic spines. The maximum published standard length for a female of this species is 27.5 cm (10.8 in), while for a male it is 2.9 cm (1.1 in).

== Distribution and habitat ==
Linophryne lucifer is found in the North Atlantic Ocean which has been collected from the costs of Madeira, Newfoundland and Iceland. It is a bathypelagic species that has been recorded at depths between 0 and 1,000 m (0 and 3,281 ft), typically between 300 and 600 m (980 and 1,970 ft).

== Biology ==
L. lucifer shows extreme sexual dimorphism; the smaller males are obligatory sexual parasites and have to connect to a female within a short time of metamorphosing into an adult. The female has a short body and a large head with a wide mouth which is armed with long, slender asymmetrically arranged front teeth. The illicium and bioluminescent esca are used to lure prey. In both sexes the gonads do not mature until the male merges with the female as a sexual parasite, although a single female may have more than one parasitic male.
