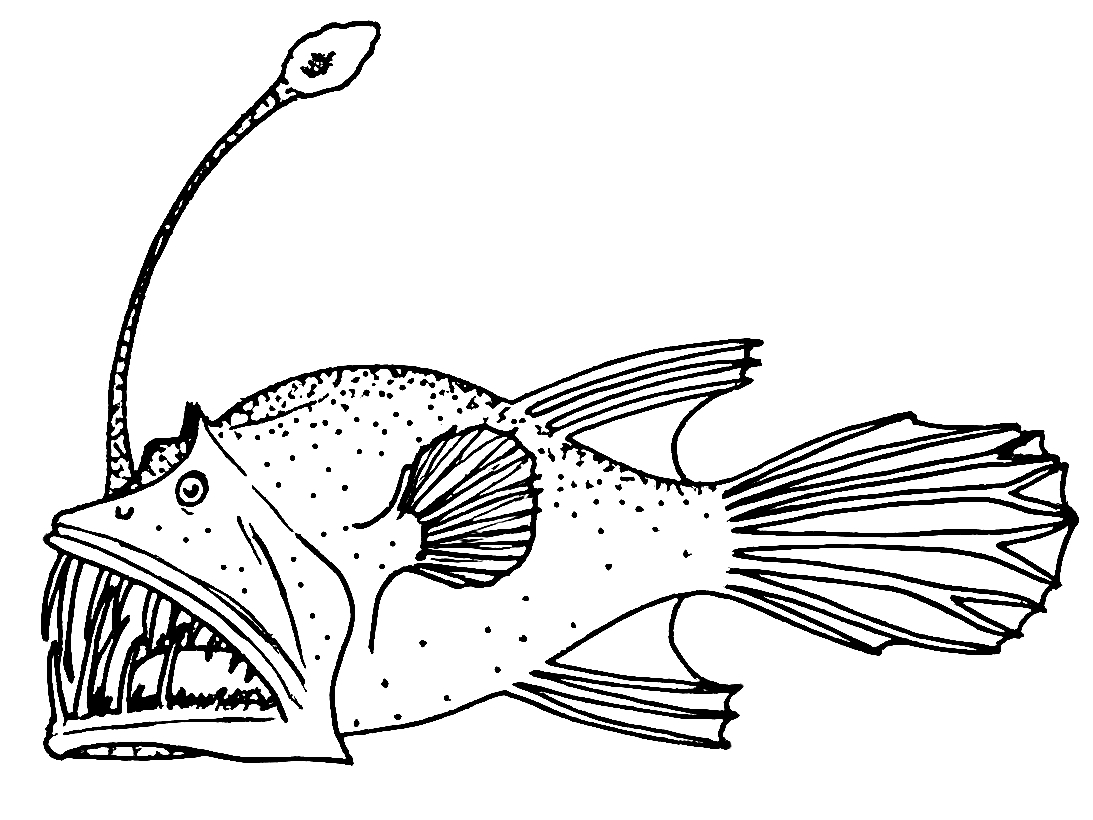

Conservation status
- Data Deficient (IUCN 3.1)

Scientific classification
- Kingdom: Animalia
- Phylum: Chordata
- Class: Actinopterygii
- Order: Lophiiformes
- Family: Linophrynidae
- Genus: Acentrophryne
- Species: A. longidens

Binomial name
- Acentrophryne longidens Regan, 1926

= Acentrophryne longidens =

Species of fish

Acentrophryne longidens is a species of marine ray-finned fish belonging to the family Linophryidae, the leftvents, a family of deep sea anglerfishes. This species is only known from the eastern Pacific Ocean off the coast of Costa Rica and Panama.

== Taxonomy ==
Acentrophryne longidens was first formally described in 1926 by the English ichthyologist Charles Tate Regan with its type locality given as 7°30'N, 79°19'W in the Gulf of Panama from a depth of around 1,250 m (4,100 ft), the holotype being collected by the Danish research vessel Dana. When Regan described this species he proposed that it be placed in the new monospecific genus Acentrophryne, making it the type species of that genus by monotypy. The 5th edition of Fishes of the World classifies this genus in the family Linophrynidae, within the suborder Ceratioidei, the deep sea anglerfishes, of the anglerfish order Lophiiformes.

=== Evolutionary history ===
Acentrophryne longidens is one of two species in the genus Acentophryne. This genus is known from the fossil record, as a single specimen was found in 1977 from a Miocene diatomaceous deposit in the Puente Hills of Southern California. This was initially tentatively identified as being 'this species but its identity is now left open as Acentrophryne sp. as it was somewhat intermediate between this species and Acentrophryne dolichonema. Acentrophryne leftvents are endemic to the eastern Pacific and are adapted to low oxygen environments. The fossil specimen from California suggests that this genus originated in the Miocene and that hypoxic environments were more widespread in the eastern Pacific, as these reduced the genus underwent a contraction in its distribution and subsequent allopatric speciation.

== Etymology ==
Acentrophryne longidens belongs to the genus Acentophryne, a name that prefixes a, meaning "without", to kentron, meaning "spine", a reference to the lack of a spine on the preoperculum. This is then suffixed with phryne, which means "toad", commonly used in the names of anglerfish genera. Its use may date as far back as Aristotle and Cicero, who referred to anglerfishes as "fishing-frogs" and "sea-frogs", respectively, possibly because of their resemblance to frogs and toads. The specific name, longidens, means "long teeth" an allusion to the long and robust teeth in both jaws of this species.

== Description ==
Acentrophryne longidens has 3 soft rays in both the dorsal and anal fin. This species is known only from metamorphosed females and these are distinguished from the metamorphosed females of A. dolichonema by the possession of a shortener appendage on the tip of the esca, this having a length equivalent to 2.3-2.5% of the standard length as opposed to 27.6% to 35.7% in A. dolichonema, and a shorter illicium, which has a length equivalent to between 35.7% and 54,9% of the standard length conmpared to 63.6% to 70.5% in A. dolichonema. They also have a broader head and more fin rays in the pectoral fin, 18 or 19 compared to 16 for A. dolichonema. This species has a maximum published standard length of 5 cm (2.0 in).

== Distribution and habitat ==
Acentrophryne longidens is known from two specimens which were collected from two separate localities in the Eastern Pacific Ocean, in the Gulf of Panama and south of Cabo Blanco in Costa Rica. Both specimens were collected at depths between 1,250 and 1,280 m (4,100 and 4,200 ft).
