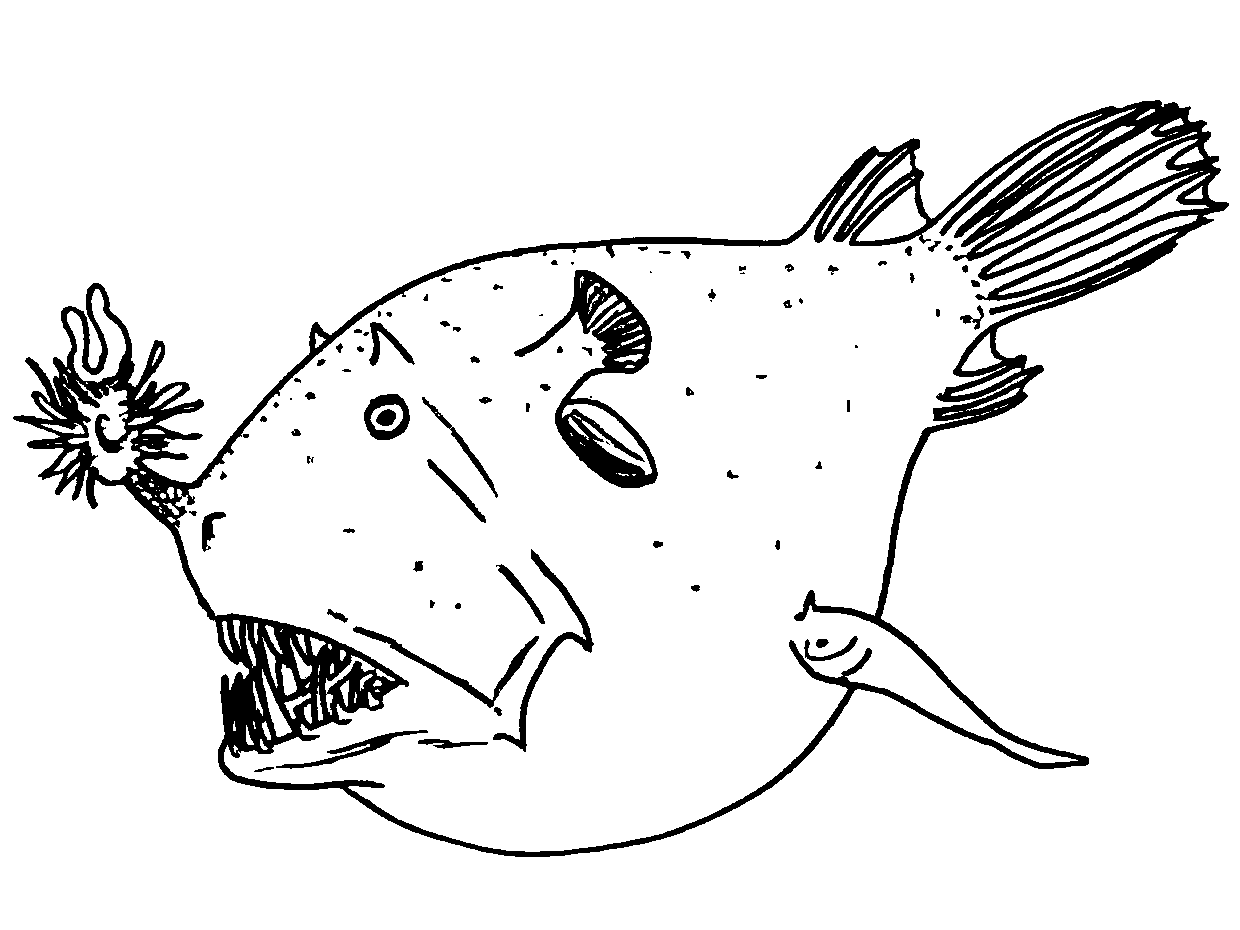
- Female with parasitic male attached to belly

Conservation status
- Least Concern (IUCN 3.1)

Scientific classification
- Kingdom: Animalia
- Phylum: Chordata
- Class: Actinopterygii
- Order: Lophiiformes
- Family: Linophrynidae
- Genus: Borophryne; Regan, 1925
- Species: B. apogon

Binomial name
- Borophryne apogon Regan, 1925

= Borophryne =

Borophryne Temporal range: Late Miocene to Recent

Species of fish

Borophryne apogon, the netdevil or greedy seadevil, is a species of leftvent anglerfish known today from the waters of the eastern Pacific Ocean off the Central American coast. It is found at depths down to around 1,750 m (5,700 ft). This species grows to a length of 8.3 centimetres (3.3 in) TL. A fossil specimen of this species has been found in the Los Angeles Basin dating back to the Late Miocene, some eight million years ago.

== Taxonomy ==
Borophryne was first proposed as a monospecific genus in 1925 by the English ichthyologist Charles Tate Regan when he described B. apogon as a new species. The holotype was collected by the Danish research vessel Dana and the type locality was given as the Gulf of Panama at 7°15'N, 78°54'W from a depth of around 1,700 m (5,600 ft). The 5th edition of Fishes of the World classifies this taxon in the family Linophrynidae, within the suborder Ceratioidei, the deep sea anglerfishes, of the anglerfish order Lophiiformes.

== Etymology ==
Borophryne is a combination of boros and phryne. Boros means "greedy" or "gluttonous", Regan did not explain this what this alluded to but it may be to the very large head of this anglerfish. Phryne, which means "toad", is commonly used in the names of anglerfish genera. Its use may date as far back as Aristotle and Cicero, who referred to anglerfishes as "fishing-frogs" and "sea-frogs", respectively, possibly because of their resemblance to frogs and toads. The specific name, apogon, means "without a beard" an allusion to the lack of a hyoid barbel, which is present in the leftvent genus Linophryne.

== Description ==
A metamorphosed female Borophryne apogon is globose, and grows to a maximum length of about 100 mm (4 in). The depth of the head is between 50% and 65% of the fish's standard length and the length of the head is between 50% and 60% of the standard length, with the lower jaw being four fifths of the length of the head. Three rows of long, sharp teeth line the jaws and there are up to four teeth on the roof of the mouth. The illicium on the snout is short and the esca on its tip is large with a branching terminal appendage and filaments on the side. There is a rounded protuberance on the forehead, the sphenotic spines (above the eyes) are large in young specimens but become overgrown with skin in older ones, and there is a symphysial spine at the tip of the jaw. The caudal peduncle is particularly short. The head and body are dark reddish-brown, or completely black, and the fins are usually colorless. The dorsal fin and the anal fin both have three soft rays, while the pectoral fins have fifteen to eighteen rays each, and the caudal fin has nine. This anglerfish is similar in appearance to Linophryne, but lacks the barbel on the chin.

A free-living metamorphosed male grows to a length of about 17 mm (0.7 in). It differs from other leftvent anglerfish in having no premaxillae and having large sphenotic spines. The jaws bear no teeth, but there are up to six or seven strong, short placoid scales above and below the mouth which meet when the jaws are closed. The olfactory organs are large and unpigmented, but the rest of the head and body is lightly pigmented and pale brown.

== Distribution ==
This species is found only in the tropical eastern Pacific. Its range extends from the lower Gulf of California to the Gulf of Panama, in an area delineated by 29°N to 7°N and 113°W to 78°W. It is a deep water fish and has been found in the bathypelagic zone at depths down to about 1,750 m (5,700 ft).

== Evolution ==
A fossil of Borophryne apogon and one of the closely related headlight angler (Linophryne indica) were found in Late Miocene laminated deposits in the eastern sector of the Puente Formation, California, during construction of a metro line subway station in Los Angeles. The assemblage of anglerfish included several other extant species of anglerfish.

== Biology ==
When a free-living male B. apogon encounters a female he latches onto her belly with his mouth and their tissues gradually fuse, with the male becoming parasitic. Free-living males and unparasitised females never have fully developed gonads, but after fusion, the male's gonads enlarge and he continues to grow, the largest known parasitic male being about 22 mm (0.9 in) long.
