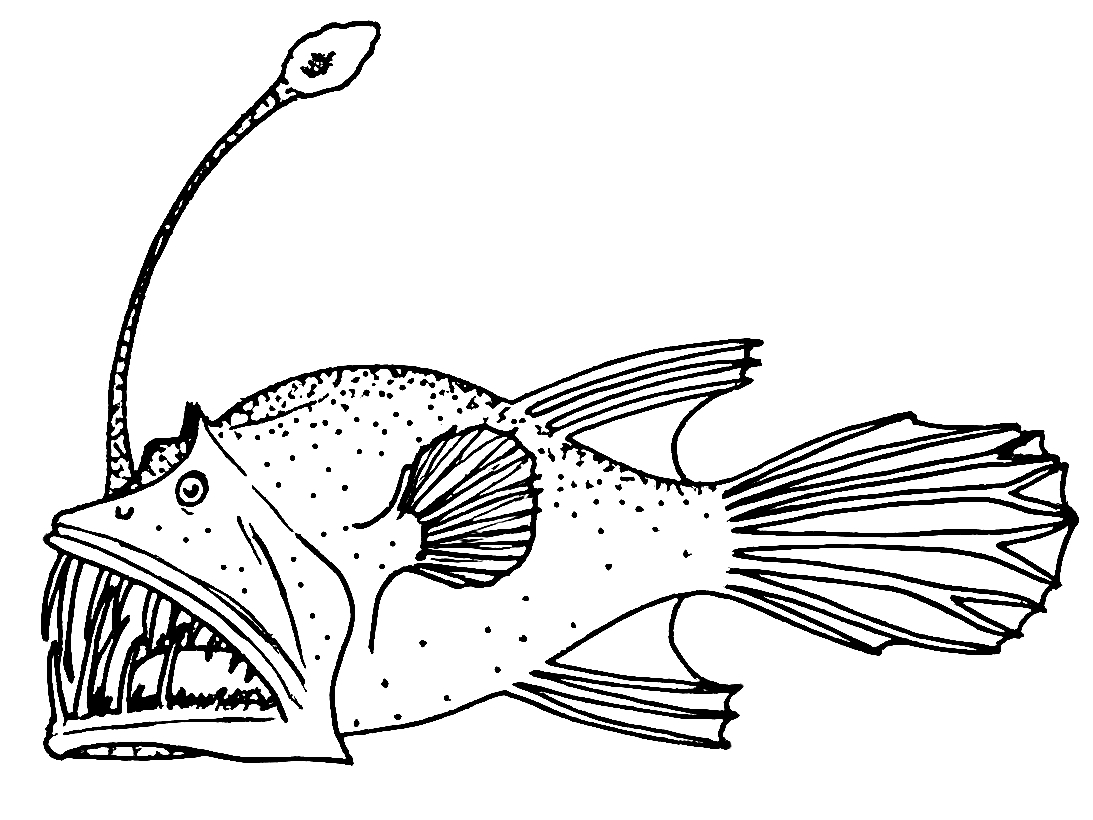
- A. longidens

Scientific classification
- Kingdom: Animalia
- Phylum: Chordata
- Class: Actinopterygii
- Order: Lophiiformes
- Family: Linophrynidae
- Genus: Acentrophryne; Regan, 1926

Type species
- Acentrophryne longidens Regan, 1926

= Acentrophryne =

Acentrophryne Temporal range: Late Miocene to Recent

Genus of fishes

Acentrophryne is a genus of deep-sea anglerfish in the family Linophrynidae, the leftvents, known from the eastern Pacific Ocean. Fossils of the type species, A. longidens, have been found in Late Miocene-aged Puente Formation of Rosedale, California.

== Taxonomy ==
Acentrophryne was first proposed as a monospecific genus in 1926 by the English ichthyologist Charles Tate Regan when he described Acentrophryne longidens as a new species. A. longidens was described by Regan from a holotype collected at 7°30'N, 79°19'W in the Gulf of Panama from a depth of around 1,250 m (4,100 ft) by the Danish research vessel Dana. The 5th edition of Fishes of the World classifies this genus within the family Linophrynidae, which it places within the suborder Ceratioidei, the deep sea anglerfishes, within the order Lophiiformes, the anglerfishes.

== Etymology ==
Acentrophryne prefixes a, meaning "without", to kentron, meaning "spine", a reference to the lack of a spine on the preoperculum. This is then suffixed with phryne, which means "toad", commonly used in the names of anglerfish genera. Its use may date as far back as Aristotle and Cicero, who referred to anglerfishes as "fishing-frogs" and "sea-frogs", respectively, possibly because of their resemblance to frogs and toads.

== Species ==
Acentrophryne contains the following recognized valid species:

- Acentrophryne dolichonema Pietsch & Shimazaki, 2005
- Acentrophryne longidens Regan, 1926

== Characteristics ==
Acentrophryne is known only from metamorphosed females; the males and larvae are unknown. These females differ from the other genera of leftvents by the absence of a spine on the preoperculum. They also have no spines on the frontal, epiotic, and posttemporal bones and a smaller number of teeth, 6 to 26 premaxillary teeth and 9 to 16 on each side of the lower jaw. These teeth are very long and are arranged in two or three series of oblique rows, which overlap. There are also between 2 and 6 teeth on the vomer. The ninth ray of the caudal fin is around half the length of the eighth. The illicium has a length that is equivalent to between 35.7% and 70.5% of the standard length, and the esca has one distal appendage, which lacks pigment. There is no hyoid barbel. Apart from the distal appendage, these fishes are uniformly black. The largest species in the genus is A. dolichonema with a maximum published standard length of 10.5 cm (4.1 in).

== Distribution and habitat ==
Acentrophryne leftvents are known only from the eastern Pacific Ocean, where they have been recorded off Costa Rica, Panama, Colombia and Peru at depths between 201 and 1,280 m (659 and 4,199 ft).

== Fossil record ==
Acentophryne is known from the fossil record as a single specimen was found in 1977 from a Miocene diatomaceous deposit in the Puente Formation of Southern California. This was initially tentatively identified as being A. longidens but its identity is now left open as Acentrophryne sp.. Acentrophryne leftvents are endemic to the eastern Pacific and are adapted to low oxygen environments. The fossil specimen from California suggests that this genus originated in the Miocene and that hypoxic environments were more widespread in the eastern Pacific, as these reduced the genus underwent a contraction in its distribution and subsequent allopatric speciation.
