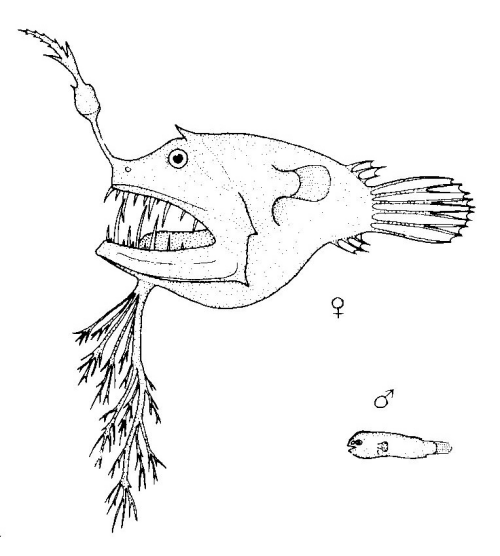
- L. arborifera
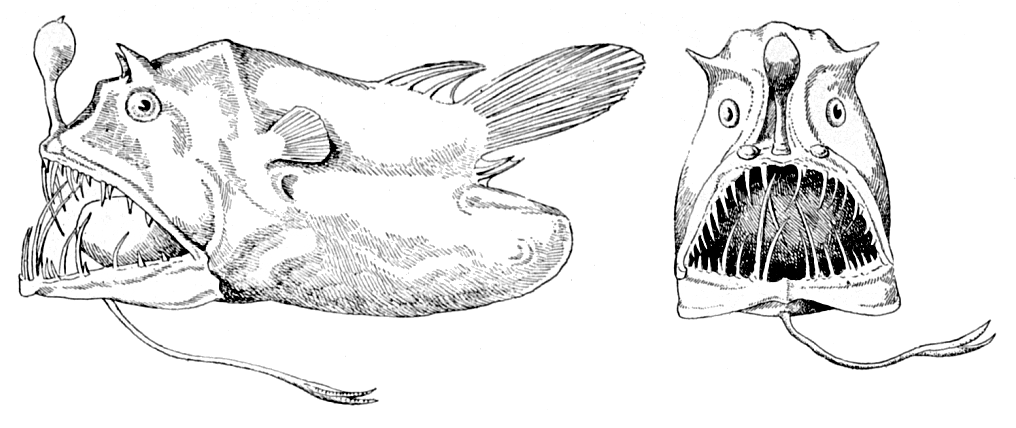
- L. lucifer

Scientific classification
- Kingdom: Animalia
- Phylum: Chordata
- Class: Actinopterygii
- Order: Lophiiformes
- Family: Linophrynidae
- Genus: Linophryne; Collett, 1886

Type species
- Linophryne lucifer Collett, 1886

Synonyms
- Aceratias Brauer, 1902; Allector Heller & Snodgrass, 1903; Anomalophryne Regan & Trewavas 1932; Diabolidium Beebe, 1926; Nannoceratias Regan & Trewavas, 1932; Rhizophryne Bertelsen, 1982; Stephanophryne Bertelsen, 1982

= Linophryne =

Linophryne Temporal range: Late Miocene to Recent

Genus of fishes

Linophryne, the bearded seadevils, is a genus of marine ray-finned fishes belonging to the family Linophrynidae, the leftvents. These deep sea anglerfishes are found in the Atlantic, Indian and Pacific Oceans.

== Taxonomy ==
Linophryne was first proposed as a monospecific genus in 1886 by the Norwegian zoologist Robert Collett when he described L. lucifer as a new species. Collett gave the type locality of L. lucifer as off Madeira at around 36°N, 20°W. The 5th edition of Fishes of the World classifies this genus within the family Linophrynidae, which it places within the suborder Ceratioidei, the deep sea anglerfishes, within the order Lophiiformes, the anglerfishes.

== Etymology ==
Linophryne prefixes linos, which means "net", an allusion Collett did not explain when he proposed the genus, with phryne, meaning "toad". The prefix may be a reference to the sac like mouth hanging off the trunk, which in the holotype contained a lanternfish, like a fisherman's keep net. The second part phryne is commonly used in the names of anglerfish genera. Its use may date as far back as Aristotle and Cicero, who referred to anglerfishes as "fishing-frogs" and "sea-frogs," respectively, possibly because of their resemblance to frogs and toads.

== Characteristics ==
Linophryne leftvents are sexually dimorphic and the metamorphosed females can be distinguished from the other leftvent genera by a number of characters. These include the possession of a hyoid barbel, well-developed spines on the sphenotic bone and the preoperculum and a single nearly oval bulb on the esca with a short projection in its middle and has no appendages as well as a low number of fin rays in the dorsal and anal fins. The barbel filaments contain globular, bioluminescent organs. The barbels do not contain bacteria like the esca but complex paracrystalline photogenic granules. The esca is ectodermal in origin whereas the barbel organs may be derived from the mesoderm.

The different species are distinguished by characters of the esca and barbel; males of the genus cannot be differentiated in morphology. Both sexes are pigmented after metamorphosis, being black in color. They have no scales and gelatinous skin. The largest species in the genus is L. lucifer which has a maximum published standard length of 27.5 cm (10.8 in).

== Species ==
Linophryne contains 22 recognised species, these are divided into 3 subgenera:

- Subgenus Linophryne Collett, 1886
  - Linophryne algibarbata Waterman, 1939
  - Linophryne arcturi Beebe, 1926
  - Linophryne argyresca Regan & Trewavas, 1932
  - Linophryne bicornis Parr, 1927
  - Linophryne bipennata Bertelsen, 1982
  - Linophryne coronata Parr, 1927
  - Linophryne escaramosa Bertelsen, 1982
  - Linophryne lucifer Collett, 1886
  - Linophryne macrodon Regan, 1925
  - Linophryne maderensis Maul, 1961
  - Linophryne polypogon Regan, 1925
  - Linophryne racemifera Regan & Trewavas, 1932
  - Linophryne sexfilis Bertelsen, 1973
  - Linophryne trewavasae Bertelsen, 1978
- Subgenus Rhizophryne Bertelsen, 1982
  - Linophryne andersoni Gon, 1992
  - Linophryne arborifera Regan, 1925
  - Linophryne brevibarbata Beebe, 1932
  - Linophryne densiramus S. Imai, 1941 (Thickbranch angler)
  - Linophryne parini Bertelsen, 1980
  - Linophryne pennibarbata Bertelsen, 1980
- Subgenus Stephanophryne Bertelsen, 1982
  - Linophryne indica Brauer, 1902 (Headlight angler)
  - Linophryne quinqueramosus Beebe & Crane, 1947

=== Fossil record ===
Linophryne is represented in the fossil record by what may be L. indica was found in Late Miocene-aged Puente Formation of Los Angeles, California, along with a fossil of the related Borophryne apogon, during the construction of a metrorail.

== Distribution and habitat ==
Linophryne is found circumglobally in all three equatorial Oceans, up to as far north as Iceland and Greenland in the Atlantic Ocean. They are found at depths between 0 and 2,200 m (0 and 7,218 ft).

== Gallery ==
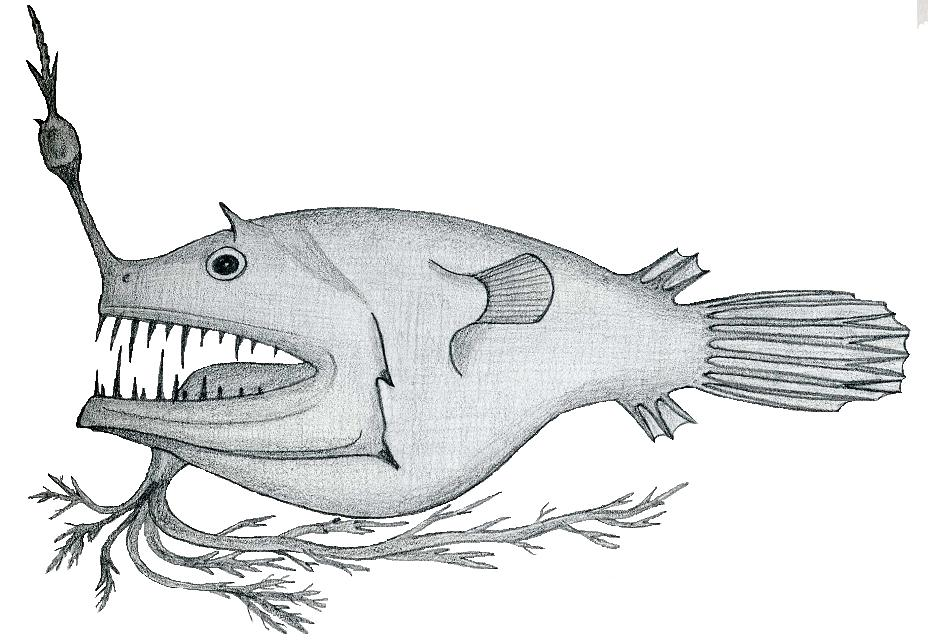
L. arborifera

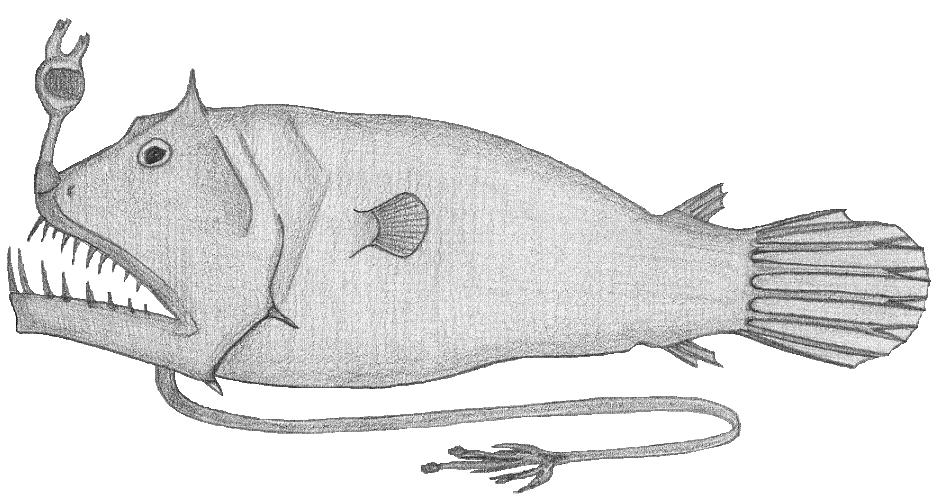
L. coronata

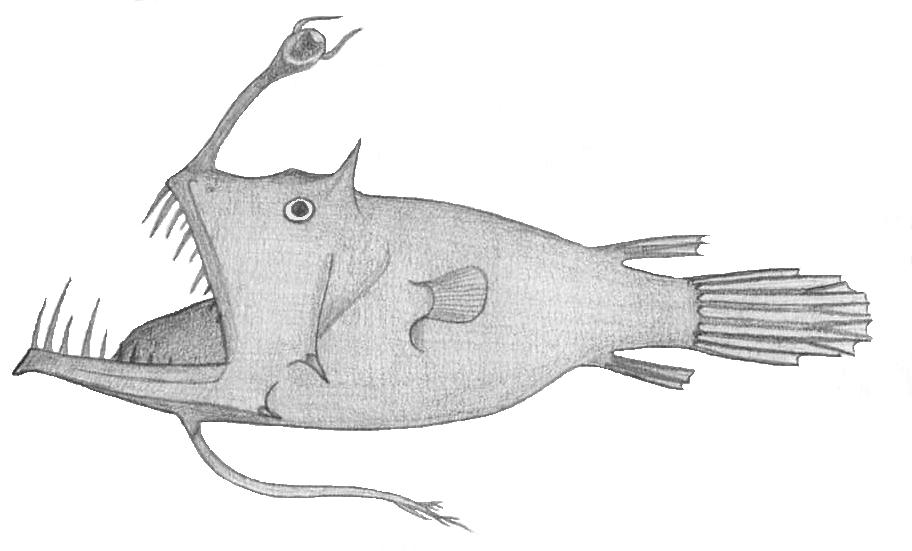
L. maderensis

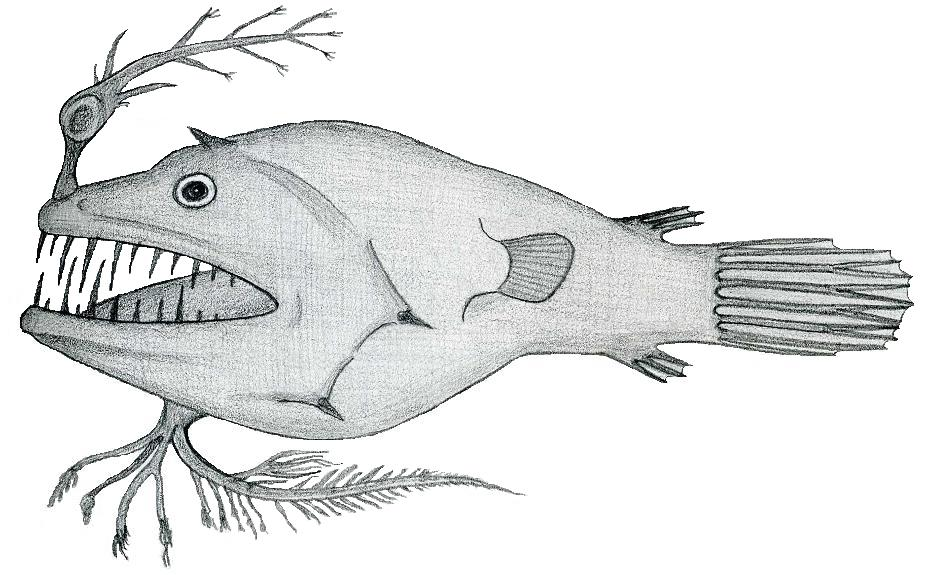
L. pennibarbata

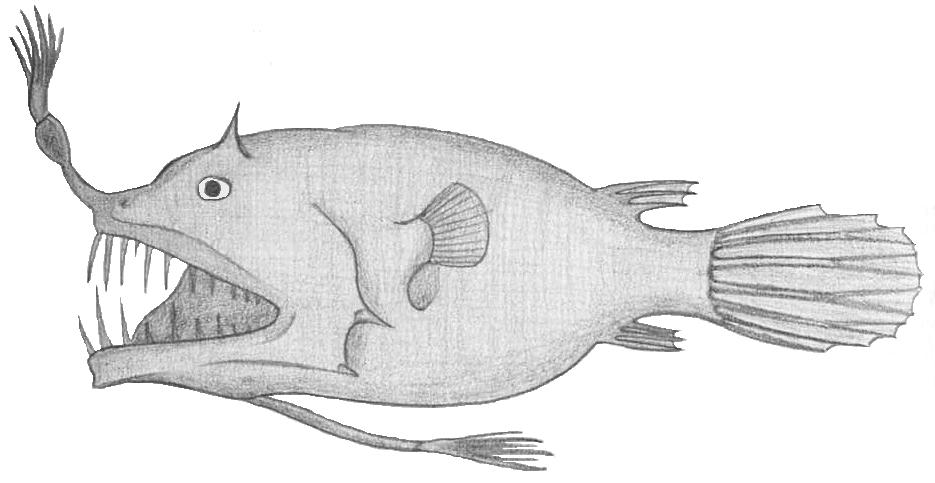
L. sexfilis

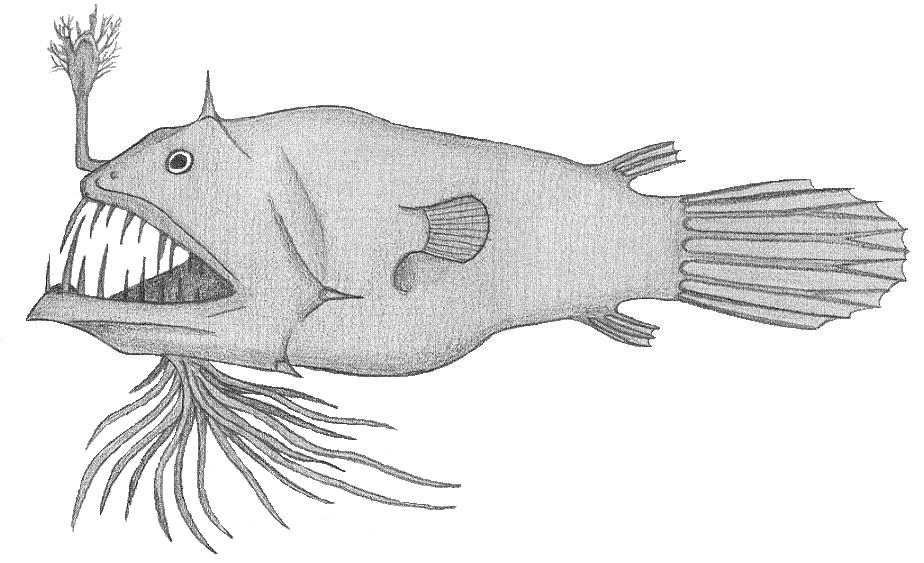
L. polypogon
