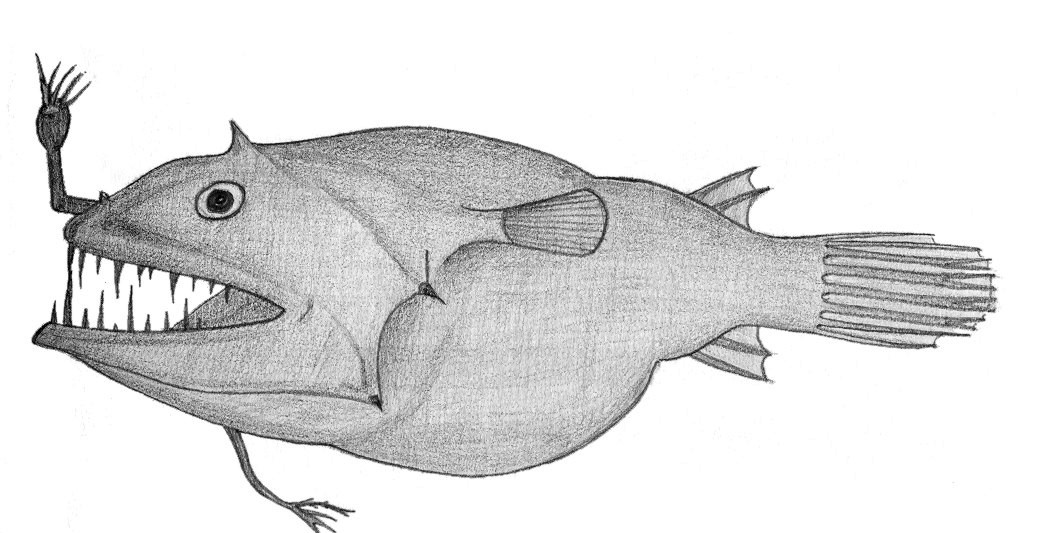
- Adult female
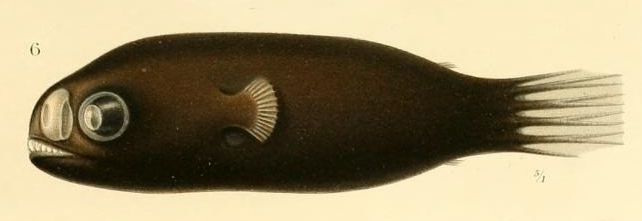
- Male

Conservation status
- Least Concern (IUCN 3.1)

Scientific classification
- Kingdom: Animalia
- Phylum: Chordata
- Class: Actinopterygii
- Order: Lophiiformes
- Family: Linophrynidae
- Genus: Linophryne
- Species: L. indica

Binomial name
- Linophryne indica (Brauer, 1902)

Synonyms
- Aceratias macrorhinus indicus Brauer, 1902; Linophryne corymbifera Regan & Trewavas, 1932

= Linophryne indica =

Linophryne indica Temporal range: Tortonian

Species of fish

Linophryne indica, or headlight angler, is a leftvent anglerfish in the family Linophrynidae, found in the bathyal zone of the Pacific Ocean at depths below 1,000 m (3,300 ft). The female is significantly larger than the mature male. A fossil specimen of this species has been found in the Los Angeles Basin dating back to the Late Miocene, some eight million years ago.

== Description ==
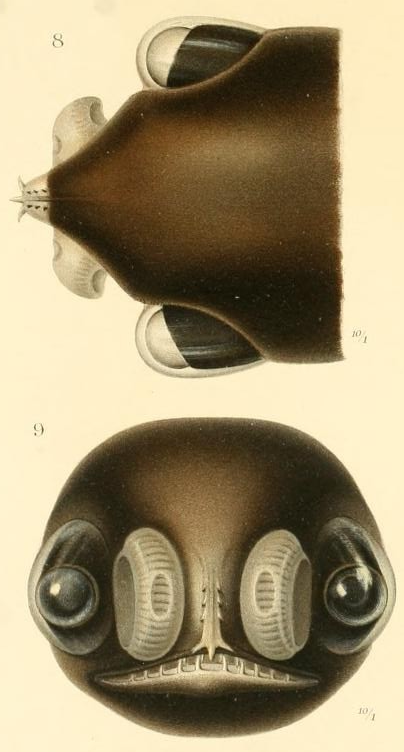
Dorsal and anterior view of the male's head.

The mature female Linophryne indica has a laterally compressed, oval body. The head is broad and the large, oblique mouth extends behind the eye. The teeth are large and sharp, there being four longitudinal rows in the upper jaw and three in the lower jaw, as well as a single pair of vomerine teeth in the roof of the mouth. The sphenotic spines (above the eyes) are large and there is a prominent angulare spine. The illicium on the snout is short and broadens into the rather larger esca at its tip. This has a number of short filaments and a long trailing appendage. There is a barbel on the chin with a single stem, branching into a bunch of short branches. The head and body colour is black, with the melanophores mostly arranged in two longitudinal bars, and the fins are colourless.

Females grow to a length of about 50 mm (2 in) while free-living males may achieve 18 mm (0.7 in). The males are similar to other members of the genus but can be distinguished from them by the pigmentation, with melanophores concentrated in two longitudinal bars, and by the lack of sphenotic spines (above the eyes).

== Distribution ==
Linophryne indica is native to the tropical and subtropical Indian and Pacific Oceans where is occurs in the mesopelagic and the bathypelagic zones at depths ranging from about 150 to 2,000 m (500 to 6,600 ft).

A fossil of L. indica and one of the closely related netdevil (Borophryne apogon) were found in Upper Miocene laminated deposits in the eastern sector of the Los Angeles Basin, California during construction of a metro line subway station in Los Angeles. The assemblage of anglerfish included several other extant species, leading the researchers to comment,

"Representatives of this suborder are almost completely absent in the sedimentary record preceding the upper portion of the Miocene, thereby implying that the age of divergence of the different ceratioid clades cannot be established with precision. However, the occurrence of extant genera of the families Oneirodidae and Linophrynidae documented herein clearly suggests that the cladogenesis of the various ceratioid groups occurred well before the Late Miocene."
