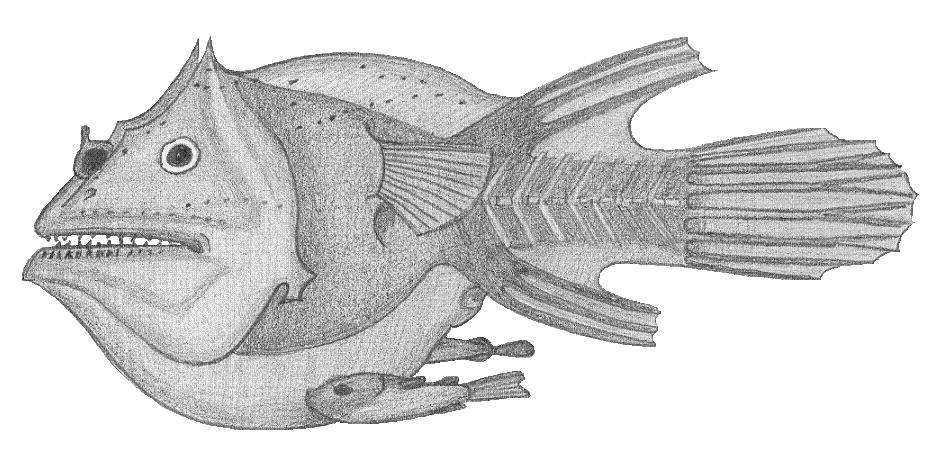
- Female ghostly seadevil with two attached males

Conservation status
- Least Concern (IUCN 3.1)

Scientific classification
- Kingdom: Animalia
- Phylum: Chordata
- Class: Actinopterygii
- Division: Teleostei
- Order: Lophiiformes
- Family: Linophrynidae
- Genus: Haplophryne; Regan, 1912
- Species: H. mollis

Binomial name
- Haplophryne mollis (Brauer, 1902)

Synonyms
- Aceratias mollis Brauer, 1902; Edriolychnus macracanthus Regan and Trewavas, 1932; Edriolychnus radians Regan and Trewavas, 1932; Edriolychnus roulei Regan and Trewavas, 1932; Edriolychnus schmidti Regan, 1925; Haplophryne triregium Whitley & Phillipps, 1939

= Haplophryne =

Genus of anglerfish

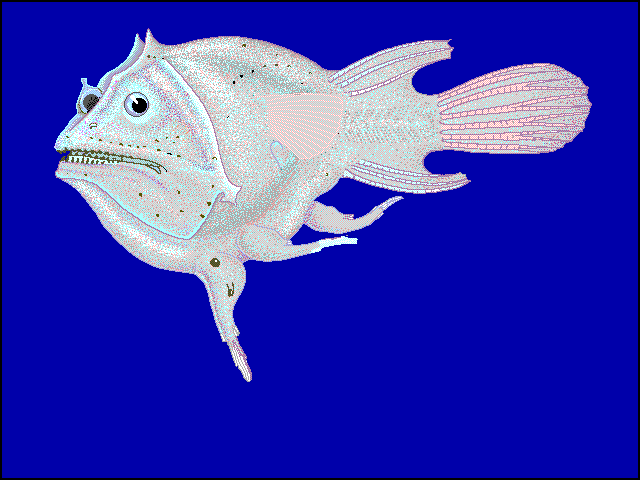
Haplophryne mollis female anglerfish with atrophied males attached

Haplophryne mollis, the ghostly seadevil or soft leftvent angler, is a species of anglerfish in the family Linophrynidae and is the only species in the genus Haplophryne. It is found in the bathypelagic and mesopelagic zones of tropical and subtropical parts of Earth's oceans at depths down to about 2,250 m (7,400 ft).

== Taxonomy ==
Haplophryne was first proposed as a monospecific genus in 1912 by the English ichthyologist Charles Tate Regan with Aceratias mollis as its only species and its type species by monotypy. A. mollis was first formally described in 1902 by the German zoologist August Brauer with its type locality given as the central Indian Ocean from a depth of 2,200 m (7,200 ft), collected on the Valdivia Expedition. The 5th edition of Fishes of the World classifies Haplophryne in the family Linophrynidae, within the suborder Ceratioidei, the deep sea anglerfishes, of the anglerfish order Lophiiformes.

== Etymology ==
Haplophryne is a combination of haplo and phryne. Haplo means "single"; Regan did not explain what this alluded to, but it may be to the holotype of A. mollis, a male which was "without nasal papillae". Phryne, which means "toad", is commonly used in the names of anglerfish genera. Its use may date as far back as Aristotle and Cicero, who referred to anglerfishes as "fishing-frogs" and "sea-frogs", respectively, possibly because of their resemblance to frogs and toads. The specific name, mollis, means "soft", an allusion to the thick, soft and unpigmented skin of the holotype.

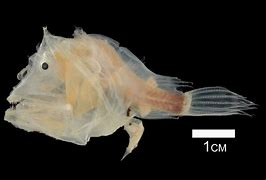
Haplophryne's size

== Description ==
Adult female Haplophryne mollis are much larger than adult males, with a maximum length of 16 cm (6.3 in), but 8 cm (3 in) is a more common length. The front dorsal fin is replaced by a lure (illicium or esca), consisting of a flap of skin that protrudes forward and over the mouth to attract prey. The fish has spine-like ornamentation above the eyes and at the corners of the jaws. Its head is large and angular, with a wide mouth armed with numerous small teeth in both jaws. The dorsal fin, which has no spines but consists of three soft rays, is set far back on the body; the anal fin also has three soft rays and the tail is rounded.

Unlike most other deepsea anglerfish, H. mollis lacks pigmentation, and both sexes appear pallid and translucent, with the musculature and portions of the skeleton being visible. Free-living males only grow to about 2 cm (0.8 in), and differ from the adult and juvenile females by having a short, bubble-like esca and small fins. Juvenile females lack the spinous ornamentation on the head.

== Distribution ==
Because of the great depths at which H. mollis lives, it is seldom encountered by humans. In 2009, it was reported that 88 known female specimens had been observed. The type specimen was described by the German zoologist August Brauer in 1902 from the Indian Ocean. Another Indian Ocean specimen was a free-living male caught off Western Australia. Other specimens have been trawled from the Atlantic Ocean, the Caribbean Sea and the Gulf of Mexico, between 55°N and 40°S. Further specimens have been found in the Pacific Ocean off eastern Australia, New Caledonia, and New Zealand, with isolated findings near Hawaii and in the Gulf of Panama. It is found in the bathypelagic and mesopelagic zones of tropical and subtropical parts of the world's oceans at depths down to about 2,250 m (7,400 ft).

== Life cycle and ecology ==
Male H. mollis are at first free-living, but when they have found a female, they latch onto her with their teeth. In most anglerfish the point of attachment for the male is on the belly, close to the anus, but in H. mollis the attachment site can be anywhere on the head or body, and in one case, a male attached to the female's esca (lure). The males orient themselves in random directions, and there may be more than one male per female. A papilla, or conical fleshy protuberance, grows at the site of attachment which may assist the male to establish a good grip. The mouth of the male is partially blocked by the papilla, but an opening usually remains at either side which suffices for allowing a flow of water over the gills. As time passes, the male becomes fused to the female and their tissues combine. The male can be considered as a parasite of the female but only about 30% of mature females encountered have an attached male, so many females may never encounter a mate and remain in a solitary, non-reproductive state for the duration of their lives.
