= Fish reproduction =

Reproductive physiology of fishes

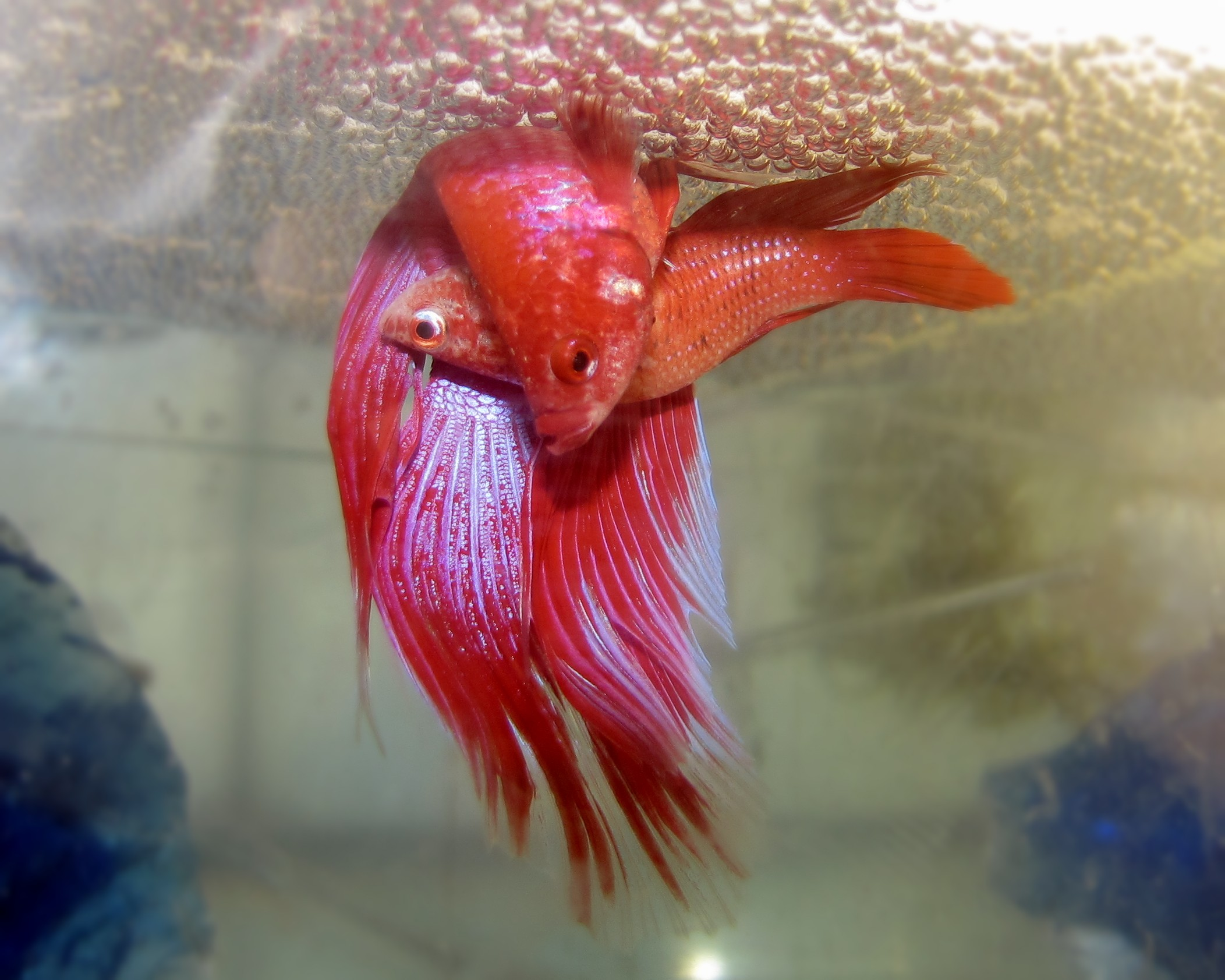
A pair of bettas spawning under a bubble nest.

Fish reproductive organs include testes and ovaries. In most species, gonads are paired organs of similar size, which can be partially or totally fused. There may also be a range of secondary organs that increase reproductive fitness. The genital papilla is a small, fleshy tube behind the anus in some fishes, from which the sperm or eggs are released; the sex of a fish can often be determined by the shape of its papilla.

== Anatomy ==
=== Testes ===
Most male fish have two testes of similar size. In the case of sharks, the testis on the right side is usually larger. The primitive jawless fish have only a single testis, located in the midline of the body, although even this forms from the fusion of paired structures in the embryo.

Under a tough membranous shell, the tunica albuginea, the testis of some teleost fish, contains very fine coiled tubes called seminiferous tubules. The tubules are lined with a layer of cells (germ cells) that from puberty into old age, develop into sperm cells (also known as spermatozoa or male gametes). The developing sperm travel through the seminiferous tubules to the rete testis located in the mediastinum testis, to the efferent ducts, and then to the epididymis where newly created sperm cells mature (see spermatogenesis). The sperm move into the vas deferens, and are eventually expelled through the urethra and out of the urethral orifice through muscular contractions.

However, most fish do not possess seminiferous tubules. Instead, the sperm are produced in spherical structures called sperm ampullae. These are seasonal structures, releasing their contents during the breeding season, and then being reabsorbed by the body. Before the next breeding season, new sperm ampullae begin to form and ripen. The ampullae are otherwise essentially identical to the seminiferous tubules in higher vertebrates, including the same range of cell types.

In terms of spermatogonia distribution, the structure of teleosts testes has two types: in the most common, spermatogonia occur all along the seminiferous tubules, while in Atherinomorph fish they are confined to the distal portion of these structures. Fish can present cystic or semi-cystic spermatogenesis in relation to the release phase of germ cells in cysts to the seminiferous tubules lumen.

=== Ovaries ===
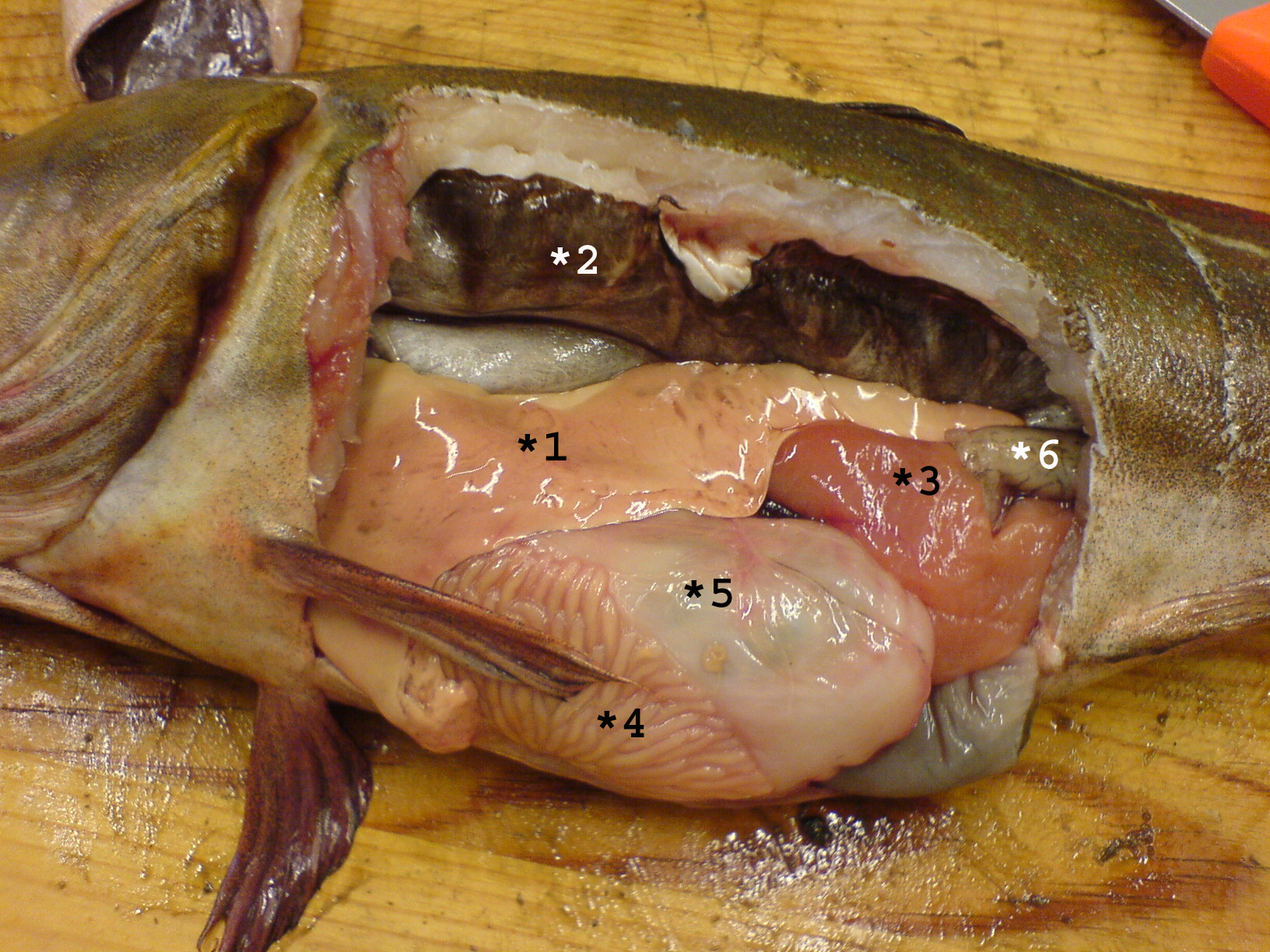
3. Ovary of a female Atlantic cod

Many of the features found in ovaries are common to all vertebrates, including the presence of follicular cells and tunica albuginea There may be hundreds or even millions of fertile eggs present in the ovary of a fish at any given time. Fresh eggs may be developing from the germinal epithelium throughout life. Corpora lutea are found only in mammals, and in some elasmobranch fish; in other species, the remnants of the follicle are quickly resorbed by the ovary. The ovary of teleosts is often contains a hollow, lymph-filled space which opens into the oviduct, and into which the eggs are shed. Most normal female fish have two ovaries. In some elasmobranchs, only the right ovary develops fully. In the primitive jawless fish, and some teleosts, there is only one ovary, formed by the fusion of the paired organs in the embryo.

Fish ovaries may be of three types: gymnovarian, secondary gymnovarian or cystovarian. In the first type, the oocytes are released directly into the coelomic cavity and then enter the ostium, then through the oviduct and are eliminated. Secondary gymnovarian ovaries shed ova into the coelom from which they go directly into the oviduct. In the third type, the oocytes are conveyed to the exterior through the oviduct. Gymnovaries are the primitive condition found in lungfish, sturgeon, and bowfin. Cystovaries characterize most teleosts, where the ovary lumen has continuity with the oviduct. Secondary gymnovaries are found in salmonids and a few other teleosts.

=== Eggs ===
The eggs of fish and amphibians are jellylike. Cartilagenous fish (sharks, skates, rays, chimaeras) eggs are fertilized internally and exhibit a wide variety of both internal and external embryonic development. Most fish species spawn eggs that are fertilized externally, typically with the male inseminating the eggs after the female lays them. These eggs do not have a shell and would dry out in the air. Even air-breathing amphibians lay their eggs in water, or in protective foam as with the Coast foam-nest treefrog, Chiromantis xerampelina.

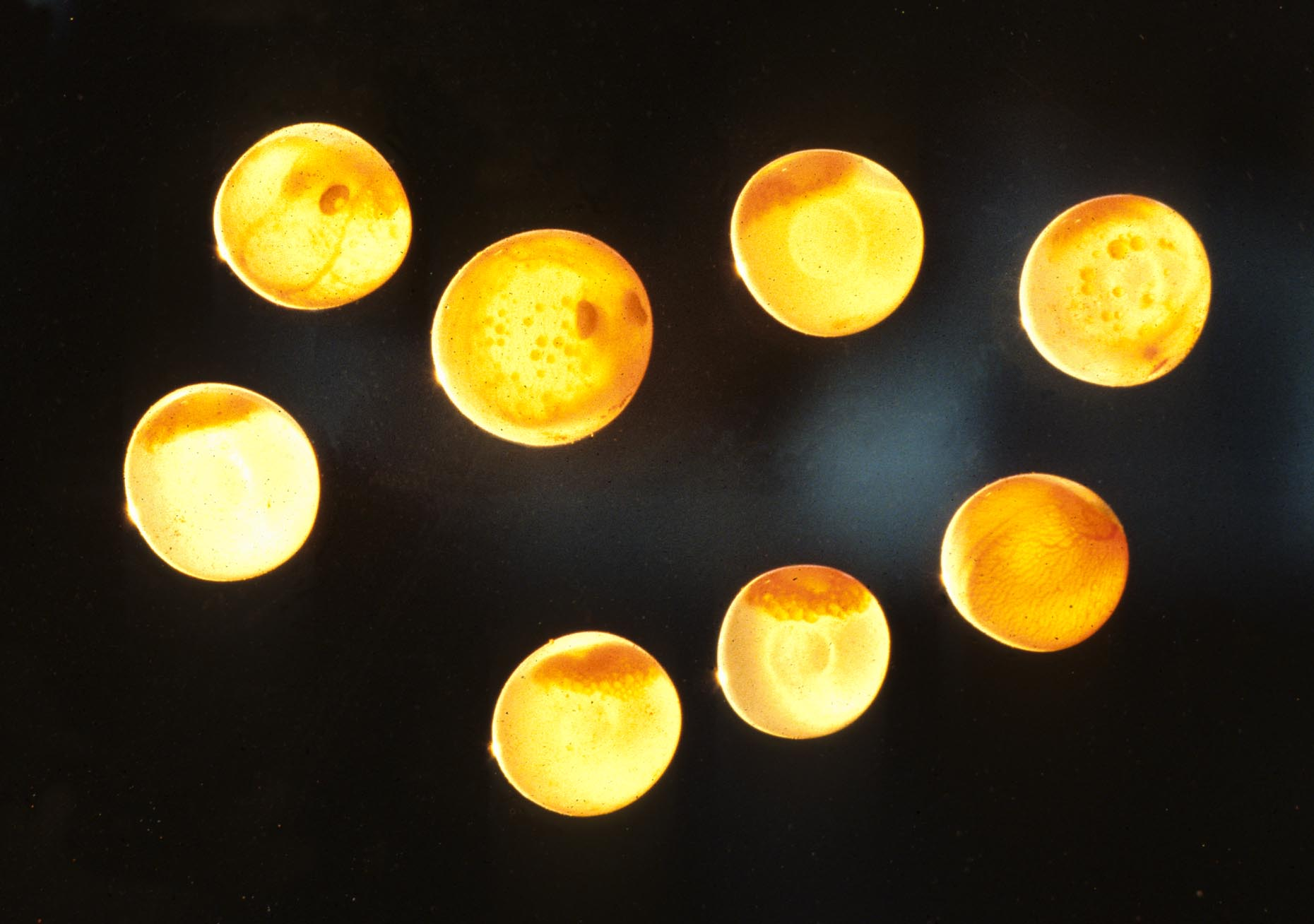
Salmon eggs in different stages of development. In some only a few cells grow on top of the yolk, in the lower right the blood vessels surround the yolk and in the upper left the black eyes are visible.

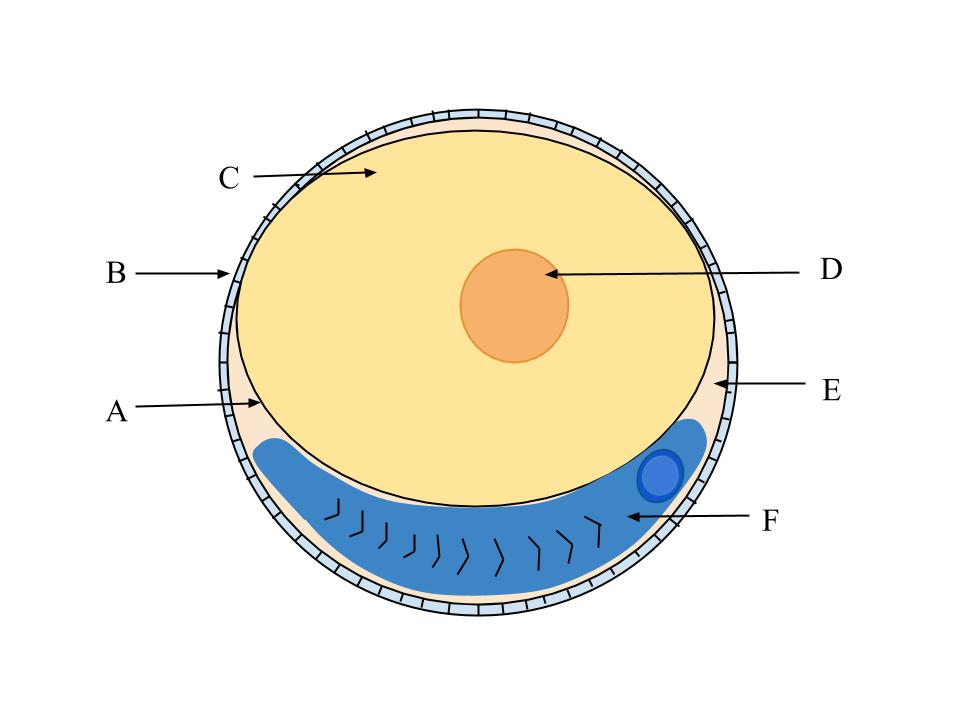
Diagram of a fish egg: A. vitelline membrane B. chorion C. yolk D. oil globule E. perivitelline space F. embryo

=== Intromittent organs ===
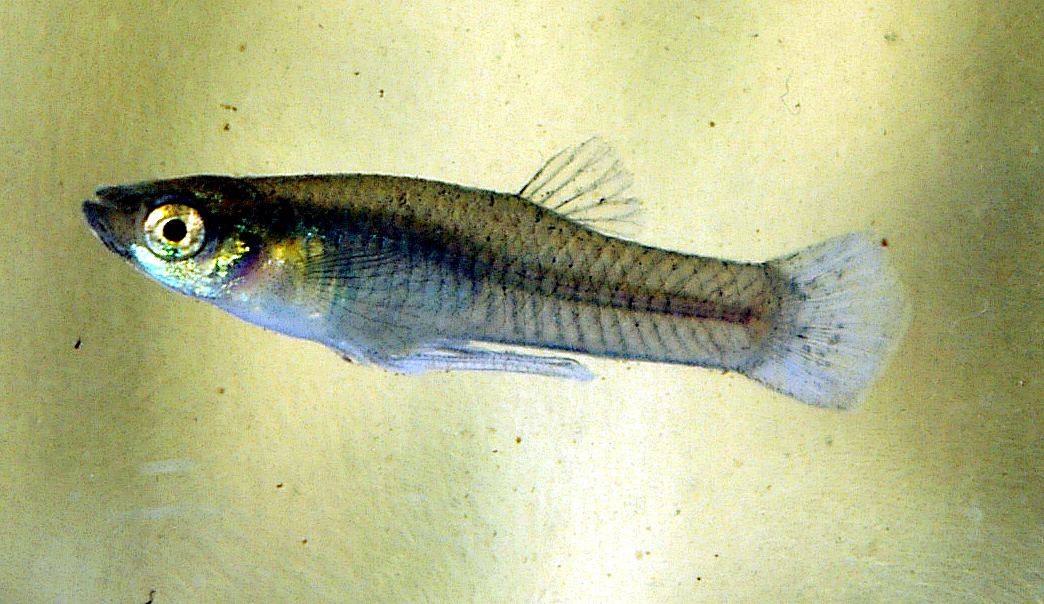
This male mosquitofish has a gonopodium, an anal fin which functions as an intromittent organ

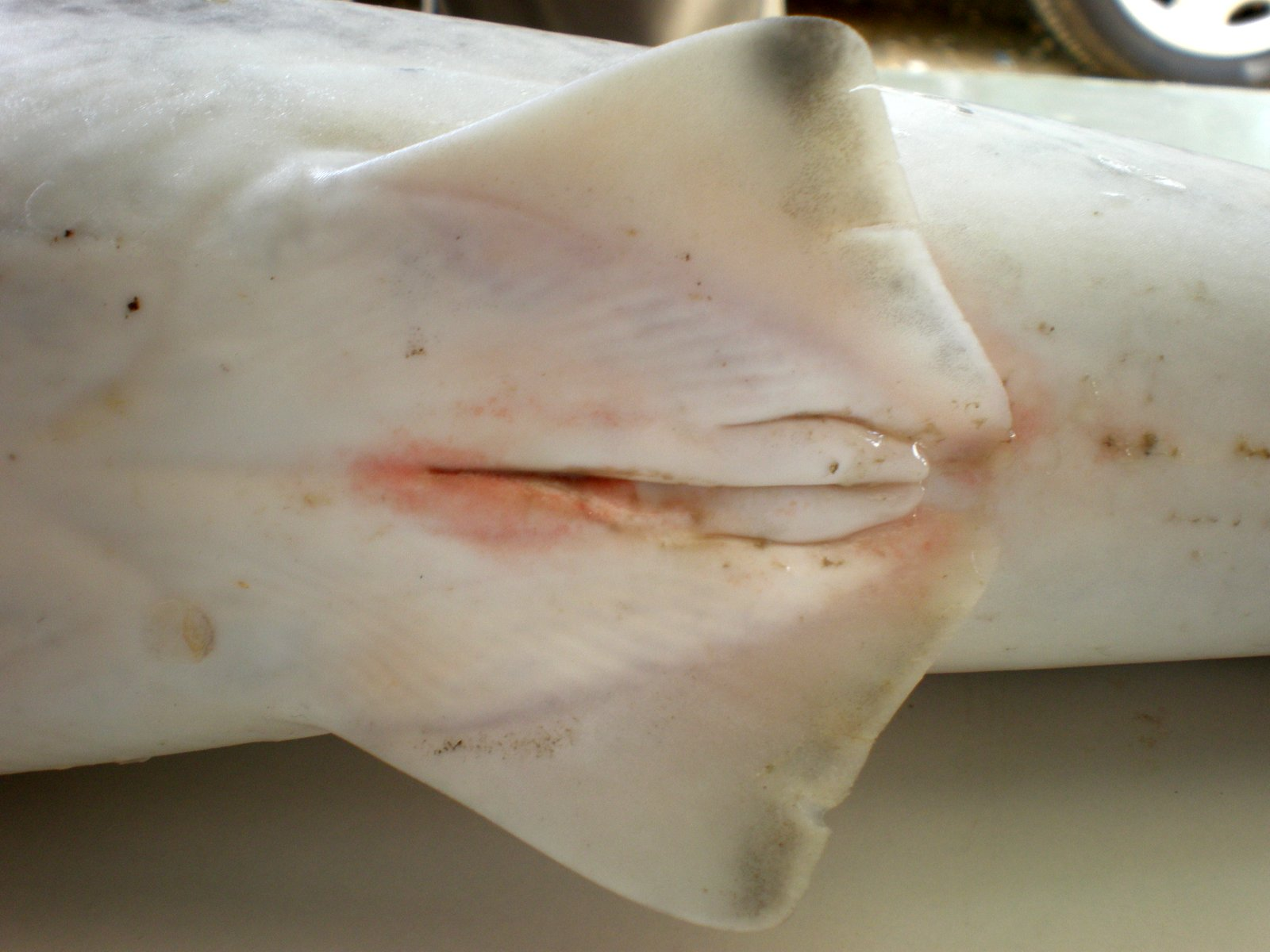
This young male spinner shark has claspers, a modification to the pelvic fins which also function as intromittent organs

Male cartilaginous fishes (sharks and rays), as well as the males of some live-bearing ray finned fishes, have fins that have been modified to function as intromittent organs, reproductive appendages which allow internal fertilization. In ray finned fish they are called gonopodiums or andropodiums, and in cartilaginous fish they are called claspers.

Gonopodia are found on the males of some species in the Anablepidae and Poeciliidae families. They are anal fins that have been modified to function as movable intromittent organs and are used to impregnate females with milt during mating. The third, fourth and fifth rays of the male's anal fin are formed into a tube-like structure in which the sperm of the fish is ejected. When ready for mating, the gonopodium becomes erect and points forward towards the female. The male shortly inserts the organ into the sex opening of the female, with hook-like adaptations that allow the fish to grip onto the female to ensure impregnation. If a female remains stationary and her partner contacts her vent with his gonopodium, she is fertilized. The sperm is preserved in the female's oviduct. This allows females to fertilize themselves at any time without further assistance from males. In some species, the gonopodium may be half the total body length. Occasionally the fin is too long to be used, as in the "lyretail" breeds of Xiphophorus helleri. Hormone treated females may develop gonopodia. These are useless for breeding.

Similar organs with similar characteristics are found in other fishes, for example the andropodium in the Hemirhamphodon or in the Goodeidae.

Claspers are found on the males of cartilaginous fishes. They are the posterior part of the pelvic fins that have also been modified to function as intromittent organs, and are used to channel semen into the female's cloaca during copulation. The act of mating in sharks usually includes raising one of the claspers to allow water into a siphon through a specific orifice. The clasper is then inserted into the cloaca, where it opens like an umbrella to anchor its position. The siphon then begins to contract expelling water and sperm.

== Physiology ==
Oogonia development in teleosts fish varies according to the group, and the determination of oogenesis dynamics allows the understanding of maturation and fertilisation processes. Changes in the nucleus, ooplasm, and the surrounding layers characterize the oocyte maturation process.

Postovulatory follicles are structures formed after oocyte release; they do not have endocrine function, present a wide irregular lumen, and are rapidly reabsorbed in a process involving the apoptosis of follicular cells. A degenerative process called follicular atresia reabsorbs vitellogenic oocytes not spawned. This process can also occur, but less frequently, in oocytes in other development stages.

Some fish are hermaphrodites, having both testes and ovaries either at different phases in their life cycle or, as in hamlets, have them simultaneously.

== Reproductive strategies ==
In fish, fertilisation of eggs can be either external or internal. In many species of fish, fins have been modified to allow internal fertilisation. Similarly, development of the embryo can be external or internal, although some species show a change between the two at various stages of embryo development. Thierry Lodé described reproductive strategies in terms of the development of the zygote and the interrelationship with the parents; there are five classifications – ovuliparity, oviparity, ovo-viviparity, histotrophic viviparity and hemotrophic viviparity.

=== Ovuliparity ===
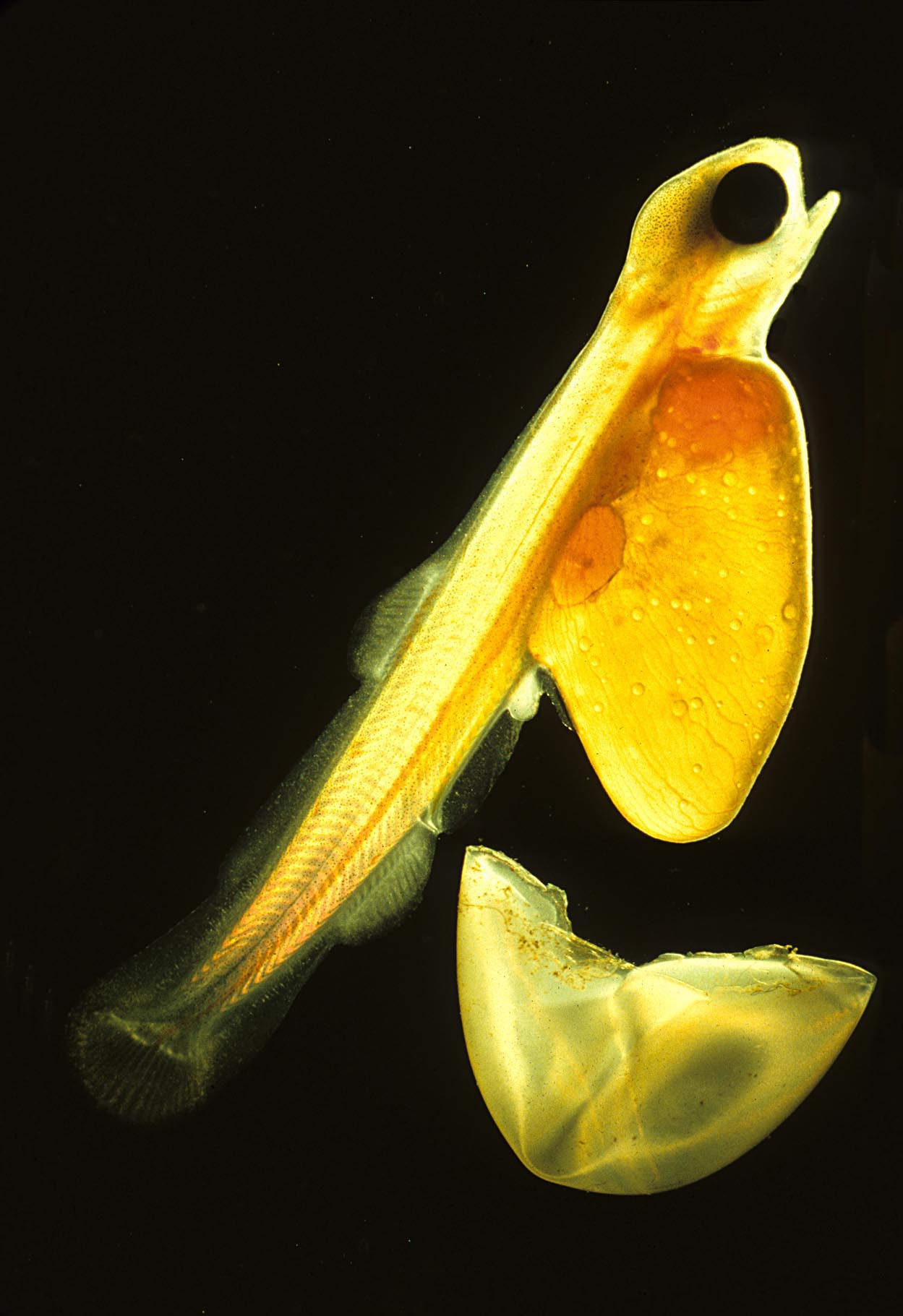
Salmon fry hatching. The larva has grown around the remnants of its yolk; the remains of the soft, transparent egg are discarded.

Ovuliparity means the female lays unfertilised eggs (ova), which must then be externally fertilised. Examples of ovuliparous fish include salmon, goldfish, cichlids, tuna and eels. In the majority of these species, fertilisation takes place outside the mother's body, with the male and female fish shedding their gametes into the surrounding water.

=== Oviparity ===
Oviparity is where fertilisation occurs internally and so the female sheds zygotes (or newly developing embryos) into the water, often with important outer tissues added. Over 97% of all known fish are oviparous (needs confirmation, since the ovuliparity is a new term which may be confused with oviparity. If ovuliparity is used, most of the fishes have ovuliparity breeding strategy). In oviparous fish, internal fertilisation requires the male to use some sort of intromittent organ to deliver sperm into the genital opening of the female. Examples include the oviparous sharks, such as the horn shark, and oviparous rays, such as skates. In these cases, the male is equipped with a pair of modified pelvic fins known as claspers.

Marine fish can produce high numbers of eggs which are often released into the open water column. The eggs have an average diameter of 1 millimetre (0.039 in). The eggs are generally surrounded by the extraembryonic membranes but do not develop a shell, hard or soft, around these membranes. Some fish have thick, leathery coats, especially if they must withstand physical force or desiccation. These types of eggs can also be very small and fragile.

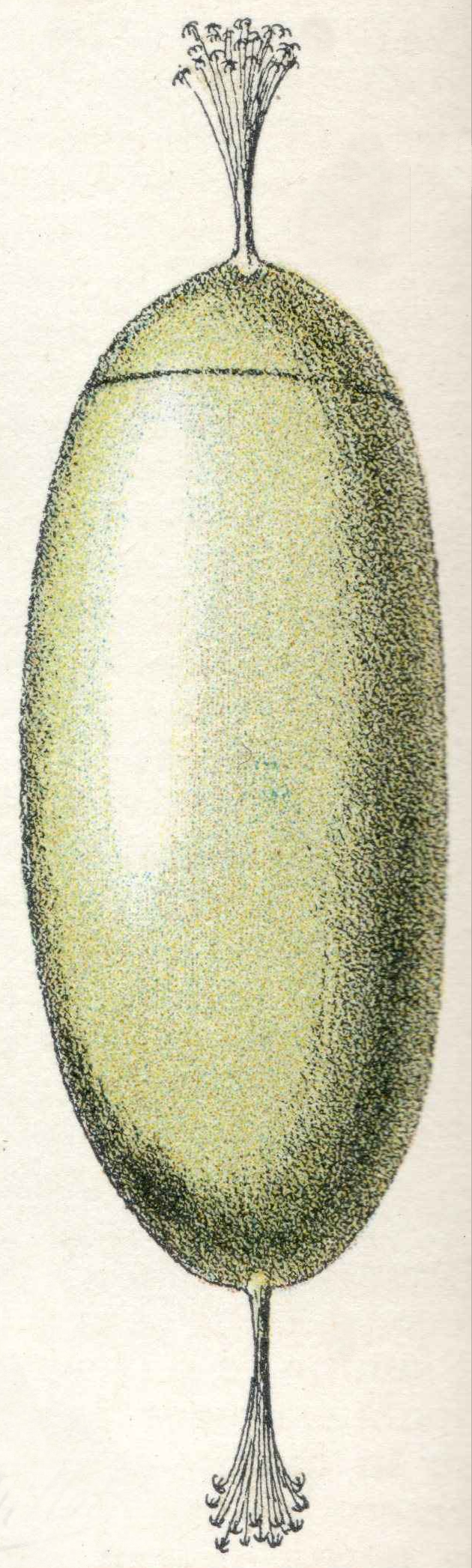
Egg of lamprey

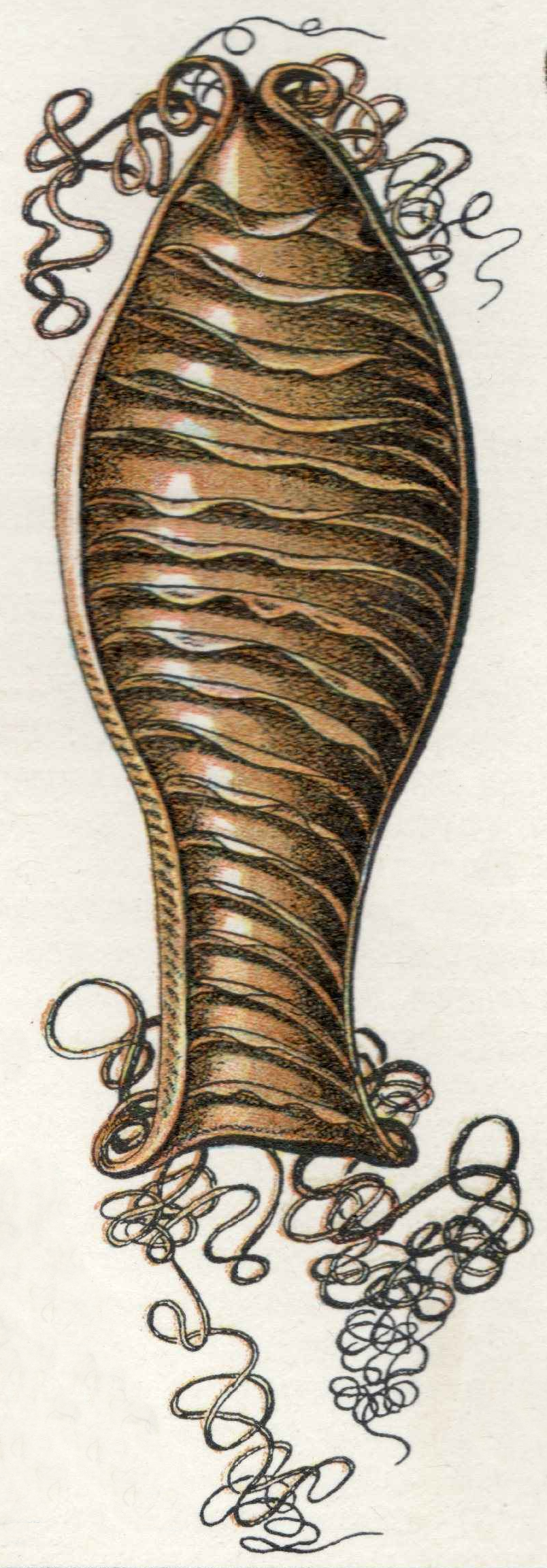
Egg of catshark (mermaids' purse)

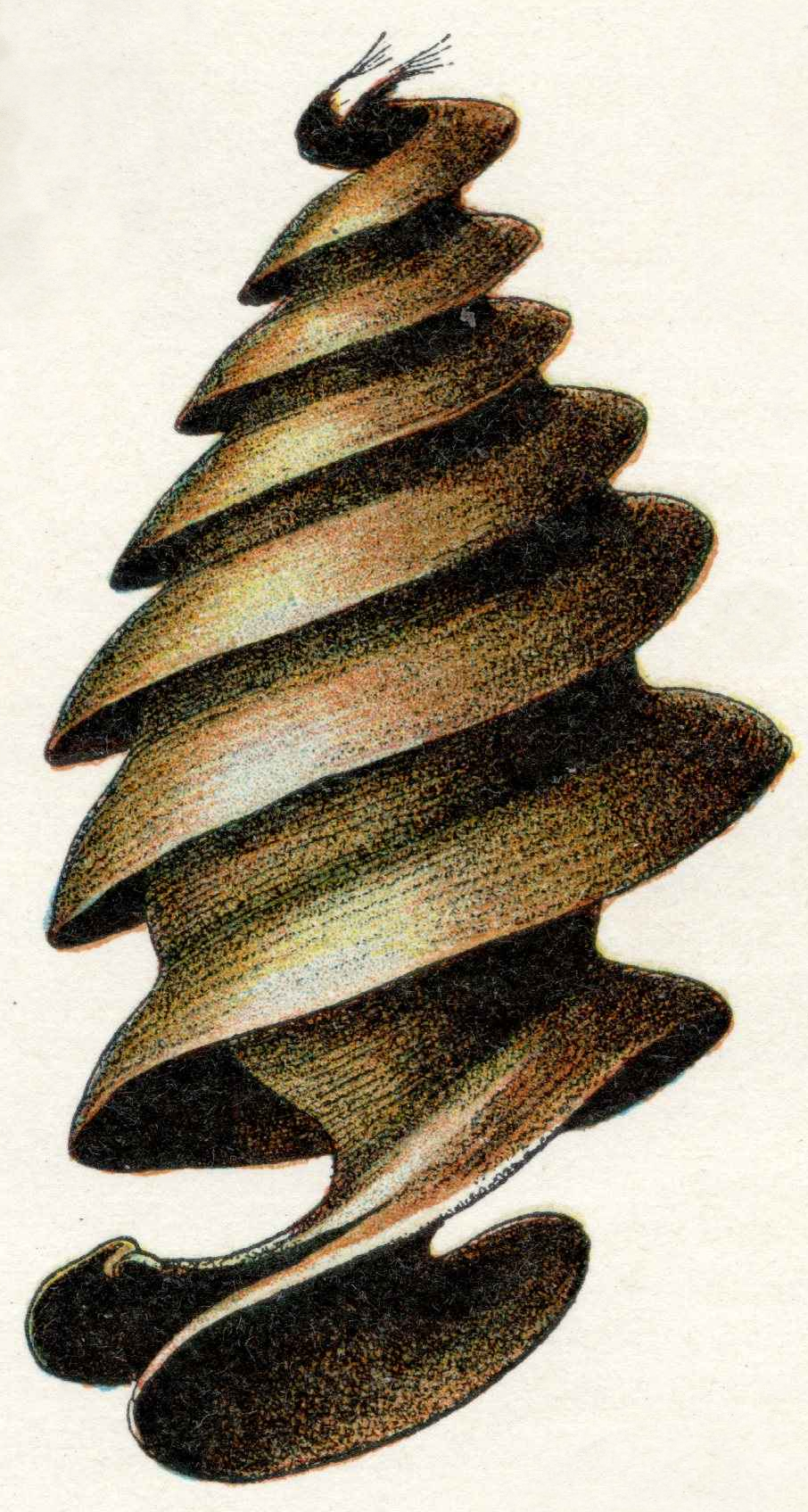
Egg of bullhead shark

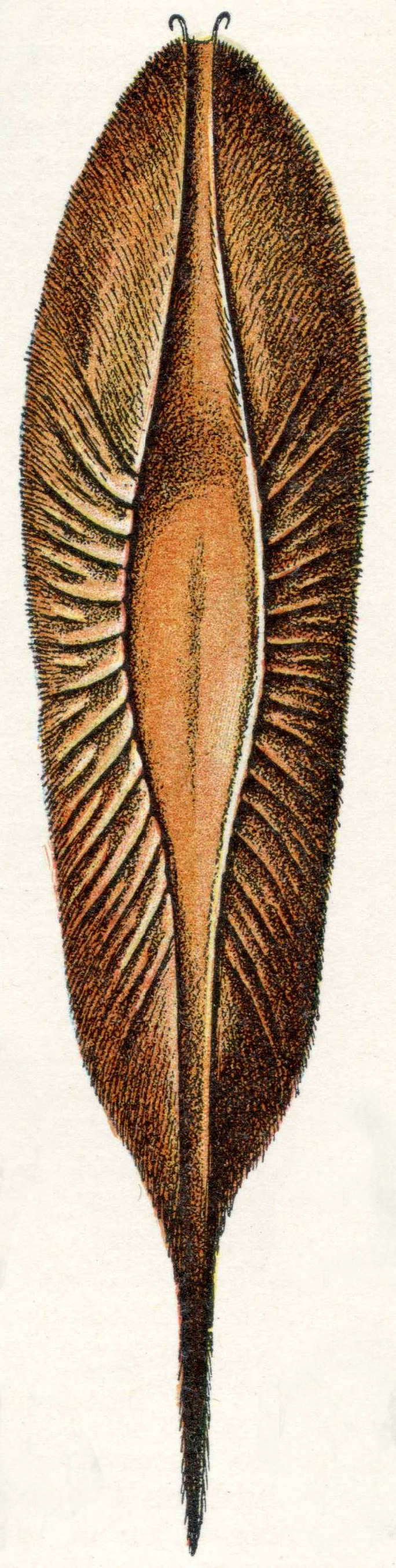
Egg of chimaera

The newly hatched young of oviparous fish are called larvae. They are usually poorly formed, carry a large yolk sac (for nourishment) and are very different in appearance from juvenile and adult specimens. The larval period in oviparous fish is relatively short (usually only several weeks), and larvae rapidly grow and change appearance and structure (a process termed metamorphosis) to become juveniles. During this transition larvae must switch from their yolk sac to feeding on zooplankton prey, a process which depends on typically inadequate zooplankton density, starving many larvae.

=== Ovoviviparity ===
In ovoviviparous fish the eggs develop inside the mother's body after internal fertilisation but receive little or no nourishment directly from the mother, depending instead on a food reserve inside the egg, the yolk. Each embryo develops in its own egg. Familiar examples of ovoviviparous fish include guppies, angel sharks, and coelacanths.

=== Viviparity ===
There are two types of viviparity, differentiated by how the offspring gain their nutrients.

- Histotrophic (tissue eating) viviparity means embryos develop in the female's oviducts but obtain nutrients by consuming other tissues, such as ova (oophagy) or zygotes. This has been observed primarily among sharks such as the shortfin mako and porbeagle, but is known for a few bony fish as well such as the halfbeak Nomorhamphus ebrardtii. An unusual mode of vivipary is adelphophagy or intrauterine cannibalism, in which the largest embryos eat weaker, smaller unborn siblings. This is most commonly found among sharks such as the grey nurse shark, but has also been reported for Nomorhamphus ebrardtii.
- Hemotrophic (blood eating) viviparity means embryos develop in the female's (or male's) oviduct and nutrients are provided directly by the parent, typically via a structure similar to, or analogous to the placenta seen in mammals. Examples of hemotrophic fish include the surfperches, splitfins, lemon shark, seahorses and pipefish.

Aquarists commonly refer to ovoviviparous and viviparous fish as livebearers.

=== Hermaphroditism ===
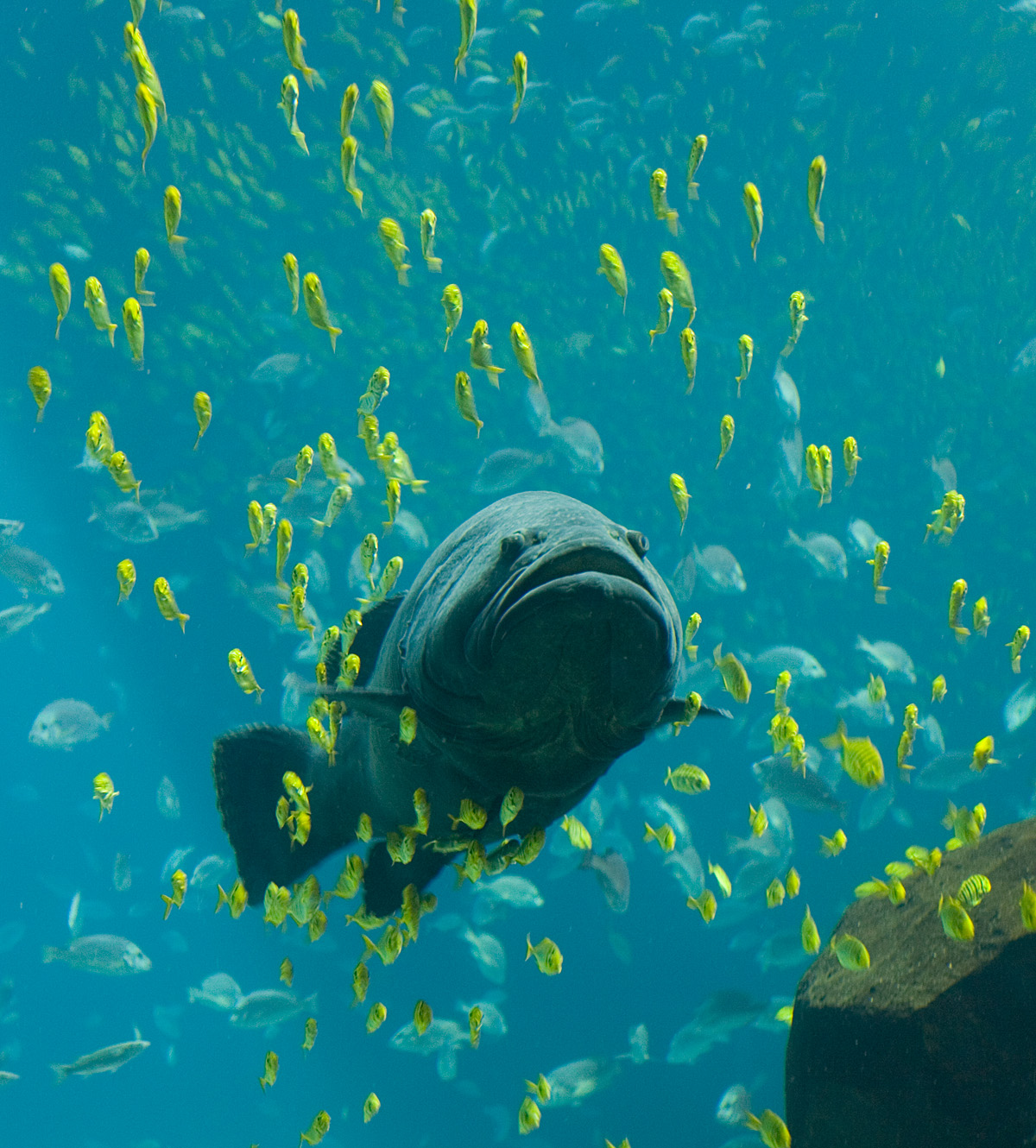
Female groupers change their sex to male if no male is available

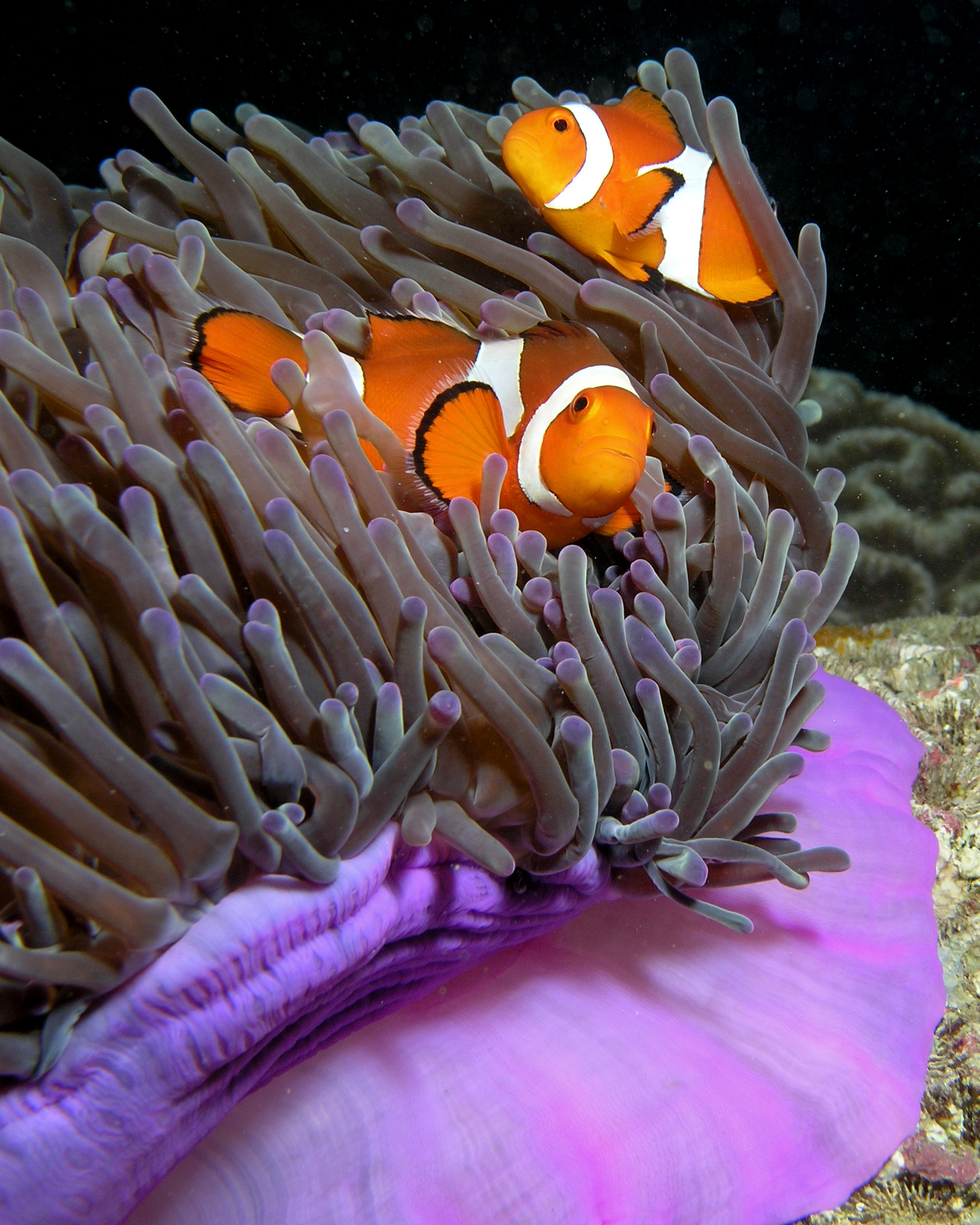
An anemone fish couple guarding their anemone. If the female dies, a juvenile male moves in, and the resident male changes sex.

Hermaphroditism occurs when a given individual in a species possesses both male and female reproductive organs, or can alternate between possessing first one, and then the other. Hermaphroditism is common in invertebrates but rare in vertebrates. It can be contrasted with gonochorism, where each individual in a species is either male or female, and remains that way throughout their lives. Most fish are gonochorists, but hermaphroditism is known to occur in 14 families of teleost fishes.

Usually hermaphrodite fish are sequential, meaning they can switch sex, usually from female to male (protogyny). For instance, if a dominant male is removed from a group of females the largest female in the harem can switch sex over a few days and replace the missing male. This is found amongst coral reef fishes such as groupers, parrotfishes and wrasses. It is less common for a male to switch to a female (protandry). As an example, most wrasses are protogynous hermaphrodites within a haremic mating system. Hermaphroditism allows for complex mating systems. Wrasses exhibit three different mating systems: polygynous, lek-like, and promiscuous mating systems. Group spawning and pair spawning occur within mating systems. The type of spawning that occurs depends on male body size. Labroids typically exhibit broadcast spawning, releasing high amounts of planktonic eggs, which are broadcast by tidal currents; adult wrasses have no interaction with offspring. Wrasse of a particular subgroup of the family Labridae, Labrini, do not exhibit broadcast spawning.

Less commonly hermaphrodites can be synchronous, meaning they simultaneously possess both ovaries and testicles and can function as either sex at any one time. Black hamlets "take turns releasing sperm and eggs during spawning. Because such egg trading is advantageous to both individuals, hamlets are typically monogamous for short periods of time–an unusual situation in fishes." The sex of many fishes is not fixed, but can change with physical and social changes to the environment where the fish lives.

Particularly among fishes, hermaphroditism can pay off in situations where one sex is more likely to survive and reproduce, perhaps because it is larger. Anemone fishes are sequential hermaphrodites which are born as males, and become females only when they are mature. Anemone fishes live together monogamously in an anemone, protected by the anemone stings. The males do not have to compete with other males, and female anemone fish are typically larger. When a female dies a juvenile (male) anemone fish moves in, and "the resident male then turns into a female and reproductive advantages of the large female–small male combination continue". In other fishes sex changes are reversible. For example, if some gobies are separated into male- or female- only groups, some will switch sex.

==== Self-fertilization ====
The mangrove rivulus Kryptolebias marmoratus produces both eggs and sperm by meiosis and routinely reproduces by self-fertilization. Each individual hermaphrodite normally fertilizes itself when an egg and sperm that it has produced by an internal organ unite inside the fish's body. In nature, this mode of reproduction can yield highly homozygous lines composed of individuals so genetically uniform as to be, in effect, identical to one another. The capacity for selfing in these fishes has apparently persisted for at least several hundred thousand years.

Although inbreeding, especially in the extreme form of self-fertilization, is ordinarily regarded as detrimental because it leads to expression of deleterious recessive alleles, self-fertilization does provide the benefit of fertilization assurance (reproductive assurance) at each generation.

=== Sexual parasitism ===
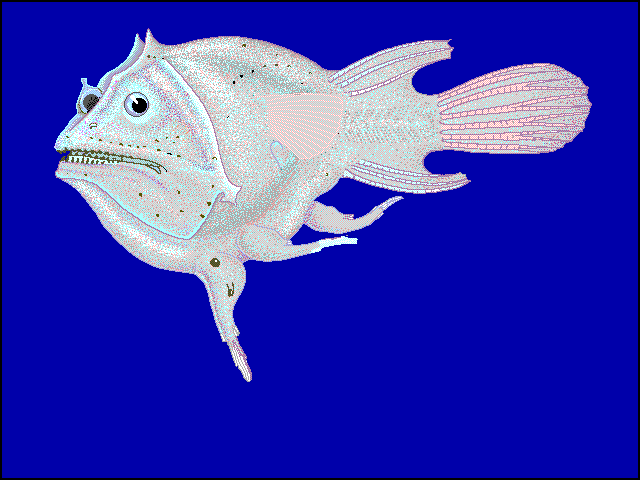
Female anglerfish, Haplophryne mollis, with atrophied males attached

Sexual parasitism is a mode of sexual reproduction, unique to deep-sea anglerfish, as they are faced with unique evolutionary pressures in the deep pelagic zones: individuals are very thinly distributed which makes encounters very rare, and unlike most pelagic fish, anglerfish are weak swimmers. Therefore, finding a mate is problematic, and drives the development of this behavior.

When scientists first started capturing deep-sea anglerfish, they observed that all the specimens collected were female; furthermore, many of them had what appeared to be parasites attached to them. It turned out that these "parasites" were highly reduced male ceratioid anglerfish; the males of all species of anglerfish are much smaller than the females, which facilitates the development of attachment onto the female's body, and in some cases fusion of their tissues (seen as natural parabiosis). This ensures that when either sex is ready to spawn, they have a reproductive partner immediately available. The males give nothing back except the sperm which the females need in order to produce the next generation, explaining why this behavior is termed "sexual parasitism".

Another form of reproduction referred to as sexual parasitism is hybridogenesis, where the reproductive effort of another species is exploited. One such example is seen in the genus Poeciliopsis. A population of these fish (dubbed Poeciliopsis monacha-occidentalis) consists only of females that mate with males from a closely related species, but only to stimulate the production of eggs; all the paternal DNA is discarded during the fertilization of eggs. The females get to pass their maternal genome to the next generation, unlike the males they mated with; this is called hemiclonal reproduction.

=== Parthenogenesis ===
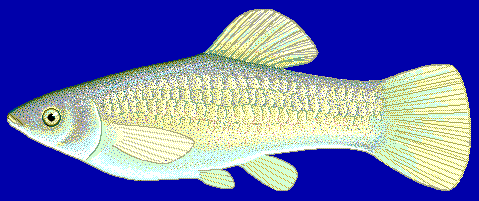
Parthenogenesis was first described among vertebrates in the Amazon molly

Parthenogenesis is a form of asexual reproduction in which growth and development of embryos occur without fertilization. In animals, parthenogenesis means development of an embryo from an unfertilized egg cell. The first all-female (unisexual) reproduction in vertebrates was described in the Amazon molly in 1932. Since then at least 50 species of unisexual vertebrate have been described, including at least 20 fish, 25 lizards, a single snake species, frogs, and salamanders. As with all types of asexual reproduction, there are both costs (low genetic diversity and therefore susceptibility to adverse mutations that might occur) and benefits (reproduction without the need for a male) associated with parthenogenesis.

Parthenogenesis in sharks has been confirmed in the bonnethead and zebra shark. Other, usually sexual species, may occasionally reproduce parthenogenetically, and the hammerhead and blacktip sharks are recent additions to the known list of facultative parthenogenetic vertebrates.

A special case of parthenogenesis is gynogenesis. In this type of reproduction, offspring are produced by the same mechanism as in parthenogenesis, however, the egg is stimulated to develop simply by the presence of sperm - the sperm cells do not contribute any genetic material to the offspring. Because gynogenetic species are all female, activation of their eggs requires mating with males of a closely related species for the needed stimulus. The Amazon molly, (pictured), reproduces by gynogenesis.

=== Others ===
The elkhorn sculpin (Alcichthys elongatus) is a marine teleost with a unique reproductive mode called “internal gametic association”. Sperm are introduced into the ovary by copulation and then enter the micropylar canal of ovulated eggs in the ovarian cavity. However, actual sperm-egg fusion does not occur until the eggs have been released into sea water.

== Inbreeding ==
=== Inbreeding depression ===
The effect of inbreeding on reproductive behavior was studied in the poeciliid fish Heterandria formosa. One generation of full-sib mating was found to decrease reproductive performance and likely reproductive success of male progeny. Other traits that displayed inbreeding depression were offspring viability and maturation time of both males and females.

Exposure of zebra fish to a chemical environmental agent, analogous to that caused by anthropogenic pollution, amplified the effects of inbreeding on key reproductive traits. Embryo viability was significantly reduced in inbred exposed fish and there was a tendency for inbred males to sire fewer offspring.

The behaviors of juvenile Coho salmon with either low or medium inbreeding were compared in paired contests. Fish with low inbreeding showed almost twice the aggressive pursuit in defending territory than fish with medium inbreeding, and furthermore had a higher specific growth rate. A significant effect of inbreeding depression on juvenile survival was also found, but only in high-density competitive environments, suggesting that intra-specific competition can magnify the deleterious effects of inbreeding.

=== Inbreeding avoidance ===
Inbreeding ordinarily has negative fitness consequences (inbreeding depression), and as a result species have evolved mechanisms to avoid inbreeding. Numerous inbreeding avoidance mechanisms operating prior to mating have been described. However, inbreeding avoidance mechanisms that operate subsequent to copulation are less well known. In guppies, a post-copulatory mechanism of inbreeding avoidance occurs based on competition between sperm of rival males for achieving fertilisation. In competitions between sperm from an unrelated male and from a full sibling male, a significant bias in paternity towards the unrelated male was observed.

Inbreeding depression is considered to be due largely to the expression of homozygous deleterious recessive mutations. Outcrossing between unrelated individuals results in the beneficial masking of deleterious recessive mutations in progeny.

== Examples ==
Female goldfish spawn (discharge) eggs into the water, encouraged by male goldfish who simultaneously discharge sperm which externally fertilizes the eggs

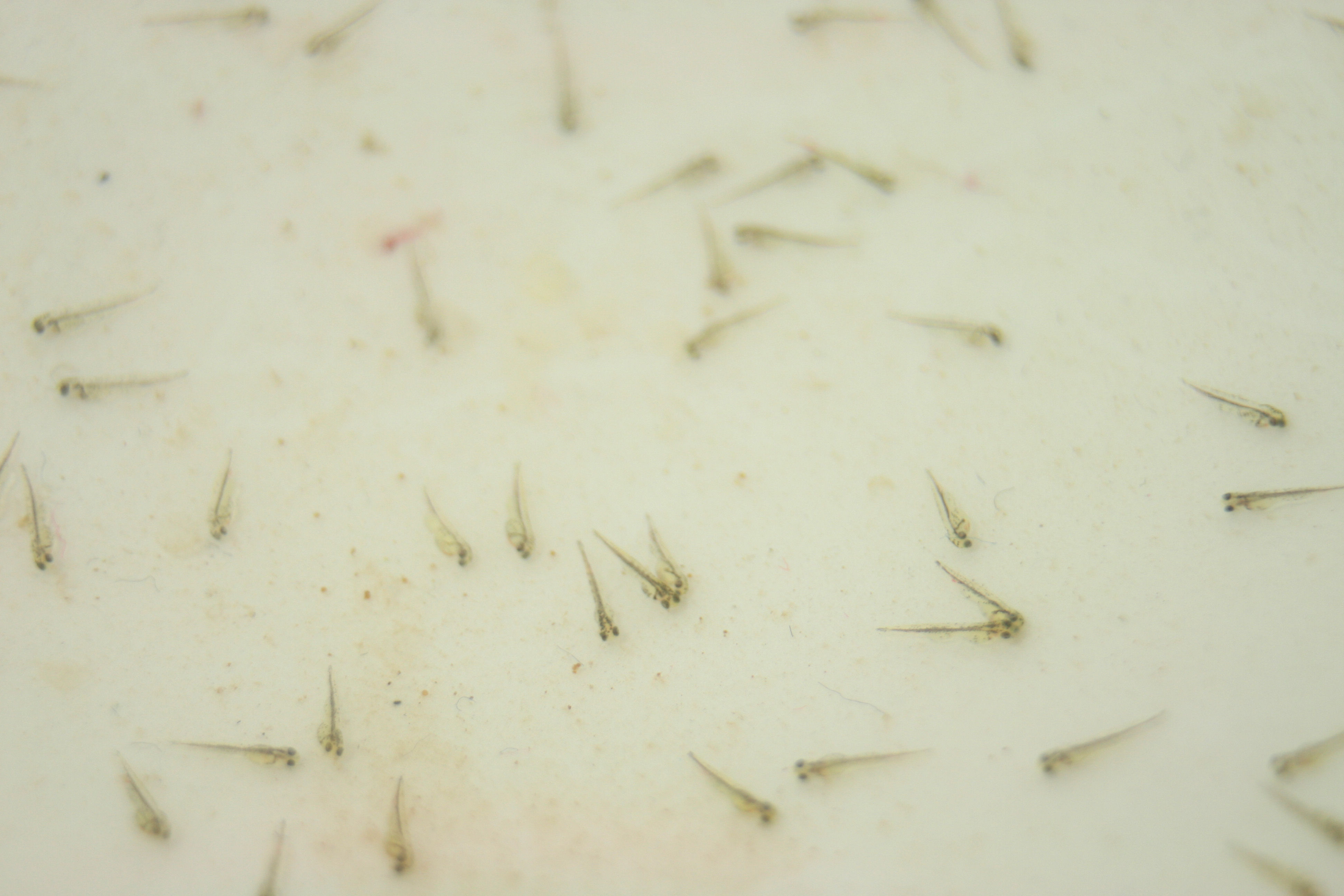
Within two or three days, the vulnerable goldfish eggs hatch into larvae, and rapidly develop into fry

Goldfish

Goldfish, like all cyprinids, are egg-layers. They usually start breeding after a significant temperature change, often in spring. Males chase females, prompting them to release their eggs by bumping and nudging them. As the female goldfish spawns her eggs, the male goldfish stays close behind fertilizing them. Their eggs are adhesive and attach to aquatic vegetation. The eggs hatch within 48 to 72 hours. Within a week or so, the fry begins to assume its final shape, although a year may pass before they develop a mature goldfish colour; until then they are a metallic brown like their wild ancestors. In their first weeks of life, the fry grow quickly—an adaptation born of the high risk of getting devoured by the adult goldfish.

Carp

A member of the Cyprinidae, carp spawn in times between April and August, largely dependent upon the climate and conditions they live in. Oxygen levels of the water, availability of food, size of each fish, age, number of times the fish has spawned before and water temperature are all factors known to effect when and how many eggs each carp will spawn at any one time.

Siamese fighting fish

Prior to spawning, male Siamese fighting fish build bubble nests at the surface of the water. When a male becomes interested in a female, he will flare his gills, twist his body, and spread his fins. The female darkens in colour and curves her body back and forth. The act of spawning takes place in a "nuptial embrace" where the male wraps his body around the female, each embrace resulting in the release of 10-40 eggs until the female is exhausted of eggs. The male, from his side, releases milt into the water and fertilization takes place externally. During and after spawning, the male uses his mouth to retrieve sinking eggs and deposit them in the bubble nest. Once the female has released all of her eggs, she is chased away from the male's territory, as it is likely that she'll eat the eggs due to hunger. The eggs remain in the male's care. He keeps them in the bubble nest, making sure none fall to the bottom and repairing the nest as needed. Incubation lasts for 24–36 hours, and the newly hatched larvae remain in the nest for the next 2–3 days, until their yolk sacs are fully absorbed. Afterwards the fry leave the nest and the free-swimming stage begins.

== See also ==
- Evolution of sexual reproduction

== Further references ==
- Agarwal NK (2008) Fish Reproduction APH Publishing. ISBN 9788131303573.
- Babin PJ, Cerdà J and Lubzens E (Eds) (2007) The Fish Oocyte: From Basic Studies to Biotechnological Applications Springer. ISBN 9781402062339.
- Bone Q and Moore R (2008) Biology of Fishes Chapter 8: Reproduction and Life Histories, pp. 217–255. Taylor & Francis. ISBN 9781134186310.
- Cabrita E, Robles V and Paz Herraez P (Eds) (2008) Methods in Reproductive Aquaculture: Marine and Freshwater Species CRC Press. ISBN 9780849380549.
- Cole, Kathleen Sabina (Ed) (2010) Reproduction and Sexuality in Marine Fishes: Patterns and Processes University of California Press. ISBN 9780520264335.
- Hoar WS, Randall DJ and Donaldson EM (Eds) (1983) Fish Physiology: Volume 9: Reproduction Part A: Endocrine tissues and hormones. Academic Press. ISBN 9780080585291.
- Hoar WS, Randall DJ and Donaldson EM (Eds) (1983) Fish Physiology: Volume 9: Reproduction Part B: Behavior and fertility control. Academic Press. ISBN 9780080585307.
- Jakobsen T, Fogarty MJ, Megrey BA and Moksness E (Eds) (2009) Fish Reproductive Biology: Implications for Assessment and Management John Wiley & Sons. ISBN 9781444312126.
- Melamed P and Sherwood N (Eds) (2005) Hormones and Their Receptors in Fish Reproduction World Scientific. ISBN 9789812569189.
- Potts GW, Wootton RJ and Wootton RJ (Eds) (1984) Fish reproduction: strategies and tactics Academic Press. ISBN 9780125636605.
- Rocha MJ, Arukwe A and Kapoor BG (Eds) (2008) Fish Reproduction CRC Press. ISBN 9781578083312.
