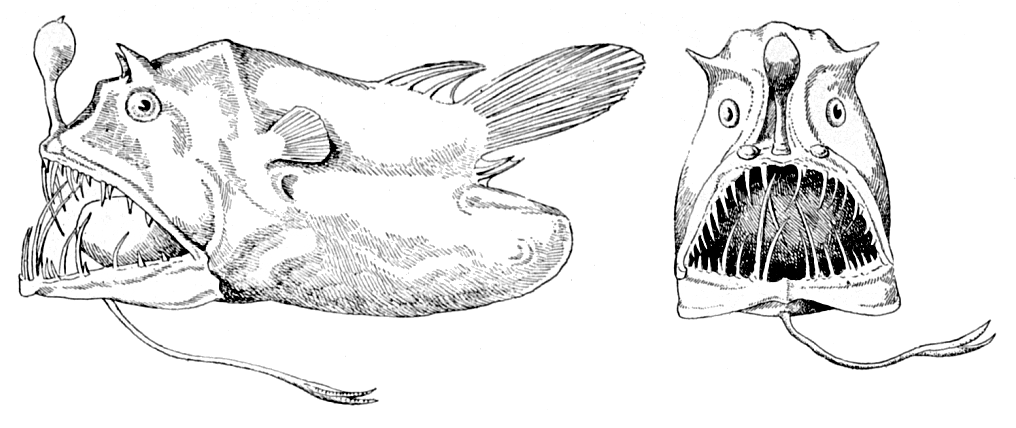
- Linophryne lucifer

Scientific classification
- Kingdom: Animalia
- Phylum: Chordata
- Class: Actinopterygii
- Division: Teleostei
- Order: Lophiiformes
- Suborder: Ceratioidei
- Family: Linophrynidae; Regan, 1926

Genera
- see text

= Leftvent =

Leftvent Temporal range: Late Miocene to recent

Family of fishes

Leftvent seadevils comprise the family Linophrynidae, marine ray-finned fishes within the suborder Ceratioidei, the deep sea anglerfishes. These fishes are found in the Atlantic, Indian and Pacific Oceans.

== Taxonomy ==
The leftvent family, Linophrynidae, was first proposed in 1926 by the English ichthyologist Charles Tate Regan as a monotypic family when he was describing specimens of previously unknown species of ceratioid fishes collected from the North Atlantic, the Caribbean Sea and the Gulf of Panama from the Danish reaearch ship,Dana. The 5th edition of Fishes of the World classifies the Linophrynidae within the suborder Ceratioidei, the deep sea anglerfishes, within the order Lophiiformes, the anglerfishes. Within the Certioidei this family is generally regarded the most basal.

== Etymology ==
The leftvent family, Linophrynidae, is named for its type genus, Linophryne. This name prefixes linos, which means "net", an allusion Robert Collett did not explain when he proposed the genus, with phryne, meaning "toad". The prefix may be a reference to the sac like mouth hanging off the trunk, which in the holotype contained a lanternfish, like a fisherman's keep net. The second part phryne is commonly used in the names of anglerfish genera. Its use may date as far back as Aristotle and Cicero, who referred to anglerfishes as "fishing-frogs" and "sea-frogs," respectively, possibly because of their resemblance to frogs and toads.

== Description ==
Lefvents are defined by the possession of three characteristics. These are the reduction in the number of soft rays in the median (unpaired) fins with the typical number in either fin being 3 but ranging from 2 to 4 rays, they have fewer branchiostegal arches which typically number 5 and the anus which opens to the left of the centreline of the fish (hence the name "leftvent").

The fishes in the Linophrynidae have varied morphologies but there are some other general characteristics. In metamorphosed females have short, rather globose bodies with large heads and a very large mouth. The jaws are almost equal in length, although some species have a protruding lower jaw, with a spine on the symphysis of the lower jaw. There are also well-developed spines on the sphenotic bone, while the articular and quadrate bone have no spines. The hyomandibular has a single head, this being a feature shared with the families Neoceratiidae and Gigantactinidae. The operculum is forked with a concave rear margin, the sub opercle is long and slender and has no spines on its forward margin while the preopercle has at least one well developed spine. They have smooth, naked skin with no spinules in the skin and the teeth are very varied between genera.

The illicium has a very short pterygiophore, its front end is hidden within the skin of the head or protrudes just a little above the skin on the snout. There is no relict second cephalic spine. The illicium has a length which is variable between genera, from being almost completely encased in the skin to up to 70% of the standard length. The esca has a morphology which is also highly variable between the genera. Linophryne has a hyoid barbel that is bioluminescent. Metamorphosed females are typically dark brown to black, although the appendages of the esca, the parts of the bulb of the esca close to the tip and the hyoid barbel of Linophryne, and the fin rays have no pigmentation. Haplophryne is an exception in that it lacks pigmentation.

The metamorphosed males have very large, forward pointing, rather tubular eyes with diameters that are equivalent to between 6% and 9% of the standard length. The olfactory organs are also very large and the number of olfactory lamellae varies by genera. Some genera also have teeth in the jaws of males, others do not. They usually do not have spines on the sphenotic bone and no males have a hyoid barbel and the skin is naked with no spinules, in free living males pigment may or may not be present. The parasitic males have denticular teeth, while their eyes, and olfactory organs degenerate and they have very inflated bellies.

The largest published standard length of a metamorphosed female is 27.5 cm (10.8 in), that of a free-living male is 0.86 cm (0.34 in) and that of parasitic males is .073 to 3.0 cm (0.029 to 1.181 in).

== Genera ==
The leftvents are classified into the following genera:

- Linophryne Collett, 1886 (Bearded seadevils)
- Haplophryne Regan, 1912 (Ghostly seadevils)
- Borophryne Regan, 1925 (Greedy seadevils)
- Photocorynus Regan, 1925 (Spinyhead seadevils)
- Acentrophryne Regan, 1926 (Fangtooth seadevils)

=== Fossil record ===
A fossil of what may be Linophryne indica was found in Late Miocene strata of Los Angeles, California, along with a fossil of the related Borophryne apogon, during the construction of a metrorail in 1993.

At least two fossils of Acentrophryne longidens have been found in Late Miocene-aged limestone from Rosedale, California.

== Biology ==
Leftvents are solitary anglerfishes which are found in the meso- and bathypelagic. The metamorphosed females passively lure prey using the illicium and esca to attract them. The males use their highly developed sensory organs to locate females, using the denticles to bite onto the females. The males fuse to the females and become sexual parasites.

When he latches onto a female the male releases enzymes to dissolve the female's tissue in the vicinity of his mouth, resulting in the male and female becoming united anatomically. After the union, the male's eyes, fins, and internal organs are lost, although the testes are retained. Its circulatory system becomes fused with the female's, and from the point of union the male receives all its nutrients through the joined blood circulation. The male stays attached to the female for the rest of her life and fertilises her spawn many times. Some species may have more than one male sexual parasite. This strategy evolved to ensure that the spawn is fertilised in the sparsely populated habitat of these deepwater anglerfish.

In other vertebrates the host's immune system would reject such a sexual parasite but in the leftvents, and other sexually parasitic anglerfish, many of the genes involved in the rejection of pathogens and foreign tissue are missing.
