= Dolopichthys =

Scientific classification
- Kingdom: Animalia
- Phylum: Chordata
- Class: Actinopterygii
- Division: Teleostei
- Order: Lophiiformes
- Family: Oneirodidae
- Genus: Dolopichthys; Garman, 1899

Type species
- Dolopichthys allector Garman, 1899

Genus of fishes

Dolopichthys is a genus of marine ray-finned fish belonging to the family Oneirodidae, the dreamers, a family of deep sea anglerfishes. These predatory, deep-sea fishes are found in the tropical and subtropical oceans around the world.

== Taxonomy ==
Dolopichthys was first proposed as a monospecific genus in 1899 by the American zoologist Samuel Garman when he described D. allector. Garman gave the type locality of D. allector as the Gulf of Panama at 5°26'20"N, 86°55'W, Albatross station 3371 from a depth between 0 and 1,408 m (0 and 4,619 ft). The 5th edition of Fishes of the World classifies this genus in the family Oneirodidae in the suborder Ceratioidei of the anglerfish order Lophiiformes.

== Etymology ==
Dolopichthys is a combinations of dolops or dolopos, a word meaning "ambusher", with ichthys, the Greek word for "fish". This name is thought to be a reference to these fishes lying in wait on the sea bed and attracting prey with the esca, or lure.

== Species ==
There are currently seven recognized species in this genus:

- Dolopichthys allector Garman, 1899
- Dolopichthys danae Regan, 1926
- Dolopichthys dinema Pietsch, 1972
- Dolopichthys jubatus Regan & Trewavas, 1932
- Dolopichthys karsteni Leipertz & Pietsch, 1987
- Dolopichthys longicornis A. E. Parr, 1927
- Dolopichthys pullatus Regan & Trewavas, 1932 (Lobed dreamer)

== Characteristics ==
Dolopichthys is, like other deep-sea anglerfishes, sexually dimorphic. The metamotphosed females are distinguished from thos of Chaenophryne by the possession of spines on the sphenotic bone, a deep incision on the rear margin of the operculum, rod-like pelvic bones which may be expanded at its tip. Characteritics which distinguish them from the metamorphosed females of Oneirodes, Tyrannophryne, Phyllorhinichthys, Microlophichthys and Danaphryne include having almost stratigh dorsal edges to the frontal bones and a long, thin subopercle with a clearly oval ventral end. They differ from the metamorphosed females of Ctenochirichthys, Leptacanthichthys, Chirophryne and Puck in having a wide lobe to the pectoral fin which is shorter than the longest fin ray on the pectoral fin. The double head on the hyomandibular bone sepaartes this genus from Bertella and the caudal peduncle having a depth of less than 20% of the standard length distinguishes it from Dermatias. The illicium emerges from the snout between the frontal bones, separating this genus from Lophodolos. In comparison to Pentherichthysthere is a spine at the symphysis of the lower jaw and there is no internal pigmentation on the rays of the caudal fin. Spiniphryne differs from this genus by having naked skin or only having tiny, scattered dermal spinules, which can be seen only through a microscope in cleared and stained specimens. D. longicornis is the largest species in the genus with a maximum published standard length of 15.9 cm (6.3 in) while the smallest is apparently D. dinema with a maximum published standard length of 2.2 cm (0.87 in), although this is only known from two specimens. The males are non-parasitic with between 5 and 8 teeth in the upper denticular and between 8 and 10 in the lower denticular. The larvae, males and juvenile females have pigmented subdermal tissue on the caudal peduncle which is separated inro a dorsal, a lateral and a ventral groups. The largest male known had a length of 12.5 mm (0.49 in).

== Distribution and habitat ==
Dolopichthys anglerfishes are found in the temperate and tropical oceans around the world.
