= Microlophichthys microlophus =

Conservation status
- Least Concern (IUCN 3.1)

Scientific classification
- Kingdom: Animalia
- Phylum: Chordata
- Class: Actinopterygii
- Order: Lophiiformes
- Family: Oneirodidae
- Genus: Microlophichthys
- Species: M. microlophus

Binomial name
- Microlophichthys microlophus (Regan, 1925)

Synonyms
- Dolopichthys microlophus Regan, 1925

Species of fish

Microlophichthys microlophus, the short-rod anglerfish, is a species of marine ray-finned fish belonging to the family Oneirodidae, the dreamers, a family of deep sea anglerfishes. This anglerfish is found in the deeper waters of the tropical and temperate oceans around the world.

== Taxonomy ==
Microlophichthys microlophus Was first formally described as Dolopichthys microlophus in 1925 by the British Ichthyologist Charles Tate Regan with its type locality given as the Eastern Atlantic, about 95 km (59 mi) northeast of Santo Antão, Cape Verde at 17°55'N, 24°35'W from a depth of around 1,500 m (4,900 ft). in 1932 Regan and Ethelwynn Trewavas proposed a new subgenus of the genus Dolopichthys which they named Microlophichthys, for D. microlophus. In 1951 Erik Bertelsen proposed that Microlophichthys be treated as a valid genus, the status which is generally accepted. The 5th edition of Fishes of the World classifies this genus in the family Oneirodidae in the suborder Ceratioidei of the anglerfish order Lophiiformes.

== Etymology ==
Microlophichthys microlophus is the type species of the genus Microlophichthys the name of which is a combination of micro, meaning "small", lophus, meaning "tuft" and ichthys, the Greek word for "fish". The name is an allusion to the short illicium of this species, the length of the illicium being no greater than one eighth the length of the fish. The specific name, microlophus, also refers to the short illicium.

== Description ==
Microlophichthys microlophus is, like the other deep sea anglerfishes, sexually dimorphic. The metamorphosed females are characterised by having naked skin, without spinules. They further have spines on the sphenotic bone and the rear margin of the operculim is deeply incised. The pectoral fins have a lobe which is shorter than the longest rays of that fin and wide. There is a spine at the symphysis of the lower jaw and the dentary bones are convex at the lower margin of the symphyses. The fin rays in the caudal fin have no internal pigmentation, the black skin of the caudal peduncle extends past the caudal fin base. The short illicium emerges on the snout between the frontal bones, the escal bulb has a length which is greater than half of the length of the illicium and the mouth extends past the eye. The metamorphosed males share many of the characteristics of the metamorphosed females but they have no teeth in their jaws, the upper dentary bone has an undetermined number, some being fused, of denticles which are long and irregularly curved while the lower dentary bone has 8 low and robust denticle on a row with the outer denticle slightly offset. The maximum published total length is for a female of M. microlophus and was 11.8 cm (4.6 in), while males vary in total length between 6.8 and 17 mm (0.27 and 0.67 in).

== Distribution and habitat ==
Microlophichthys microlophus is found in the tropical and subtropical portions of the Atlantic, Indian and Pacific Oceans. Although it has been recorded as far north as the subarctic Atlantic Ocean off Greenland. These anglerfishes are bathypelagic and are found at depths between 800 and 2,000 m (2,600 and 6,600 ft).
