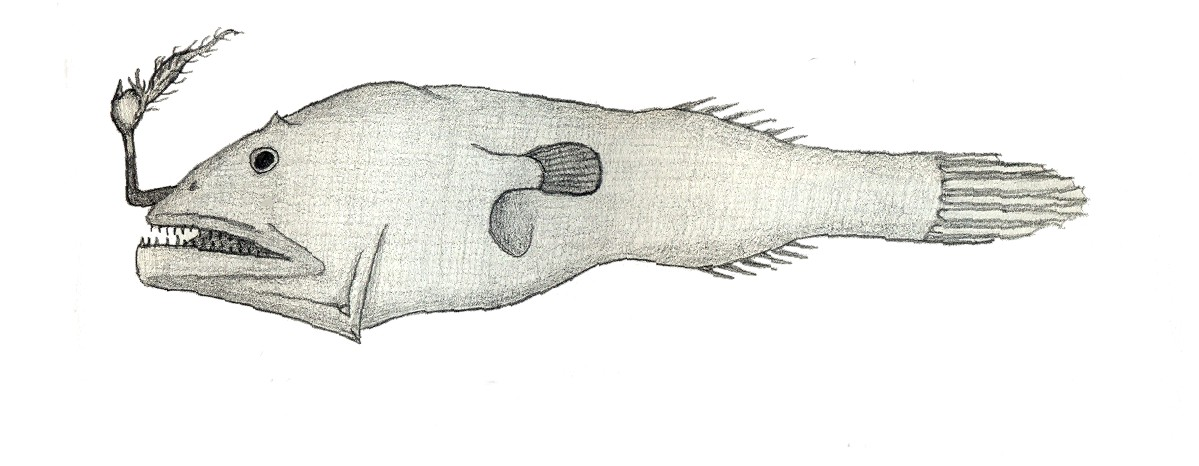

Conservation status
- Least Concern (IUCN 3.1)

Scientific classification
- Kingdom: Animalia
- Phylum: Chordata
- Class: Actinopterygii
- Order: Lophiiformes
- Family: Oneirodidae
- Genus: Pentherichthys; Regan & Trewavas, 1932
- Species: P. atratus

Binomial name
- Pentherichthys atratus Regan & Trewavas, 1932

Synonyms
- Dolopichthys atratus Regan & Trewavas, 1932; Dolopichthys venustus Regan & Trewavas, 1932; Pentherichthys venustus (Regan & Trewavas, 1932)

= Pentherichthys =

Monotypic genus of fish

Pentherichthys is a monospecific genus of marine ray-finned fish belonging to the family Oneirodidae, the dreamers, a family of deep-sea anglerfishes. The only species in the genus is Pentherichthys atratus which is found in the bathypelagic zones of the tropical and subtropical Atlantic, Indian and Pacific Oceans. The males of this species are dwarfed and are not parasitic on the females.

== Taxonomy ==
Pentherichthys was first proposed as a monotypic subgenus of Dolopichthys in 1932 by the British ichthyologists Charles Tate Regan and Ethelwynn Trewavas when the described Dolopichthys atratus as its only species. As Regan and Trewavas proposed the subgenus after 1930 they should have explicitly designated a type species in accordance with Article 13b of the International Code of Zoological Nomenclature, this was not done until Maurice Burton designated the type species in The Zoological Record in 1933. D. atratus had its type locality given as the Gulf of Panama at 6°48'N, 80°33'W, from a depth of around 1,250 m (4,100 ft). The 5th edition of Fishes of the World classifies this genus in the family Oneirodidae in the suborder Ceratioidei of the anglerfish order Lophiiformes.

== Etymology ==
Pentherichthys is a combination of penther, meaning "sad", with ichthys, the Greek for "fish". Regan and Trewavas did not explain this name but it may be an allusion to the black colour of this fish or to the black melanophores within the rays of the caudal fin. The specific name, atratus, means "clothed in black" and this allusion was also not explained by Regan and Trewavas but is thought to be the same as that of the genus name.

== Description ==
Pentherichthys is characterised by the large melanophores within the rays of the caudal fin. The metamorphosed females have the ethmoid region of the cranium being highly dorsoventrally compressed. They have a deep and broad illicium and a thin and elongated nasal foramina. There is no spine on the symphysis of the lower jaw. There are 6 or 7 soft rays on the dorsal fin and between 5 and 7 soft rays in the anal fin. The lobe of the pectoral fin is short and broad, the longest pectoral fin rays being longer than its lobe. The skin is naked, with no spinules in it and the darkly pigmented skin of the caudal peduncle reaches well past the base of the caudal fin. The metamorphosed males have posterior nostril joined to the eye, a white nasal area is white with 18 olfactory lamellae, there are between 7 and 9 upper denticular teeth which are fused at their bases and 4 lower denticular teeth. The esca has a small conical or laterally compressed forward papilla with a central crest on the tip and a large tapered rear appendage which has a number of short filaments and an enlarged forward-directed branch at each side of its base. The overall colour of the skin is black. The maximum published standard length of this species is 12.2 cm (4.8 in), with males having a maximum length of 1.4 cm (0.55 in).

== Distribution and habitat ==
Pentherichthys atratus has been recorded in the Atlantic, Pacific and Indian Oceans. It is a bathypelagic and mesopelagic species found at depths no greater than 1,400 m (4,600 ft).

== Biology ==
Pentherichthys atratus males are dwarfed in comparison to the females but are not sexual parasites. The biology of this species is almost unknown.
