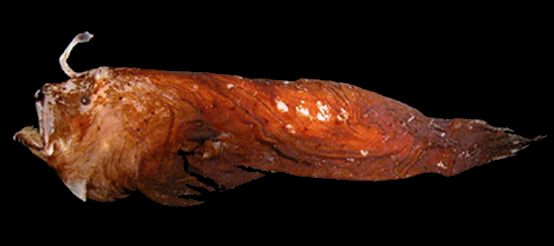

Scientific classification
- Domain: Eukaryota
- Kingdom: Animalia
- Phylum: Chordata
- Class: Actinopterygii
- Order: Lophiiformes
- Family: Oneirodidae
- Genus: Spiniphryne
- Species: S. duhameli

Binomial name
- Spiniphryne duhameli Pietsch & Z. H. Baldwin, 2006

= Spiniphryne duhameli =

Species of fish

Spiniphryne duhameli is a species of dreamer known from the central Pacific Ocean. The females of this species grow to a length of 11.7 centimetres (4.6 in) SL. The esca contains a pair of short, slender filaments at the tip, a small, simple appendage without distal filaments on the back, and three pairs of long, slender filaments on the sides. S. duhameli also has more dental teeth than S. gladisfenae.
