= P. pinnata =

P. pinnata may refer to:

- Paullinia pinnata, a flowering plant species found in Africa
- Pometia pinnata, a tree species widespread in south east Asia and the Pacific region
- Psoralea pinnata, a small tree species native of South Africa
- Puck pinnata, a fish species known only from the northwest Pacific
