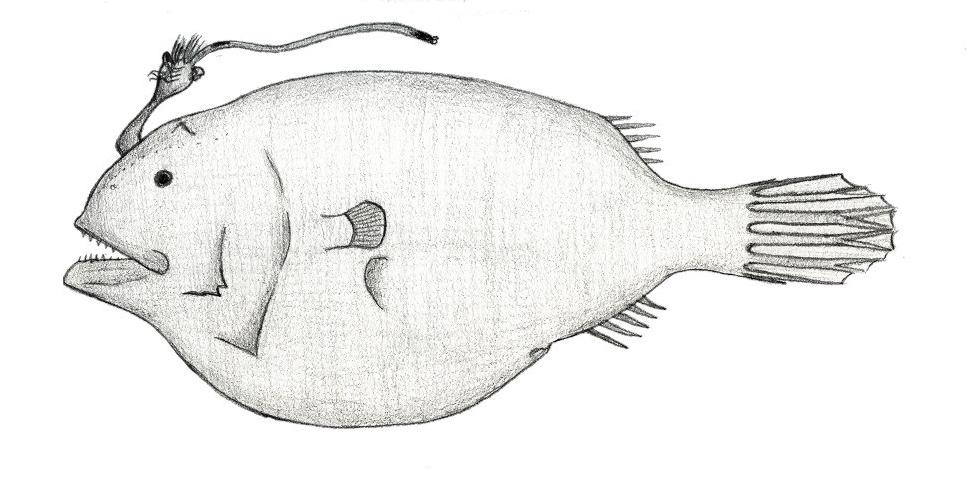

Scientific classification
- Domain: Eukaryota
- Kingdom: Animalia
- Phylum: Chordata
- Class: Actinopterygii
- Order: Lophiiformes
- Family: Oneirodidae
- Genus: Phyllorhinichthys
- Species: P. balushkini

Binomial name
- Phyllorhinichthys balushkini Pietsch, 2004

= Phyllorhinichthys balushkini =

Species of fish

Phyllorhinichthys balushkini is a species of dreamer found in the Atlantic Ocean. The females of this species grow to a length of 14.5 centimetres (5.7 in) SL. The illicium is longer than that of P. micractis. The esca bears a single forward appendage containing a pair of internal light-guiding tubes that diverge from each other at the tip. The rear escal appendage is extremely long, measuring over half the length of the fish, covered with dark skin and ending in a pair of translucent bulbs. The snout flaps are relatively small.
