= Bertella =

Conservation status
- Least Concern (IUCN 3.1)

Scientific classification
- Kingdom: Animalia
- Phylum: Chordata
- Class: Actinopterygii
- Order: Lophiiformes
- Family: Oneirodidae
- Genus: Bertella; Pietsch, 1973
- Species: B. idiomorpha

Binomial name
- Bertella idiomorpha Pietsch, 1973

Monotypic genus of fish

Bertella is a monospecific genus of marine ray-finned fish belonging to the family Oneirodidae, the dreamers, a family of deep sea anglerfishes. The only species in the genus is Bertella idiomorpha and this can be distinguished from other members of the family by the structure of its hyomandibular bone.

== Taxonomy ==
Bertella was first proposed as genus in 1973 by the American ichthyologist Theodore Wells Pietsch III when he described its only species, B. idioforma. The type locality of B. idiomorpha was given as off Guadalupe Island in Mexico at 29°10'00"N, 118°28'15"W from a depth of 0–940 m (0–3,084 ft) in waters where the seabed was at 2,377 to 3,475 m (7,799 to 11,401 ft) in depth. The 5th edition of Fishes of the World classifies this taxon in the family Oneirodidae in the suborder Ceratioidei of the anglerfish order Lophiiformes.

== Etymology ==
Bertella, the genus name, suffixes the affectionate diminutive ella onto Bert, this is in honour of the Danish ichthyologist Erik Bertelsen for his contributions to the study of ceratioid anglerfishes. The specific name, idiomorpha, combines idios, meaning "distinct" or "unusual", with morpha, meaning "form" or "shape", an allusion to the unique singular head of the hyomandibular bone.

== Description ==
Bertella', like other oneirodids, is a small, globular-bodied fish with a large head and jaws, and a bioluminescent lure (esca) on a stalk (illicium) attached to the head. The skin is scaleless and covers the base of the caudal fin. There are numerous small, rounded, darkly pigmented papillae on the head, body, and tail, associated with the lateral line system. The fish is dark brown to black in color, except for the clear tips of the papillae and the end of the esca. The jaws are filled with slender, straight teeth. The females measure up to 8.4 cm in length. Only one male is known, an 11-mm specimen attached to a 77-mm female. B. idiomorpha is unique amongst the oneirodids in having a hyomandibular bone (the bone that attaches the lower jaw to the cranium) with a single head. In its family, B. idiomorpha most resembles the genus Dolopichthys, differing in having a wider and deeper skull, shorter and fewer jaw teeth, and in details of the mandibular spines and the esca.

== Distribution and habitat ==
Bertella specimens have only been collected in the northern Pacific Ocean, including off Japan, in the Bering Sea, and in the Gulf of California. The depths ranged from 580 m to 3475 m.

== Biology and ecology ==
Bertella, in contrast to the closely related Dolopichthys, which feeds on fish and squid, feeds on amphipods, krill, and small decapods. This difference in prey items is reflected in the body shape of B. idiomorpha, which is shorter and deeper, suggesting that it is a more sluggish swimmer than Dolopichthys. B. idiomorpha also has smaller and fewer teeth, and its single-headed hyomandibular bone reduces the strength of its bite, again consistent with preying on smaller, slower prey items.

B. idiomorpha and Leptacanthichthys gracilispinis are the only oneirodids known to have parasitic males. Both the tips of the upper and lower jaws of the male B. idiomorpha become fused to the female. Small openings to the mouth and opercular cavities of the male are maintained on both sides. Mature female B. idiomorpha contain around 7500 eggs per ovary, and have some of the largest eggs amongst the deep-sea anglerfish.
