= Spiniphryne gladisfenae =

Scientific classification
- Kingdom: Animalia
- Phylum: Chordata
- Class: Actinopterygii
- Order: Lophiiformes
- Family: Oneirodidae
- Genus: Spiniphryne
- Species: S. gladisfenae

Binomial name
- Spiniphryne gladisfenae (Beebe, 1932)

Species of fish

Spiniphryne gladisfenae, also known as the prickly dreamer, is a species of dreamer. Dreamers are a type of deep sea anglerfish known only from the Atlantic Ocean. Anglerfish are classified by how they lure their prey. Female anglerfish have a piece of dorsal spine that protrudes above their mouth and is luminescent in order to attract prey. The females of the species Spiniphryne gladisfenae can grow to a length of 10.5 centimetres (4.1 in) SL. The esca contains two bulbous appendages on the tip, covered with tiny papillae and with clusters of tiny filaments around the base. There is also a large appendage on the back, divided at the end into three lobes or many filaments. The number of lateral escal filaments varies from none to three. S. gladisfenae also has fewer dental teeth than S. duhameli.
