= Phyllorhinichthys micractis =

Scientific classification
- Domain: Eukaryota
- Kingdom: Animalia
- Phylum: Chordata
- Class: Actinopterygii
- Order: Lophiiformes
- Family: Oneirodidae
- Genus: Phyllorhinichthys
- Species: P. micractis

Binomial name
- Phyllorhinichthys micractis Pietsch, 1969

Species of fish

Phyllorhinichthys micractis is a species of dreamer that has been recorded from the Atlantic, Pacific and Indian Oceans. The females of this species grow to a length of 12 centimetres (4.7 in) SL. The illicium is shorter than that of P. balushkini. The esca has two forward appendages at the tip and the rear appendage is much shorter and stouter than that of P. balushkini. The available specimens vary in the number and presence of additional appendages and filaments. The size of the snout flaps are also highly variable.
