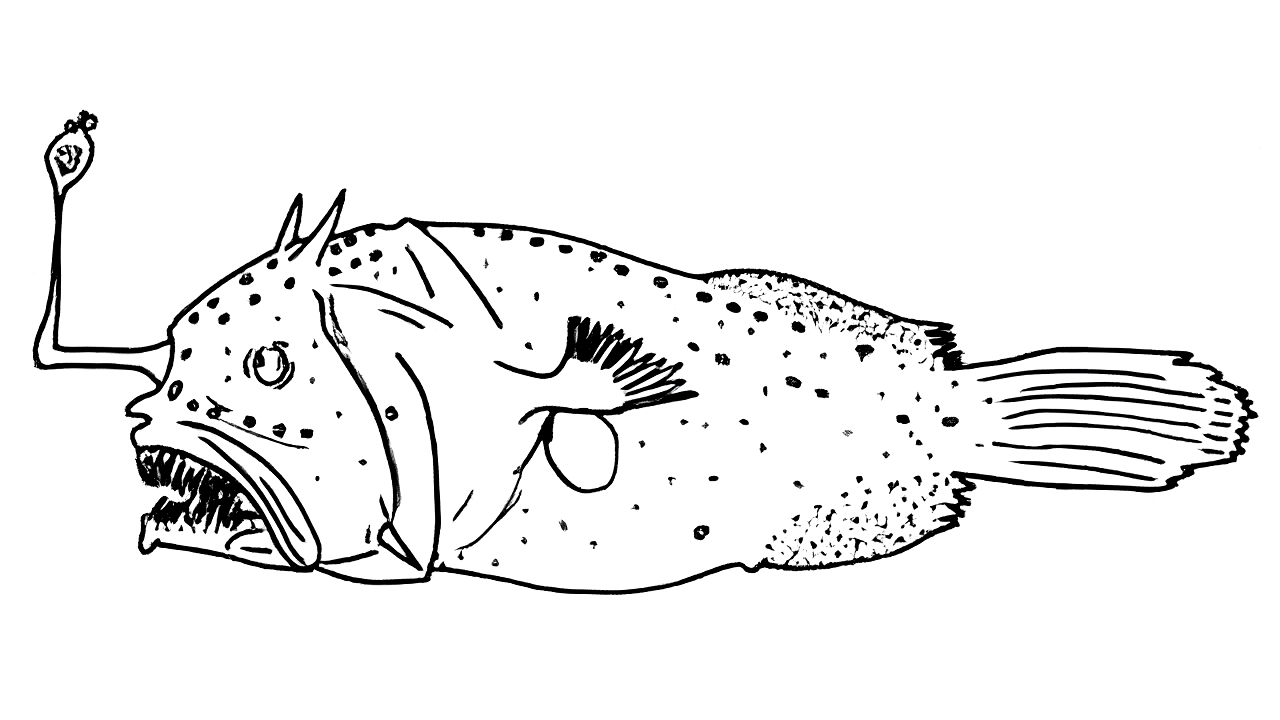

Conservation status
- Least Concern (IUCN 3.1)

Scientific classification
- Kingdom: Animalia
- Phylum: Chordata
- Class: Actinopterygii
- Order: Lophiiformes
- Family: Oneirodidae
- Genus: Puck; Pietsch, 1978
- Species: P. pinnata

Binomial name
- Puck pinnata Pietsch, 1978

= Puck pinnata =

Species of fish

Puck pinnata, the mischievous dreamer, is a species of marine ray-finned fish belonging to the family Oneirodidae, the dreamers, a family of deep-sea anglerfishes. This species is known from four metamorphosed female specimens each collected from four separate locations, three in the Pacific Ocean and one in the Atlantic Ocean. As with all other species in the family, it is a pelagic, deep-water fish that is a member of the abyssal ecosystem. It is the only known species in the monospecific genus Puck.

== Taxonomy ==
Puck pinnata was first formally described in 1978 by the American ichthyologist Theodore Wells Pietsch III with its type locality given as the Northwestern Pacific Ocean at 38°16'N, 152°34'E from a depth of 5,350 m (17,550 ft). Pietsch classified this new species in the new genus Puck. In his description Pietsch noted that this species appeared to be one of the more derived species in the family Oneirodidae having a long lobe to the pectoral fin, a feature shared with the genera Ctenochirichthys, Chirophryne and Leptacanthichthys, with Ctenochirichthys being the most closely related taxon to this one. The 5th edition of Fishes of the World classifies this genus in the family Oneirodidae in the suborder Ceratioidei of the anglerfish order Lophiiformes.

== Etymology ==
Puck pinnata is the only species in the genus Puck. Pietsch described the figure of Puck from Germanic folklore as "a minor order of mischievous devils, sprites, goblins or demons; a devilish trickster". Pietsch has since confirmed that he used the name because this taxon is a "devil", because it is a member of a group of bathypelagic and mesopelagic anglerfishes colloquially referred to as sea devils or black seadevils. He also said that it was a "trickster" because it is an ambush predator, waiting in the absulote darkness of the deep and lures in prey with bioluminescent bait. The Specific name, pinnata, means "plumed" or "winged", an allusion to the long, thin pectoral fins.

== Description ==
Puck pinnata is known only from metamorphosed females. They are distnighuished from most other taxa within Oneirodidae by the length of the pectoral fin lobe which is a similar to the lobes in Ctenochirichthys, Chirophryne and Leptacanthichthys. This species is separated from these taxa in the possession of a short snout, highly convex frontal bones and oblique suspension of the mandible. It has a short, broad mouth, a feature which separates it from Chirophryne and Leptacanthichthys while the possession of robust spines on the sphenotic and angular bones separates it from Ctenochirichthys. The longest of the 4 known specimens had a length of 8.1 cm (3.2 in).

== Distribution and habitat ==
Puck pinnata has been recorded from four widely separated localities. These are the type locality as well as in the eastern tropical Pacific at about 6°N, 88°W, off the Galapagos Islands and in the northeastern Atlantic at about 35°N, 32°W. A report from off the Bōsō Peninsula of Japan needs to be verified. The 4 known specimens, all females, were taken were caught in nets at depths between 1,464 and 4,500 m (4,803 and 14,764 ft).
