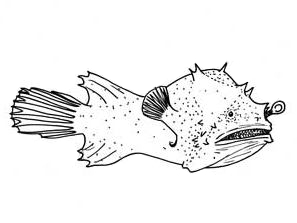
- Female P. spiniceps

Conservation status
- Least Concern (IUCN 3.1)

Scientific classification
- Kingdom: Animalia
- Phylum: Chordata
- Class: Actinopterygii
- Order: Lophiiformes
- Family: Linophrynidae
- Genus: Photocorynus; Regan, 1925
- Species: P. spiniceps

Binomial name
- Photocorynus spiniceps Regan, 1925

= Photocorynus =

Species of fish

Photocorynus is a monospecific genus of marine ray-finned fish belonging to the family Linophrynidae, the leftvents. The only species in the genus is Photocorynus spiniceps.

Photocorynus was first proposed as a genus in 1925 by the English ichthyologist Charles Tate Regan when he described its only species, P. spiniceps. The holotype of P. spiniceps was collected by the Danish research vessel Dana from the Gulf of Panama at 7°15'N, 78°54'W, from a depth of around 1,250 m (4,100 ft). The 5th edition of Fishes of the World classifies this taxon in the family Linophrynidae, within the suborder Ceratioidei, the deep sea anglerfishes, of the anglerfish order Lophiiformes.

Photocorynus means "light club", an allusion to the bioluminescent sac at the end of the short, club-like illicium. The specific name, spiniceps, means "spiny head", a reference to the robust spines on the sphenotic bone.

The known mature male individuals are 6.2–7.3 millimetres (0.24–0.29 in), smaller than any other mature fish and vertebrate; the females, however, reach a significantly larger size of up to 50.5 millimetres (2 in). Numerous fish species have both sexes reaching maturity below 20 millimetres (0.79 in).

Photocorynus spiniceps has a circumglobal distribution in the Atlantic and Pacific Oceans. In the Atlantic Ocean it has been recorded from both sides between 32°N and 13°S. In the Pacific it has been recorded from Japan, Hawaii and the Gulf of Panama. Specimens have been taken from depths between 990 and 1,420 m (3,250 and 4,660 ft).

Like most other deepsea anglerfishes, Photocorynus spiniceps lures its prey into striking range using a bioluminescent sac at the end of an illicium, the highly modified first ray of the dorsal fin, and swallows the prey whole with the help of a distending jaw and a similarly distending stomach. Its prey can sometimes be as big as their own bodies. The male spends its life fused to its much larger female counterpart, therefore effectively turning her into a hermaphrodite. The male has to bite the female in order to spend the rest of its life fused together.

While the female takes care of swimming and eating, the male, with a large proportion of its body consisting of testes, is charged with the task of aiding reproduction.

== See also ==
- Smallest organisms
