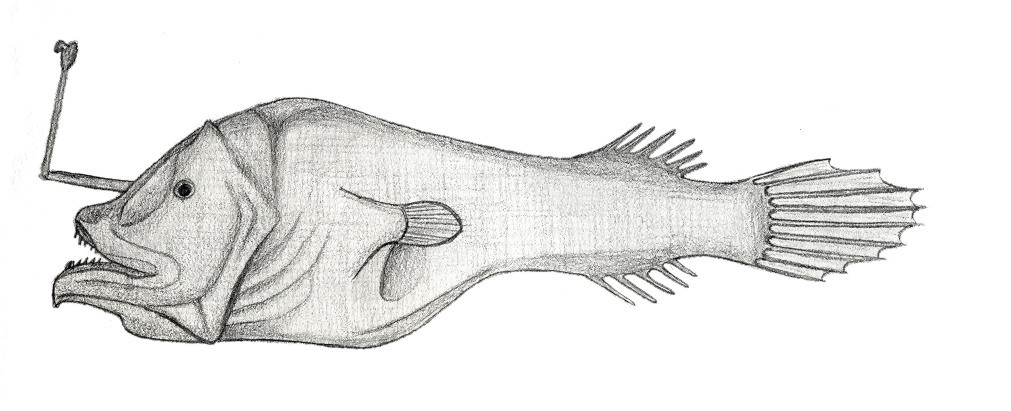

Conservation status
- Least Concern (IUCN 3.1)

Scientific classification
- Kingdom: Animalia
- Phylum: Chordata
- Class: Actinopterygii
- Order: Lophiiformes
- Suborder: Ceratioidei
- Family: Centrophrynidae; Bertelsen, 1951
- Genus: Centrophryne; Regan & Trewavas, 1932
- Species: C. spinulosa

Binomial name
- Centrophryne spinulosa Regan & Trewavas, 1932

= Horned lantern fish =

Species of fish

The horned lantern fish or prickly seadevil (Centrophryne spinulosa), is a species of marine ray-finned fish and the only species in the monotypic family Centrophrynidae. This species has a circumglobal distribution and is distinguished from other deep-sea anglerfishes by several characteristics, including four pectoral radials, an anterior spine on the subopercular bone, and a short hyoid (chin) barbel in both sexes.

== Taxonomy ==
The horned lantern fish was first formally described in 1932 by the British ichthyologists Charles Tate Regan and Ethelwynn Trewavas with its type locality given as the Pacific Ocean off northern New Guinea at 1°20'S, 138°42'E, Dana station 3768, from a depth of around 2,000 m (6,600 ft). Regan and Trewavas named the new genus Centrophryne for this species, but C. spinulosa was not formally designated as its type species until Maurice Burton did so in 1934. In 1851, Erik Bertelsen classified Centrophryne within the monotypic family Centrophrynidae. The 5th edition of The 5th edition of Fishes of the World classifies the taxon in the suborder Ceratioidei of the anglerfish order Lophiiformes.

== Etymology ==
Centrophryne is a combination of the word kentron, meaning "thorn" or "spine", and phryne, a suffix commonly used in the names of anglerfish genera. Its use may date as far back as Aristotle and Cicero, who referred to anglerfishes as "fishing-frogs" and "sea-frogs", respectively, possibly because of their resemblance to frogs and toads. The first part of the name refers to the prickly skin of females. The specific name spinulosa means "bearing minute spinules", also a reference to the spined (prickly) skin of females.

== Distribution ==
The horned lantern fish occurs in the Pacific Ocean from Baja California south to the Marquesas Islands and the Gulf of California. Specimens have also been captured in other locations, including New Guinea, the South China Sea, Venezuela, and the Mozambique Channel, suggesting a wide oceanic distribution in tropical and subtropical waters. Specimens were caught at depths from 650 to over 2000 m (2130–6560 ft), while larvae have been recovered close to the surface to a depth of 35 m (115 ft).

== Description ==
The female horned lantern fish measures up to 23 cm (9.1 in) in length and is long and slender, with a large head and jaws of equal length. The jaws are filled with slender, recurved, depressible teeth of mixed large and small sizes. There is a large oval pit in front of each eye in specimens larger than 42 mm. The eye itself lies beneath the skin and appears through a translucent patch. The fish is reddish brown to black in color; its skin is covered with numerous close-set spines. The illicium ("fishing rod") and esca (lure) are attached to the snout. The esca has a fan-shaped appendage in front and another short appendage on the back; the tip is white with scattered large melanophores. There is a small hyoid barbel, although it is vestigial in adult females.

The males are much smaller and dark brown in color, measuring up to 1.6 cm (0.63 in) long and lacking the illicium and esca. The known specimens are all immature, though already with large olfactory organs and well-developed denticular plates on the tip of the snout bearing 3-4 curved teeth each. Their hyoid barbel distinguishes them from the males of all other deep-sea anglerfish. The two known larvae measure 4.2 mm and 7.5 mm long and have short, stout bodies with moderately inflated skin.

== Biology ==
Unlike other deep-sea anglerfish, female horned lantern fish have only a single ovary lined with villi-like epithelial projections rather than epithelial folds. Similar to other ceratioid anglerfish, the males of the horned lantern fish undergo sexual parasitism. A female horned lantern fish has been found with a parasitic male Melanocetus johnsonii attached, though the coupling was likely in error (possibly occurring while the two fish were in the net) and there was no fusion of tissues.

The function of the hyoid barbel in the horned lantern fish is unknown. The only other deep-sea anglerfishes that have a hyoid barbel are the linophrynids, where it occurs only in the females and is often elaborate or bioluminescent.
