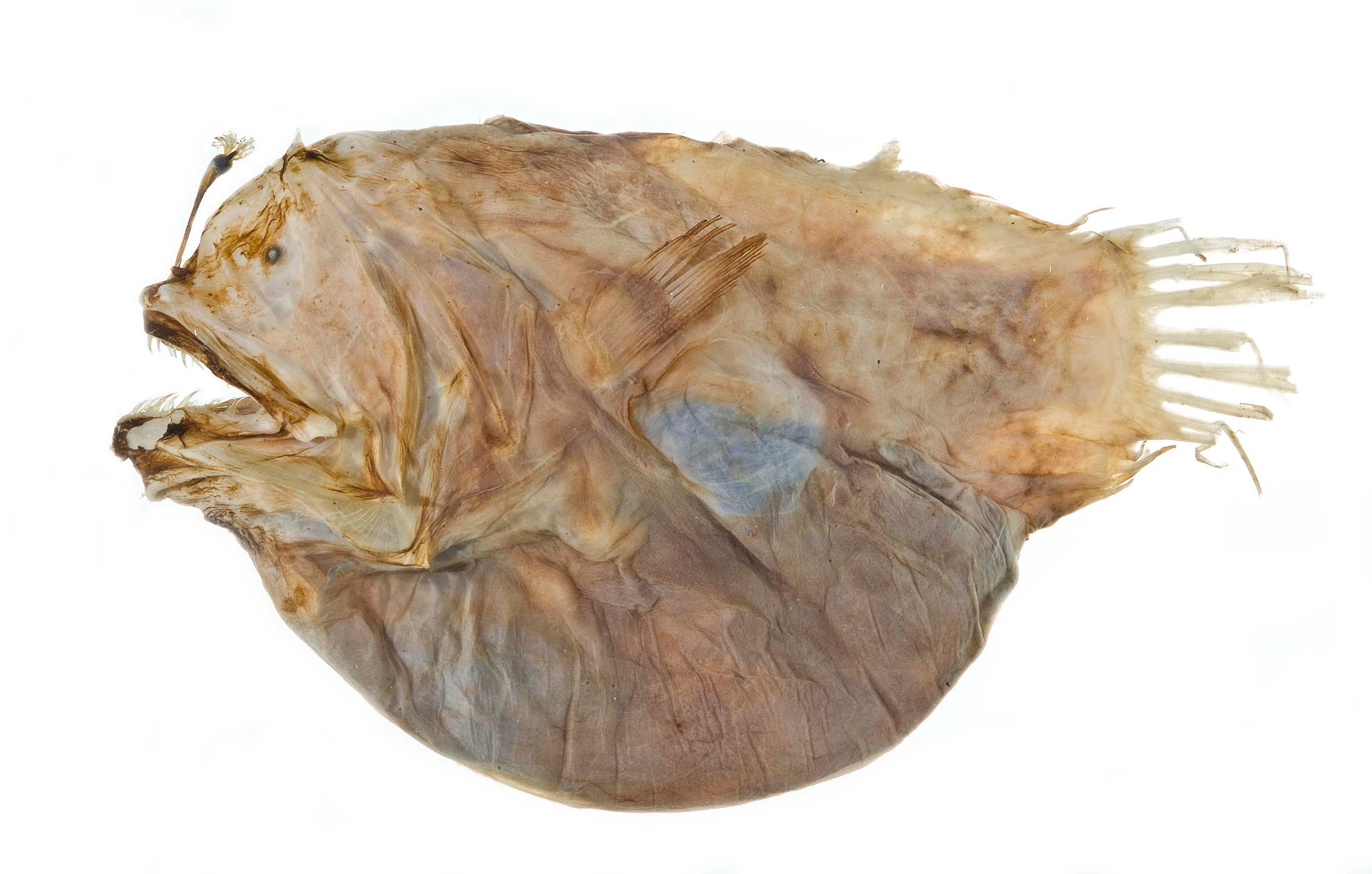

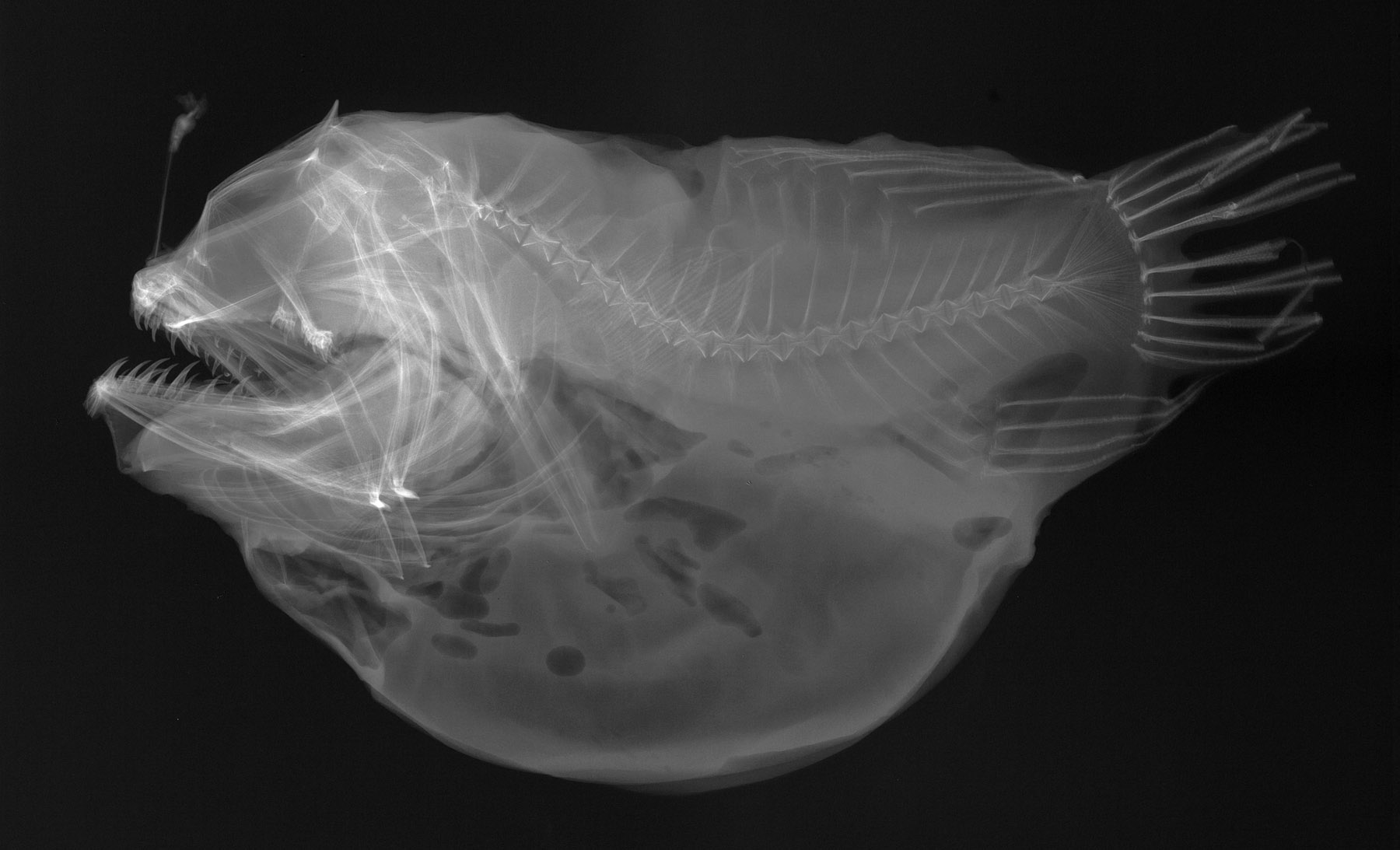
- Dermatias platynogaster, conventional and X-ray images

Conservation status
- Least Concern (IUCN 3.1)

Scientific classification
- Kingdom: Animalia
- Phylum: Chordata
- Class: Actinopterygii
- Order: Lophiiformes
- Family: Oneirodidae
- Genus: Dermatias; H. M. Smith & Radcliffe, 1912
- Species: D. platynogaster

Binomial name
- Dermatias platynogaster H. M. Smith & Radcliffe, 1912

Synonyms
- Dolopichthys platynogaster (H. M. Smith & Radcliffe, 1912); Pietschichthys horridus Kharin, 1989

= Dermatias =

Monotypic genus of fish

Dermatias is a monospecific genus of marine ray-finned fish belonging to the family Oneirodidae, the dreamers, a family of deep sea anglerfishes. The only species in the genus is Dermatias platynogaster which is known from 4 metamorphosed female specimens collected from 3 widely separated localities in the Western Pacific Ocean.

== Taxonomy ==
Dermatias was first proposed as a genus in 1923 by the American ichthyologists Hugh McCormick Smith and Lewis Radcliffe with its only species, D. platynogaster, designated as its type species. D. platynogaster was described by McCormick and Radcliffe with its type locality given as near Sialat Point Light off the eastern coast of Luzon at 13°40'57"N, 123°57'45"E, Albatross station D.5463 in the Philippines at a depth of 300 fathoms (1,800 ft; 550 m). The 5th edition of Fishes of the World classifies this taxon in the family Oneirodidae in the suborder Ceratioidei of the anglerfish order Lophiiformes.

== Etymology ==
Dermatias means "one who has skin", an allusion to the kine being "naked, very loose, and soft". The specific name platynogaster combines platyno, which means "to widen", with gaster, meaning "stomach", thought to be a reference to the "ventral surface greatly decurved, the very large stomach hanging down like a great pouch".

== Description ==
Dermatias has 6 soft rays in its dorsal fin and 4 in its anal fin. The males and larvae of this species have not been collected and the species is only known from 4 female specimens. The metamorphosed females differ from other species of oneirodids in the unusually deep caudal peduncle, the blunt and short snout, the highly convex frontal bones which create a very short head and they have a smaller number of teeth in the jaws, between 20 and 32 in the upper jaw, 20 to 31 in the lower jaw. They also have vomerine teeth, large sphenotic spines which are directed outwards and upwards, a robust spine on the symphysis of the lower jaw, the hyomandibular has a double head, there is a large spine on the quadrate bone and an articular spine which is shorter than half the length of the spine on the quadrate. They also have a deeply incised rear margin of the operculum. there is a long, thin subopercle which has its dorsal end tapering to a point and an oval ventral end. There is no internal pigmentation on the fin rays of the caudal fin. The illicium is markedly longer than the length of bulb of the esca and its pterygiophore emerges on the snout between the frontal bones with its front end exposed and its rear end hidden beneath the skin. The skin is apparently naked lacking in dermal spinules and the dark pigmented skin of the caudal peduncle clearly reaches past the base of the caudal fin. The maximum published standard length of 17.5 cm (6.9 in).

== Distribution and habitat ==
Dermatias has been recorded from three widely scattered localities in the Western Pacific Ocean. Apart from the type locality it has been recorded from the Townsville trough off northeastern Australia and the Magellan Seamounts. The specimens have been collected from depths between 539 and 1,342 m (1,768 and 4,403 ft).
