= Lophodolos =

Scientific classification
- Kingdom: Animalia
- Phylum: Chordata
- Class: Actinopterygii
- Order: Lophiiformes
- Family: Oneirodidae
- Genus: Lophodolos; Lloyd, 1909

Type species
- Lophodolos indicus Lloyd, 1909

Genus of fishes

Lophodolos is a genus of marine ray-finned fish belonging to the family Oneirodidae, the dreamers, a family of deep sea anglerfishes. These predatory, deep-sea fishes are found in the tropical and subtropical oceans around the world.

== Taxonomy ==
Lophodolos was first proposed as a monospecific genus in 1909 by the Indian Medical Service military doctor and naturalist major Richard E. Lloyd, also of the University of Calcutta and the Marine Survey of India, when he described Lophodolos indicus. The type locality of L. indicus was given as southwest of Cape Comorin, off Travancore in India in the Laccadive Sea at 7°28'30"N, 76°26'30"E, from Investigator station 307 at a depth of 0–888 fathoms (0–5,328 ft; 0–1,624 m). The 5th edition of Fishes of the World classifies this genus in the family Oneirodidae in the suborder Ceratioidei of the anglerfish order Lophiiformes. Lophodes has been described as the most derived genus within its family, and although it seems to have evolved from an ancestral form similar to Microlophichthys, it is now very specialised and is dissimilar to the other genera in its family.

== Etymology ==
Lophodolos is a combination of lophos, meaning "tuft", an allusion to the esca, and dolos which means deceitful. This small fish uses the esca as bait to deceive prey.

== Species ==
There are currently two recognized species in this genus:

- Lophodolos acanthognathus Regan, 1925 (Whalehead dreamer)
- Lophodolos indicus Lloyd, 1909

== Characteristics ==
lophodolos dreamers are distinguished from other genera in the family Oneirodidae in the morphology of the frontal bones, the absence of a pterosphenoid bone, the pterygiophore of the illicium is exposed between or posterior to the sphenotic spines, the sphenotic and symphisial spines are very large and the hypobranchials II are close to each other at their medial ends, as are hypobranchials III. They are also distinguished by the short snout, the large mouth raeaching backwards past the eye, the lack of vomerine teeth, the articular bone has spines, the spine obn the quadrate bone is larger than the spine on the mandibular bone, the lobe of the pectoral fin is shorter than the longest rays of that fin and wide, the operculum is forked, and the skin is naked without spinules. The skin extends past tha caudal peduncle and onto the caudal fin. They are relatively long and slender rather than globular and the body is coloured dark brown or black with L. acanthognathus having white on the esca and illicium. The maximum published standard lengths fot these fishes is 7.7 cm (3.0 in) for L. indicus and 7.9 cm (3.1 in) for L. acanthognathus.

== Distribution and habitat ==
Lophodolos dreamers have a circumglobal distribution. L. acanthognathus is found in the Atlantic, Indian and Pacific Oceans but does not appear to be uniformy distributed. In the Atlantic Ocean, for example, L. acanthognathus is mainly found between Cuba and Greenland in the western Atlantic and in the eastern Atlantic from 60°N to the continental slope off Africa just south of the equator. L. indicus is also found in the Atalantic, Pacific and Indian Oceans but has a more tropical distribution. L. indicus is uncommon in the Western Atlantic whereas L. acanthognathus is rare in the Eastern pacific. These are bathypelagic fishes which live at depths between 650 and 1,750 m (2,130 and 5,740 ft).
