= Spiniphryne =

Scientific classification
- Kingdom: Animalia
- Phylum: Chordata
- Class: Actinopterygii
- Order: Lophiiformes
- Family: Oneirodidae
- Genus: Spiniphryne; Bertelsen, 1951

Synonyms
- Bertelsenna Whitley, 1954

Genus of fishes

Spiniphryne, also called spiny dreamers, is a genus of dreamers. Like other deep-sea anglerfish, Spiniphryne lure prey to them by means of a modified first dorsal fin ray with a bioluminescent bulb at the tip. Spiniphryne is unique amongst the oneirodids for being covered in tiny spines.

== Species ==
There are currently two recognized species in this genus:

- Spiniphryne duhameli Pietsch & Z. H. Baldwin, 2006
- Spiniphryne gladisfenae (Beebe, 1932) (Prickly dreamer)

== Taxonomy ==
The type species, S. gladisfenae, was originally described by William Beebe in 1932 under the oneirodid genus Dolopichthys. Six months later that year, Regan and Trewavas revised the species into a new genus, Centrophryne, along with the newly described species Centrophryne spinulosa. In 1951, Bertelsen moved C. spinulosa into its own family, Centrophrynidae, but retained "Centrophryne gladisfenae" in the Oneirodidae under a new genus, Spiniphryne. This classification was later upheld by Bertelsen and Pietsch in 1975, who determined that the resemblance between Spiniphryne and Centrophryne is superficial.

== Distribution and habitat ==
The type specimen of S. gladisfenae was collected off Bermuda. S. gladisfenae has been collected from the eastern and western north Atlantic Ocean, the western Indian Ocean, and the western Pacific Ocean ranging from Taiwan to New Zealand. S. duhameli has only been collected from the central and eastern north Pacific Ocean, at a maximum depth of 2500 meters.

== Description ==
Metamorphosed female Spiniphryne have elongate and slender bodies rather than globulose. The body is entirely black except for the appendages at the tip of the esca, which are dark red to bright orange due to blood. The subdermal coloration consists of large, subdermal melanophores most densely grouped along the back. The fin bases and caudal peduncle are unpigmented. The mouth is moderately large, filled with slender, recurved teeth of large and small sizes. The first two or three teeth of the premaxilla are immobile, while the rest can be depressed. They have well-developed sphenotic spines (above the eyes) and a symphysial spine (at the tip of the jaw where the two halves meet). The illicium ("fishing rod") is relatively short. Spiniphryne is distinguished from all other oneirodids by tiny, close-set dermal spinules that entirely cover the body and fins. Males and larvae have yet to be encountered.

The two species of Spiniphryne are distinguished from each other by details of the esca ("lure").
