= Microlophichthys =

Scientific classification
- Kingdom: Animalia
- Phylum: Chordata
- Class: Actinopterygii
- Order: Lophiiformes
- Family: Oneirodidae
- Genus: Microlophichthys; Regan & Trewavas, 1932

Type species
- Dolopichthys microlophus Regan, 1925

Genus of fishes

Microlophichthys is a genus of marine ray-finned fish belonging to the family Oneirodidae, the dreamers, a family of deep sea anglerfishes. The species in this genus are found in the tropical and subtropical parts of the Atlantic, Indian and Pacific Oceans.

== Taxonomy ==
Micrlophichthys was first proposed as a monotypic subgenus of Dolopichthys in 1932 by the British ichthyologists Charles Tate Regan and Ethelwynn Trewavas with Dolopichthys microlophus as its only species. As Regan and Trewavas proposed the subgenus after 1930 they should have explicitly designated a type species in accordance with Article 13b of the International Code of Zoological Nomenclature, this was not done until Maurice Burton designated the type species in The Zoological Record, the authorship should be Burton (ex Regan & Trewavas) but prevailing usage is Regan & Trewavas, 1932. D. microlophus was first formally described in 1925 by Regan with its type locality given as the Eastern Atlantic, about 95 km (59 mi) northeast of Santo Antão, Cape Verde at 17°55'N, 24°35'W from a depth of around 1,500 m (4,900 ft). In 1951, the Danish ichthyologist Erik Bertelsen proposed that Microlophichthys was a valid genus and described a second species, M. andracanthus from the Caribbean Sea. Microlophichthys has been described as one of the more basal genera within the family Oneirodidae. The 5th edition of Fishes of the World classifies this genus in the family Oneirodidae in the suborder Ceratioidei of the anglerfish order Lophiiformes.

== Etymology ==
Microlophichthys is a combination of micro, meaning "small", lophus, meaning "tuft" and ichthys, the Greek word for "fish". The name is an allusion to the short illicium of the type species, the length of the illicium being no greater than one eighth the length of the fish.

== Species ==
Microlophichtys currently has 2 recognised species classified within it:

- Microlophichthys andracanthus Bertelsen, 1951
- Microlophichthys microlophus Regan, 1925 (Short-rod anglerfish)

== Characteristics ==
Microlophichthys anglerfishes are, like the other deep sea anglerfishes, sexually dimorphic. The metamorphosed females are characterised by having naked skin, without spinules. They further have spines on the sphenotic bone and the rear margin of the operculim is deeply incised. The pectoral fins have a lobe which is shorter than the longest rays of that fin and wide. There is a spine at the symphysis of the lower jaw and the dentary bones are convex at the lower margin of the symphyses. The fin rays in the caudal fin have no internal pigmentation, the black skin of the caudal peduncle extends past the caudal fin base. The short illicium emerges on the snout between the frontal bones, the escal bulb has a length which is greater than half of the length of the illicium and the mouth extends past the eye. The metamorphosed males share many of the characteristics of the genus with the metamorphosed females but they have no teeth in their jaws, the upper dentary bone has an undetermined number, some being fused, of denticles which are long and irregularly curved while the lower dentary bone has 8 low and robust denticle on a row with the outer denticle slightly offset. In M. andracanthus, which is known only from males, there are spines on the dorsal part of the upper denticular bone. The maximum published total length is for a female of M. microlophus and was 11.8 cm (4.6 in), while males vary in total length between 2.5 and 17 mm (0.098 and 0.669 in).

== Distribution and habitat ==
Microlophichthys anglerfishes are found in the tropical and subtropical portions of the Atlantic, Indian and Pacific Oceans. M. microlophus has, however, been recorded as far north as the subarctic Atlantic Ocean off Greenland. M. andracanthus is known from only two males, one collected in the Caribbeans in 1922 and one from the Pacific in 1963. These anglerfishes are bathypelagic and are found at depths between 800 and 2,000 m (2,600 and 6,600 ft).
