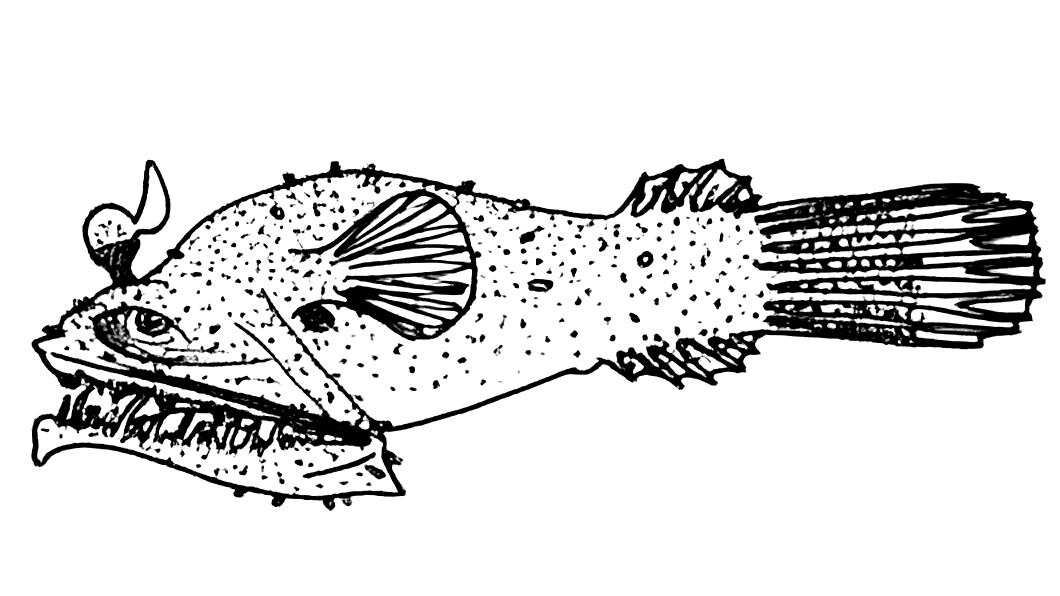

Conservation status
- Least Concern (IUCN 3.1)

Scientific classification
- Kingdom: Animalia
- Phylum: Chordata
- Class: Actinopterygii
- Order: Lophiiformes
- Family: Oneirodidae
- Genus: Tyrannophryne; Regan & Trewavas, 1932
- Species: T. pugnax

Binomial name
- Tyrannophryne pugnax Regan & Trewavas, 1932

= Tyrannophryne =

Monotypic genus of fish

Tyrannophryne is a monospecific genus of marine ray-finned fish belonging to the family Oneirodidae, the dreamers, a family of deep-sea anglerfishes. The only species in the genus is Tyrannophryne pugnax, the tyrant dreamer. Like other oneirodids, T. pugnax is a bathypelagic fish with a bioluminescent lure. It is known only from two adolescent female specimens, one caught in 1928 near Tahiti-Rarotonga, and the other in 1956 northwest of Bikini Atoll.

Tyrannophryne was first proposed as a monospecific genus in 1932 by the British ichthyologists Charles Tate Regan and Ethelwynn Trewavas when they described T. pugnax, its only species. The type locality of T. pugnax was given as the South Pacific near Tahiti at 18°49'S, 153°10'W, Dana station 3577 from a depth of around 2,000 m (6,600 ft). The 5th edition of Fishes of the World classifies this taxon in the family Oneirodidae in the suborder Ceratioidei of the anglerfish order Lophiiformes.

The genus name Tyrannophryne combines tyrannus, meaning "tyrant", with phryne, a suffix commonly used in the names of anglerfish genera. Its use for these fishes may date as far back as Aristotle and Cicero, who referred to anglerfishes as "fishing-frogs" and "sea-frogs", respectively, possibly because of their resemblance to frogs and toads. The specific name, pugnax, means "pugnacious", Regan and Trewavas did not explain this but it is thought to refer to the large oblique mouth and long jaw.

The most distinctive feature of T. pugnax is its extremely long lower jaw, the joint of which extends backwards well past the base of the pectoral fin. The body of the fish is relatively slender, naked, and entirely black in color. The tail fin has unpigmented rays and is covered by dark skin for some distance past its base. The sphenotic spines (above the eyes) and symphysial spine (at the tip of the jaw) are present.

Tyrannophryne pugnax can be found at around 2000 meters depth in the south pacific near the island of Tahiti. These fish can vary in size but are usually around 4.7 centimetres (1.9 in) in length.
