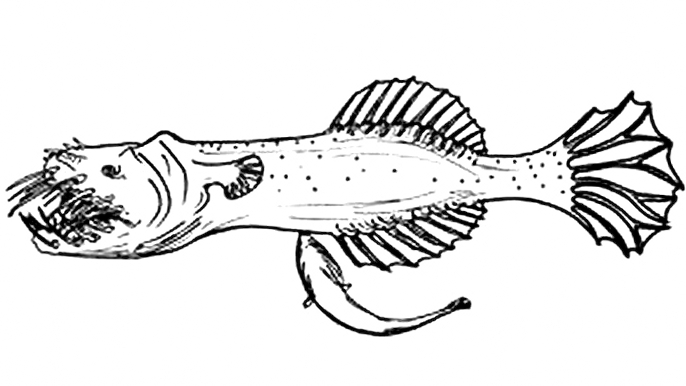

Conservation status
- Least Concern (IUCN 3.1)

Scientific classification
- Kingdom: Animalia
- Phylum: Chordata
- Class: Actinopterygii
- Order: Lophiiformes
- Suborder: Ceratioidei
- Family: Neoceratidae; Regan, 1926
- Genus: Neoceratias; Pappenheim, 1914
- Species: N. spinifer

Binomial name
- Neoceratias spinifer Pappenheim, 1914

= Toothed seadevil =

Species of fish

Neoceratias spinifer, the toothed seadevil, pincushion seadevil, spiny seadevil or netbeard seadevil, is a rarely seen deep-sea anglerfish found in the mesopelagic and bathypelagic zones in Oceans around the World. It is the only species in the family Neoceratiidae, and is unique amongst the deep-sea anglerfish in lacking both the illicium and esca (the "fishing rod" and "lure"), and in having large teeth placed on the outside of its jaws.

== Taxonomy ==
The toothed seadevil was first formally described in 1914 by the German zoologist Paul Pappenheim with the type locality given as the South Atlantic around 416 km (258 mi) north of Saint Helena at 12°11'S, 6°16'W from a depth between 0 and 2,000 m (0 and 6,562 ft). When Pappenheim described this species he classified it in the new monospecific genus Neoceratias. In 1926 Charles Tate Regan created the monotypic family Neoceratiidae for this taxon. The 5th edition of Fishes of the World classifies the family Neoceratiidae in the suborder Ceratioidei of the anglerfish order Lophiiformes.

== Etymology ==
The toothed seadevil has the genus name Neoceratias, which prefixes Ceratias, a genus of anglerfishes, with neo, meaning "new". Pappenheim was not sure what the systematic position of the new species was but he thought that it might be close to Ceratias. The specific name spinifer means "spine bearing", this is an allusion to the long needle-like teeth with hinges located on the jaws external to the mouth.

== Description ==
Toothed seadevils are sexually dimorphic. The adult females have slender, elongate bodies up to 11 centimetres (4.3 in) long. They are dark red-brown to black in color, with naked skin. The mouth is large and extends well past the small eye; the jaws have an inner row of short, straight, widely spaced, immobile teeth. On the outside of the jaws, there are prominent conical outgrowths that bear 2-3 straight teeth, the longest of which reach almost 15% the length of the entire body. Each of these teeth is hinged at the base, with well-developed musculature and a tiny hook at the end. The illicium, or lure, is absent, along with the trough in which it rests in other deep-sea anglerfishes. There are a pair of prominent nasal papillae on the snout; nostrils and olfactory lamellae are absent.

Both the males and larvae differ from other deep-sea anglerfish in having slender bodies. Mature males are only known from parasitic specimens already attached to the females. The largest known specimen is 18 mm long. They are lighter in color than the females and have semitranslucent skin. They are attached to the females by outgrowths of the snout and lower jaw; the olfactory organs are absent and the eyes are degenerate and covered with skin. The larvae are 4–10 mm long, with well-developed olfactory organs and no sexual dimorphism.

== Distribution and habitat ==
The toothed seadevil is found throughout the World. In the Atlantic Ocean it is distributed from off New England south and east to Saint Helena. In the Indian Ocean it has been recorded off far northern Madagascar and in the Bay of Bengal. In the Pacific Ocean it has a wide range extending from the Philippines as far east as Hawaii with a record from as far east as 32°N, 133°E. This species is a deep water fish that has not been collected from depths of less than 1,000 m (3,300 ft).

== Biology ==
The toothed seadevil has no bioluminescent lure and an unusual tooth arrangement, it is unclear what the toothed seadevil feeds upon and how. It has been suggested that their external jaw teeth serve to entangle soft-bodied invertebrates. The males are fully parasitic, using tooth-bearing denticles at the tips of their jaws to attach to the female, fusing their dermis together and permanently attaching to the female. A vascular plexus is found in the connective tissue of the male's head; another was interconnected to the first and found in the female's skin, but these were determined to be enough evidence of a continuity between both individual's vascular systems. While the eyes of two parasitic males were "very degenerate" (atrophied), their digestive systems, hearts, and gills were found not to have undergone such changes.
