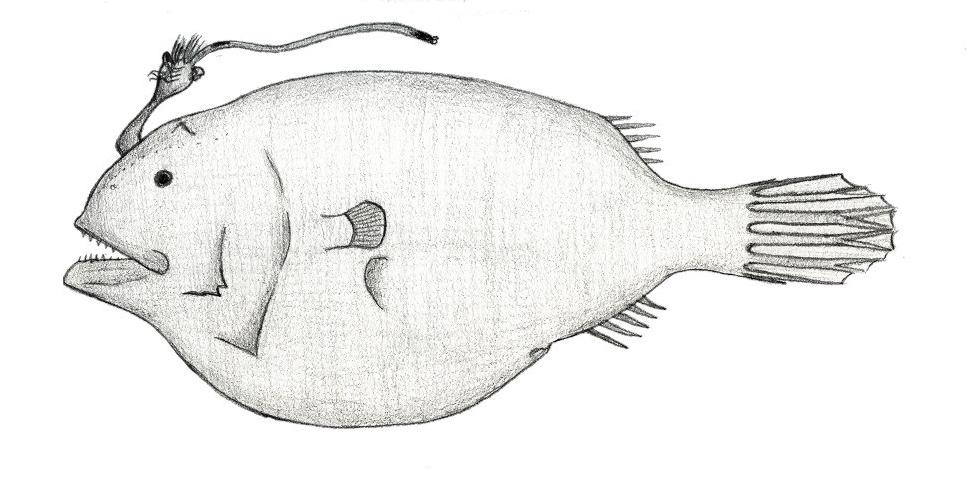
- Phyllorhinichthys balushkini

Scientific classification
- Domain: Eukaryota
- Kingdom: Animalia
- Phylum: Chordata
- Class: Actinopterygii
- Order: Lophiiformes
- Family: Oneirodidae
- Genus: Phyllorhinichthys; Pietsch, 1969

= Phyllorhinichthys =

Genus of fishes

Phyllorhinichthys is a genus of dreamers. Like other oneirodids, they are small, bathypelagic fish with bioluminescent lures. Phyllorhinichthys is unique amongst the deep-sea anglerfish in having a pair of fleshy, leaf-like structures on its snout.

== Species ==
There are currently two recognized species in this genus:

- Phyllorhinichthys balushkini Pietsch, 2004
- Phyllorhinichthys micractis Pietsch, 1969

== Distribution and habitat ==
Phyllorhinichthys micractis has been collected from all three major oceans from a maximum depth of 3500 meters, ranging from near Newfoundland and Bermuda in the Atlantic Ocean, to the Horn of Africa in the Indian Ocean, to Japan and the Line Islands in the Pacific Ocean. P. balushkini has only been collected in the Atlantic Ocean, ranging from the north to the tropics from a maximum depth of 3200 meters.

== Description ==
Adult female Phyllorhinichthys have a short, somewhat globulose body, entirely dark brown to black in color. In smaller specimens (8.8-18.3 mm), there is a distinct band of melanophores on the caudal peduncle. The mouth is small and oblique, with slender, depressible teeth; the teeth are slightly larger but fewer in the lower jaw. The illicium ("fishing rod") is short; the escal bulb ("lure") is internally pigmented on the upper half and unpigmented on the lower, and bears internally pigmented appendages with silvery tips. The most distinctive feature of the genus are a pair of translucent leaf-like flaps on the snout, forward of the eyes and flanking the esca. Each flap has a central opaque nerve fiber running from the base to the tip. In some specimens, there is another, smaller pair of similar flaps placed above the main pair. Males and larvae have yet to be encountered.

The two species of Phyllorhinichthys are differentiated by the length of the illicium and details of the esca.
