= Ctenochirichthys =

Conservation status
- Data Deficient (IUCN 3.1)

Scientific classification
- Kingdom: Animalia
- Phylum: Chordata
- Class: Actinopterygii
- Order: Lophiiformes
- Family: Oneirodidae
- Genus: Ctenochirichthys; Regan & Trewavas, 1932
- Species: C. longimanus

Binomial name
- Ctenochirichthys longimanus Regan & Trewavas, 1932

Monotypic genus of fish

Ctenochirichthys is a monospecific genus of marine ray-finned fish belonging to the family Oneirodidae, the dreamers, a family of deep sea anglerfishes. The only species in the genus is Ctenochirichthys longimanus is known only from two locations, on in the Atlantic Ocean and the other in the Western Pacific Ocean.

== Taxonomy ==
Ctenochirichthys was first proposed as genus in 1932 by the British ichthyologists Charles Tate Regan and Ethelwynn Trewavas when they described C. longimanus. The type locality of C. longimanus was given as the Gulf of Panama at 7°06'N, 79°55'W, Dana station 3548, from a depth of 1,500 m (4,900 ft). The 5th edition of Fishes of the World classifies this taxon in the family Oneirodidae in the suborder Ceratioidei of the anglerfish order Lophiiformes.

== Etymology ==
Ctenochirichthys is a combination of ctenos, which means "comb" with cheiros, meaning "hand", a reference to the long pectoral fins, which have between 24 and 27 (in fact 28 to 30) comb-like rays along its dorsal margin, with ichthys, meaning "fish". The specific name longimanus means "long hand", also a reference to the long pectoral fins

== Description ==
Ctenochirichthys can be distinguished from the other genera in the family Oneirodidae in having poorly developed sphenotic and articular spines which, in most cases, do not erupt through the skin and they have a very elongated lobe of the pectoral fin. The pectoral fin has between 27 and 30 fin rays, higher than any other oneirodid. The metamorphosed females can also be identified by their combination of the following characteristics the possession of vomerine teeth; the frontal bones have a convex dorsal margin, the hyomandibula has a double head, the rear margin of the operculum is deeply incised, the suboperculum is thin and long with its lower end being elongated and rounded and the caudal fin rays have no internal pigmentation. The illicium has a length greater than that of the bulb of the esca and its pterygoiphore is cylindrical along its whole length and emerges from the snout between the two frontal bones with its anterior end exposed and its posterior end concealed beneath skin. The skin is thought to be naked, with no dermal spinules and the dark coloured skin of the caudal peduncle reaches clearly beyond the base of the caudal fin. The metamorphosed males have 13 olfactory lamellae and the upper denticular teeth are arranged in two rows, the inner row with 8 teeth and the outer row with 3 teeth. They also have naked skin with no dermal spinules. The premetamorphisis larvae have an elongated body, its depth and the length of the head are equivalent to 40-45% of the standard length. The concentration of pigment lies to the centre of the subopercle and the dorsal pigmentation is confined to the upper sides. The maximum standard lengthfor females is 3.7 cm (1.5 in) while that of males is 1.2 cm (0.47 in).

== Distribution and habitat ==
Ctenochirichthys is known from only two widely scattered localities: the type locality in the Gulf of Panama where all but one of the known specimens was collected with a single larval male being collected in the northeastern Atlantic to the north of Madeira at 34°N, 17°W. This species ranges in depth between 800 and 1,000 m (2,600 and 3,300 ft).
