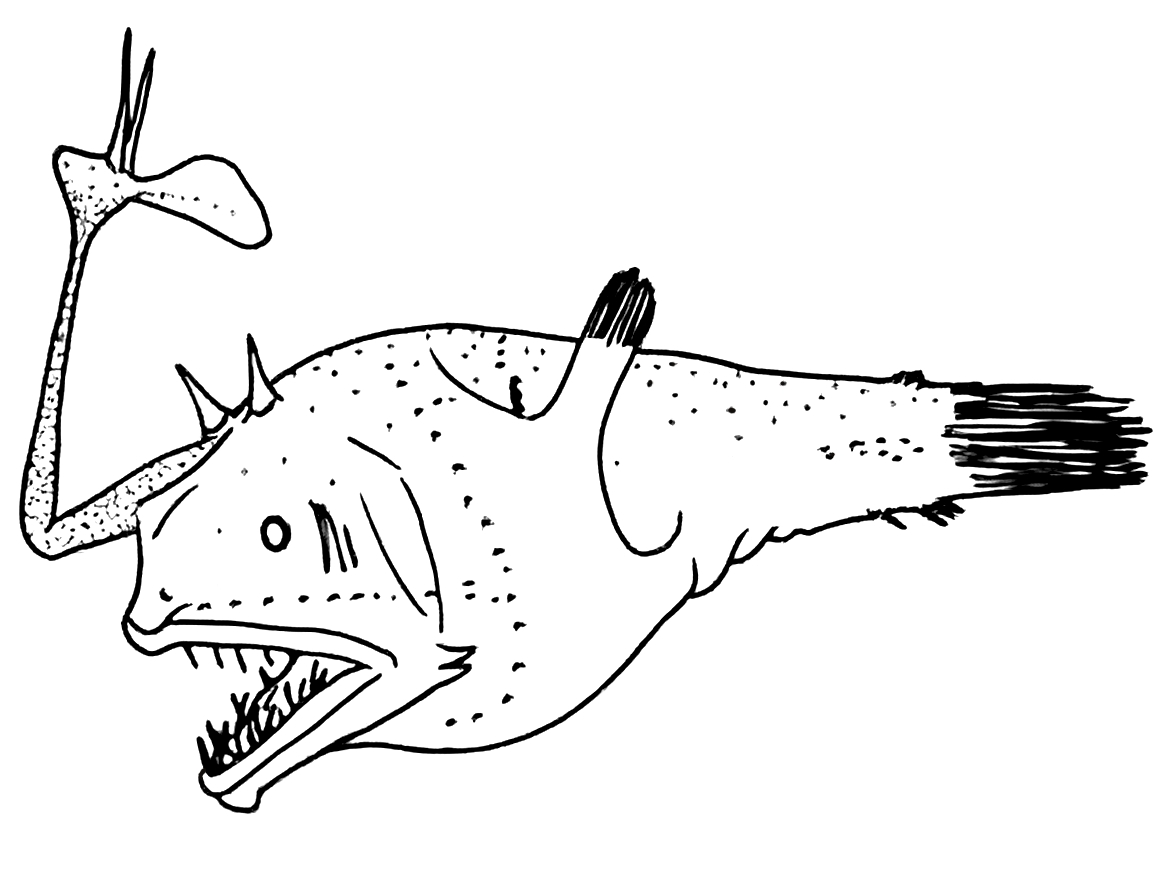

Conservation status
- Least Concern (IUCN 3.1)

Scientific classification
- Kingdom: Animalia
- Phylum: Chordata
- Class: Actinopterygii
- Division: Teleostei
- Order: Lophiiformes
- Family: Oneirodidae
- Genus: Danaphryne; Bertelsen, 1951
- Species: D. nigrifilis

Binomial name
- Danaphryne nigrifilis (Regan & Trewavas, 1932)

Synonyms
- Dolopichthys nigrifilis Regan & Trewavas, 1932; Dolopichthys albifilosa Waterman, 1939

= Danaphryne =

Monotypic genus of fish

Danaphryne is a monospecific genus of marine ray-finned fish belonging to the family Oneirodidae, the dreamers, a family of deep sea anglerfishes. The only species in the genus is Danaphryne nigrifilis which is found in the tropical and temperate regions of all of the world's oceans.

== Taxonomy ==
Danaphryne was first proposed as a monospecific genus in 1939 by the Danish ichthyologist Erik Bertelsen with Dolopichthys nigrifilis as its type species. Dolopichthys nigrifilis was first formally described in 1932 by the British ichthyologists Charles Tate Regan and Ethelwynn Trewavas with its type locality given as the South China Sea at 19°18.5'N, 120°13'E, the Dana station 3716 from a depth of around 1,500 m (4,900 ft). The 5th edition of Fishes of the World classifies this taxon in the family Oneirodidae in the suborder Ceratioidei of the anglerfish order Lophiiformes.

== Etymology ==
Danaphryne combines Dana, the name of the Danish fisheries research vessel Dana from which the type was collected, with phryne, a suffix commonly used in the names of anglerfish genera. Its use for these fishes may date as far back as Aristotle and Cicero, who referred to anglerfishes as "fishing-frogs" and "sea-frogs", respectively, possibly because of their resemblance to frogs and toads. The specific name, nigrifillis means "black thread", referring to the pair filaments on the bulb of the esca which are, thick, tapering and are black with white tips.

== Description ==
Danaphryne has between 5 and 7 soft rays in its dorsal fin and 4 or 5 soft rays in its anal fin. The metamorphosed females are distinguished form other taxa within the family Oneirodidae by having a narrow snout, vomerine teeth and a large, almost circular nasal foramen. They also have an illicial trough which is wider and shallower at its front than at its rear, a well developed sphenotic spine and a spine at the symphysis of the lower jaw. The rays of the caudal fin are unpigmented. The illicium is longer than the escal bulb and has a cytlindrical pterygiophore which emerges on the snout between the frontal bones with irs anterior end exposed and its posterior end hidden underneath the skin. The skin is smooth and has no dermal spinules and there pigmented skin on the caudal peduncle reaches past the base of the caudal fin. The maximum published standard length is 10.5 cm (4.1 in) for a female but the only known male specimen was 0.95 cm (0.37 in).

== Distribution and habitat ==
Danaphryne is found in the eastern and western North Atlantic Ocean between 11°N and 41°N, it has also been recorded from the Davis Strait between Greenland and Canada at 63°18'N, 54°45'W. In the Pacific Ocean it has been recorded from Hawaii, Philippines and the South China Sea, it has not yet been recorded from the Indian Ocean. This species is found on the bathypelagic and mesopelagic zones at depths down to 2,000 m (6,600 ft). This taxon is known from 20 adult and 5 larval specimens.

== Conservation status ==
Danaphryne is assessed as Least Concern by the International Union for Conservation of Nature because it has a wide distribution, lives in deep water and has no known threats.
