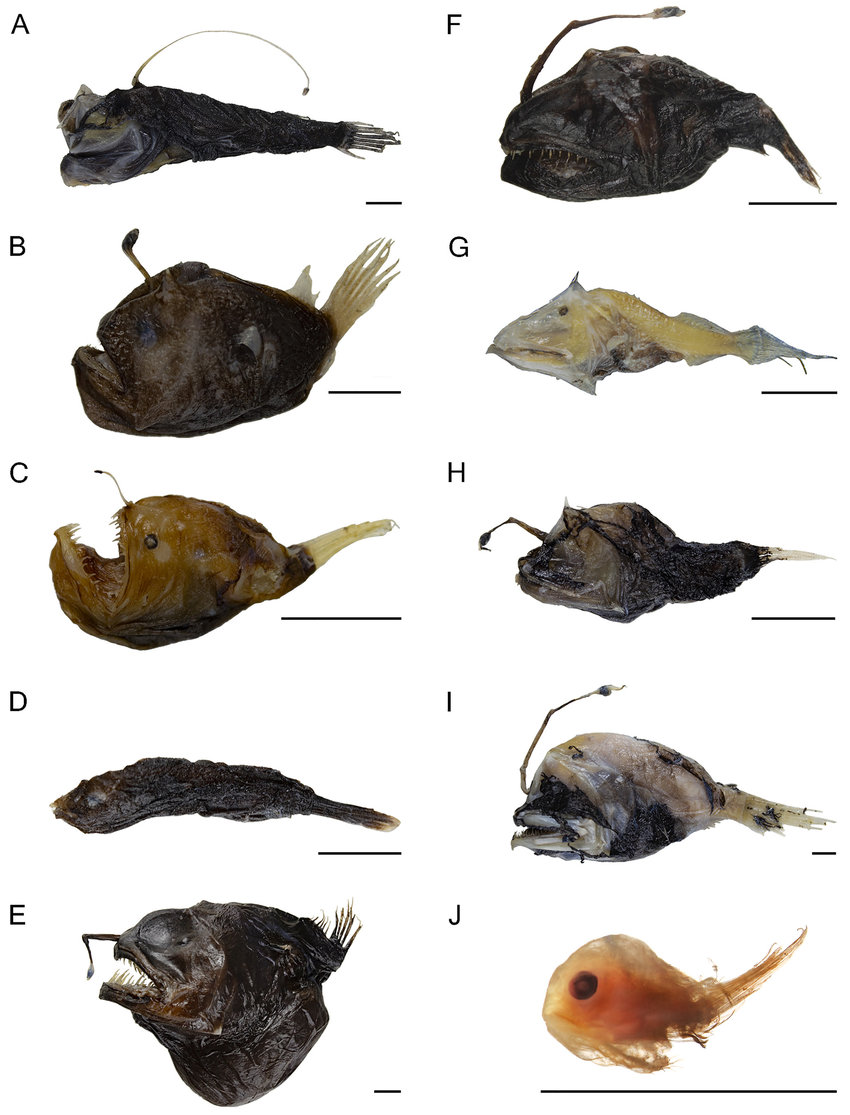
- Ceratioid diversity (Note: Species depicted are (Scale bars = 10 mm): A. Ceratias uranoscopus; B. Himantolophus sp; C. Melanocetus johnsonii; D. Thaumatichthys sp.; E. Chaenophryne draco; F. Chaenophryne ramifera; G. Dolopichthys sp.; H. Oneirodes anisacanthus; I. Oneirodes carlsbergi; J. Caulophryne sp.)

Scientific classification
- Kingdom: Animalia
- Phylum: Chordata
- Class: Actinopterygii
- Division: Teleostei
- Order: Lophiiformes
- Suborder: Ceratioidei; Regan, 1912

Families
- see text

= Ceratioidei =

Ceratioidei Temporal range: Middle Miocene–present

Suborder of fishes

Ceratioidei, the pelagic anglerfishes or deep-sea anglerfishes, is a suborder of marine ray-finned fishes, one of five suborders in the order Lophiiformes, the anglerfishes. These fishes are found in tropical and temperate seas throughout the world, living above the bottom of the deep sea, in the pelagic zone. The esca, the anglerfishes' lure and a defining feature of all anglerfish groups, is bioluminescent in the deep-sea anglerfishes, attracting prey in the vast darkness of the bathypelagic zone which they inhabit.

The deep-sea anglerfishes have extreme sexual dimorphism; the males are many times smaller than the females. To reproduce, a male seeks out a female, using his sharp teeth-like denticles to clamp onto the female. The details of this sexual parasitism varies between the species; in some, the male permanently becomes part of the female's body, their tissues fusing with each other. This is the only known natural example of a process called parabiosis occurring in adult vertebrates.

== Etymology ==
Ceratioidei takes its name from the genus Ceratias, the type genus of the family Ceratiidae and of the suborder. Ceratias means "horn bearer", an allusion to the esca sticking up from the snout, like a horn.

== Description ==
All pelagic anglerfish displays extreme sexual dimorphism, the loss of the pelvic fins found in other anglers, relocation of the pectoral fins, and a general reduction in density through the loss of bony parts, a general decrease in ossification and muscle mass, and the infusion of lipids throughout the body. Elongated dorsal and anal fin rays along with characters of the illicium and esca also support this group as natural. Ceratioids are highly variable in body plan, with the species ranging from elongated to globe-like in body shape.

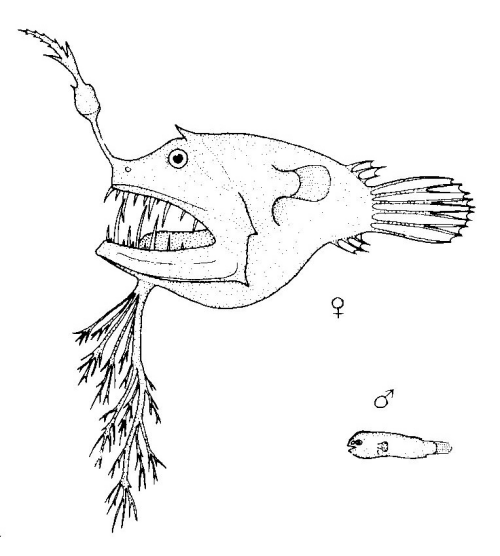
Female and male Linophryne arborifera. Along with the esca, females have a complex hyoid barbel (root-like branching structure under the chin) which is an additional light organ.

Ceratioids are relatively small, with the warty anglerfish Ceratias holboelli being the largest, measuring up to 120 cm (3.9 ft) in TL. Like other anglerfish this group is sexually dimorphic, with the deep-sea anglerfishes being the most extreme examples of such; male C. holboelli can reach up to 16 centimetres (6.3 in) long (SL), while females are commonly around 77 centimetres (2.53 ft) TL, weighing an order of magnitude more than her mate. Male Photocorynus spiniceps were measured to be 6.2–7.3 mm (0.24–0.29 in) at maturity, and were at one time claimed to be the smallest vertebrate known. However, due to not being free-living (being parasitic males) and the females being 50.5 mm (1.99 in), they are now often excluded from the records.

The larvae have well developed eyes, though they stop developing in adult females, where they are thought to be vestigial and only used for light-detection. The eyes of males are variable in development depending on whether the species relies on them to locate females: they may be very well-developed, or they may be highly reduced, as those species rely on olfaction (their sense of smell) instead. The lateral line system is relatively simple, and its pores are often elevated on papillae.

=== Light organs ===
The illicial apparatus or luring system is a modified first dorsal fin, and is composed of several parts: the pterygiophore (a bone which anchors the structure into the body), the illicium (the free-moving "rod"), and the esca (tip). In most species, the esca contains bioluminescent bacteria, allowing them to produce light. An intricate system of musculature controls this apparatus, allowing fine control over its movement; sliding, vibrating, and twisting motions have been observed in living ceratioids. Most female ceratioids can also retract their illicial apparatus into a groove on their cranium's surface. Additional light organs are present in some families: dorsal caruncles (wart-like protrusions) are present in Ceratiidae, while a hyoid barbel is known in Centrophryne and Linophryne. More light organs may be found throughout the skin and on the fins.

Males do not have an illicial apparatus. The equivalent bones that would form this apparatus instead form a specialized structure used to attach to the females. This structure is mainly composed of the denticular bones, formed through the fusion of modified dermal spinules on the front of the head. These spinules resemble hooked "teeth" and allow the males to attach with the females. In some families, the pterygiophore is integrated into this system.

== Evolution ==
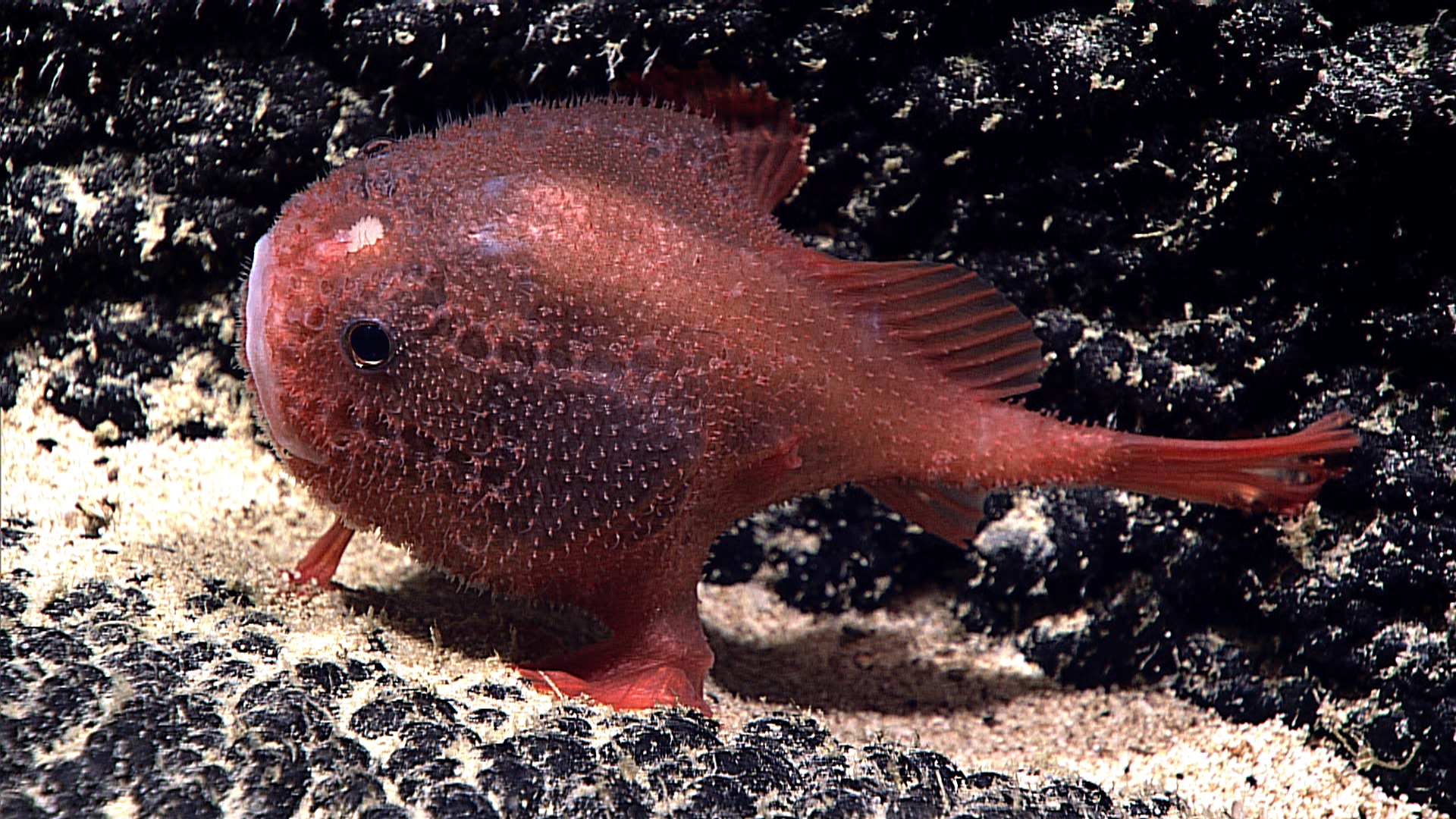
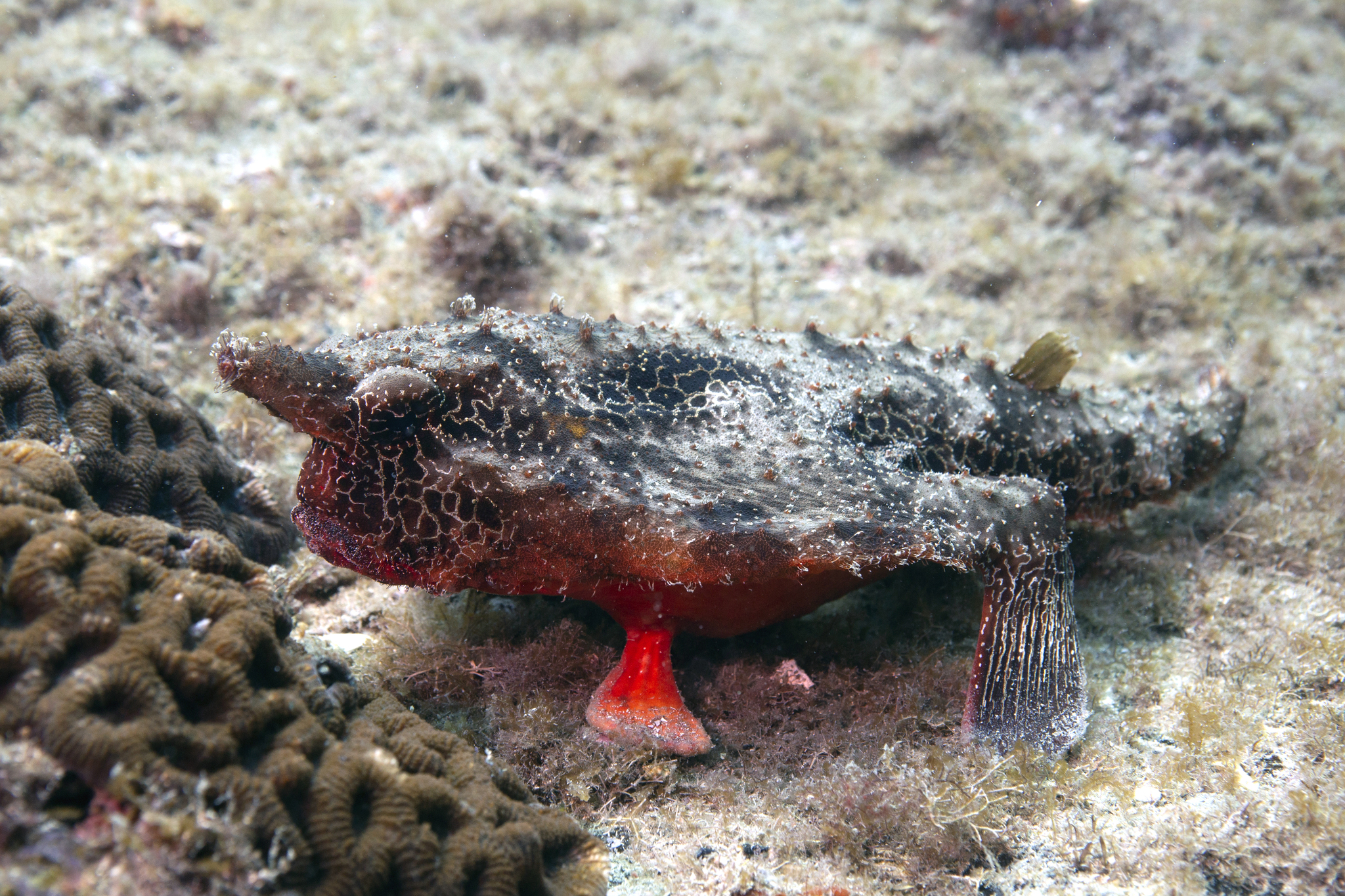
Sea toads (such as Chaunacops, top) and batfish (Ogcocephalus, bottom) may resemble the ancestors of deep-sea anglerfish before they became pelagic.

It is presumed that the ancestor of ceratioids resemble the modern Chaunacoids (deep-sea toads) or Ogcocephaloids (batfish), which live in benthic and/or littoral habitats. These ancestors would eventually retain the pelagic habits of larva Lophiiformes into adolescence.

The divergence of Chaunacidae and Ceratioidei is thought to have occurred after the common ancestor of this group adapted to depths of 1,000–3,000 m (3,300–9,800 ft). A 2024 study found that while the ceratioids likely diverged from the Chaunacidae during the Paleocene, the diversification into their various extant families only occurred throughout the Eocene, following the Paleocene-Eocene Thermal Maximum. This likely also coincides with their colonization of deep sea habitats. Prior to these radiations, ancestors of ceratioids evolved extreme sexual size dimorphism and independently lost adaptive immune genes such as aicda, which allowed male anglerfishes to fuse with females, ultimately leading to the evolution of their sexual parasitism.

Elongated genera and species are thought to have arisen from the globose forms, in various, independent adaptive radiation events.

=== Fossils ===
Owing to the extreme environments they inhabit, fossil remains of deep-sea anglerfishes are very rare in the geologic record. Only a few formations worldwide preserve them, which tend to have been deposited in tectonically active regions where deep-sea sediments could be uplifted to the surface. These include the Puente Formation of California, USA, and the Kurasi Formation of Sakhalin Island, Russia. These formations date to the mid-late Miocene, and specimens recovered from them are assigned to extant genera.

=== Taxonomic history ===
Ceratioidei was first proposed as a grouping in 1912 by the English ichthyologist Charles Tate Regan as the division Ceratiformes within the suborder Lophoidea of the order Pediculati, which included the Batrachoididae. The Batrachoididae are no longer considered to be closely related to the anglerfishes, which are now included in the order Lophiiformes; within that clade the Ceratioidei are in the same clade as the Chaunacoidei with the Antennarioidei and the Ogcocephaloidei as the sisters of that clade. The 5th edition of Fishes of the World treats this grouping as a suborder within the Lophiiformes.

The family Aceratiidae, with its type genus Aceratias (Brauer, 1902), was established to accommodate certain fish which resembled the Ceratiidae and Gigantactinidae, but lacked a luring apparatus. Through closer examination, it was eventually determined that aceratiid fish were actually the males of several distantly related anglerfish species, and so the family is no longer used.

=== Families ===
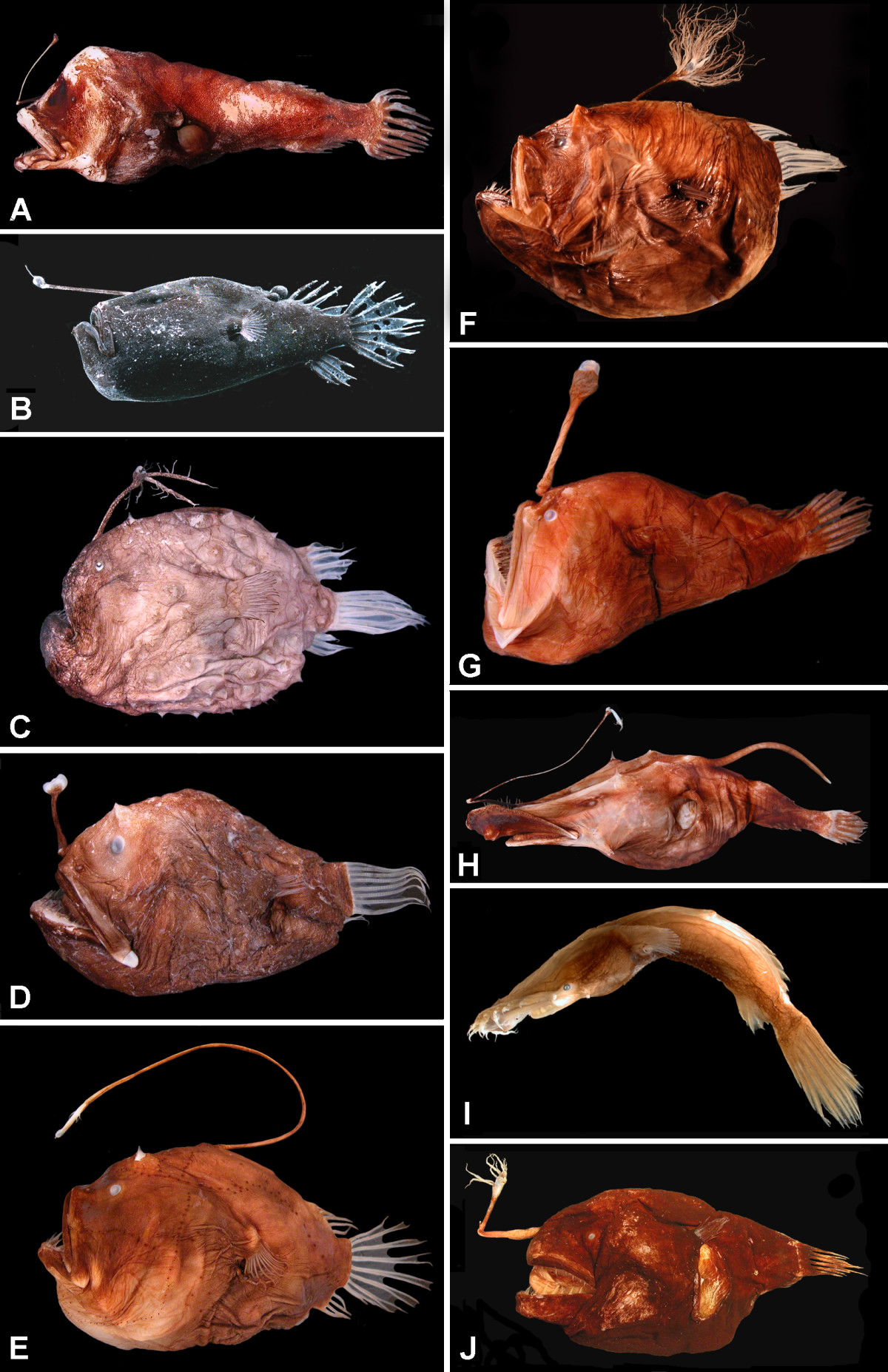
Members of seven ceratioid families (Note: (A) Centrophrynidae: Centrophryne spinulosa; (B) Ceratiidae: Cryptopsaras couesii; (C) Himantolophidae: Himantolophus appelii; (D) Diceratiidae: Diceratias trilobus; (E) Diceratiidae: Bufoceratias wedli; (F) Diceratiidae: Bufoceratias shaoi; (G) Melanocetidae: Melanocetus eustalus; (H) Oneirodidae: Lasiognathus amphirhamphus; (I) Thaumatichthyidae: Thaumatichthys binghami; (J) Oneirodidae: Chaenophryne quasiramifera.)

Monophyly (whether a group is "natural") is supported in this group through shared anatomical features. Identification and classification of this suborder is largely based on characters specific to the females, such as the escal morphology, though some osteological characteristics and meristics (traits that can be counted) are shared between the sexes. Male anglerfish can be identified to the genus level using characteristics of the denticular "teeth" and nostril morphology, but species-level identification has not been possible, even when examining parasitic males.

Ceratioidei contains the following families:

- Ceratiidae Gill, 1861 (Warty seadevils)
- Himantolophidae Gill, 1861 (Footballfishes)
- Melanocetidae Gill, 1878 (Black seadevils)
- Oneirodidae Gill, 1878 (Dreamers)
- Caulophrynidae Goode & Bean, 1896 (Fanfins)
- Gigantactinidae Boulenger, 1904 (Whipnose anglers)
- Thaumatichthyidae Smith & Radcliffe, 1912 (Wonderfishes)
- Linophrynidae Regan, 1925 (Leftvents)
- Neoceratiidae Regan, 1926 (Spiny seadevils)
- Diceratiidae Regan & Trewavas, 1932 (Double anglers)
- Centrophrynidae Bertelsen, 1951 (Prickly seadevils)

=== Phylogeny ===
The cladogram below is based on a phylogenetic tree in Pietsch & Orr (2007);

- Lophiiformes
  - Lophioidei
  - - Antennarioidei
    - - Chaunacoidei
      - - Ogcocephaloidei
        - - Ceratioidei
            ⊞
            ⊟
            - - Centrophrynidae
                Centrophryne
              - Ceratiidae
                - Ceratias
                - Cryptopsaras
            - - - Himantolophidae
                  Himantolophus
              - - - Diceratiidae
                    - Diceratias
                    - Bufoceratias
                - - - Melanocetidae
                      Melanocetus
                  - - - - Thaumatichthyidae
                          - Lasiognathus
                          - Thaumatichthys
                        - Oneirodidae
                          - Lophodolos
                          - - Pentherichthys
                            - - Chaenophryne
                              - Oneirodes
                              - Spiniphryne
                              - Danaphryne
                              - Microlophichthys
                              - Phyllorhinichthys
                              - - Dolopichthys
                                - Bertella
                              - - Puck
                                - Leptacanthichthys
                                - Chirophryne
                      - - - - Caulophrynidae
                              Caulophryne
                          - - - Neoceratiidae
                                Neoceratias
                              - Gigantactinidae
                                - Gigantactis
                                - Rhynchactis
                            - - Linophrynidae
                                - Photocorynus
                                - - Haplophryne
                                  - - Borophryne
                                    - Linophryne

The following cladogram is based on a 2025 analysis of Total Evidence consisting of ultraconserved elements (UCEs), mitochondrial DNA sequence data, and morphological characters. This study reranked a number of clades, and considers suborder Ceratioidei as the infraorder Ceratioideo:

- Tetraodontoidei
- Lophioidei
  - Lophiidae
  - - - Antennariidae
      - Ogcocephalidae
    - - Chaunacidae
      - Ceratioideo
        ⊞
        ⊟
        - Caulophrynidae
          Caulophryne
        - - Linophrynidae
            - - Borophryne
              - Linophryne
            - - Acentrophryne
              - - Haplophryne
                - Photocorynus
          - - - Ceratiidae
                - Ceratias
                - Cryptopsaras
              - Gigantactinidae
                - Rhynchactis
                - Gigantactis
            - - Thaumatichthyidae
                Thaumatichthys
              - - - Centrophrynidae
                    Centrophryne
                  - Neoceratiidae
                    Neoceratias
                - - - Diceratiidae
                      - Bufoceratias
                      - Diceratias
                    - - Melanocetidae
                        Melanocetus
                      - Himantolophidae
                        Himantolophus
                  - Oneirodidae
                    - Spiniphryne
                    - - Oneirodes
                      - - - - Chaenophryne
                            - Pentherichthys
                          - - Lophodolos
                            - - Bertella
                              - Dolopichthys
                        - Danaphryne
                        - Phyllorhinichthys
                        - - Microlophichthys
                          - - Lasiognathus
                            - - Puck
                              - - Chirophryne
                                - Leptacanthichthys

== Biology ==
=== Behaviour ===
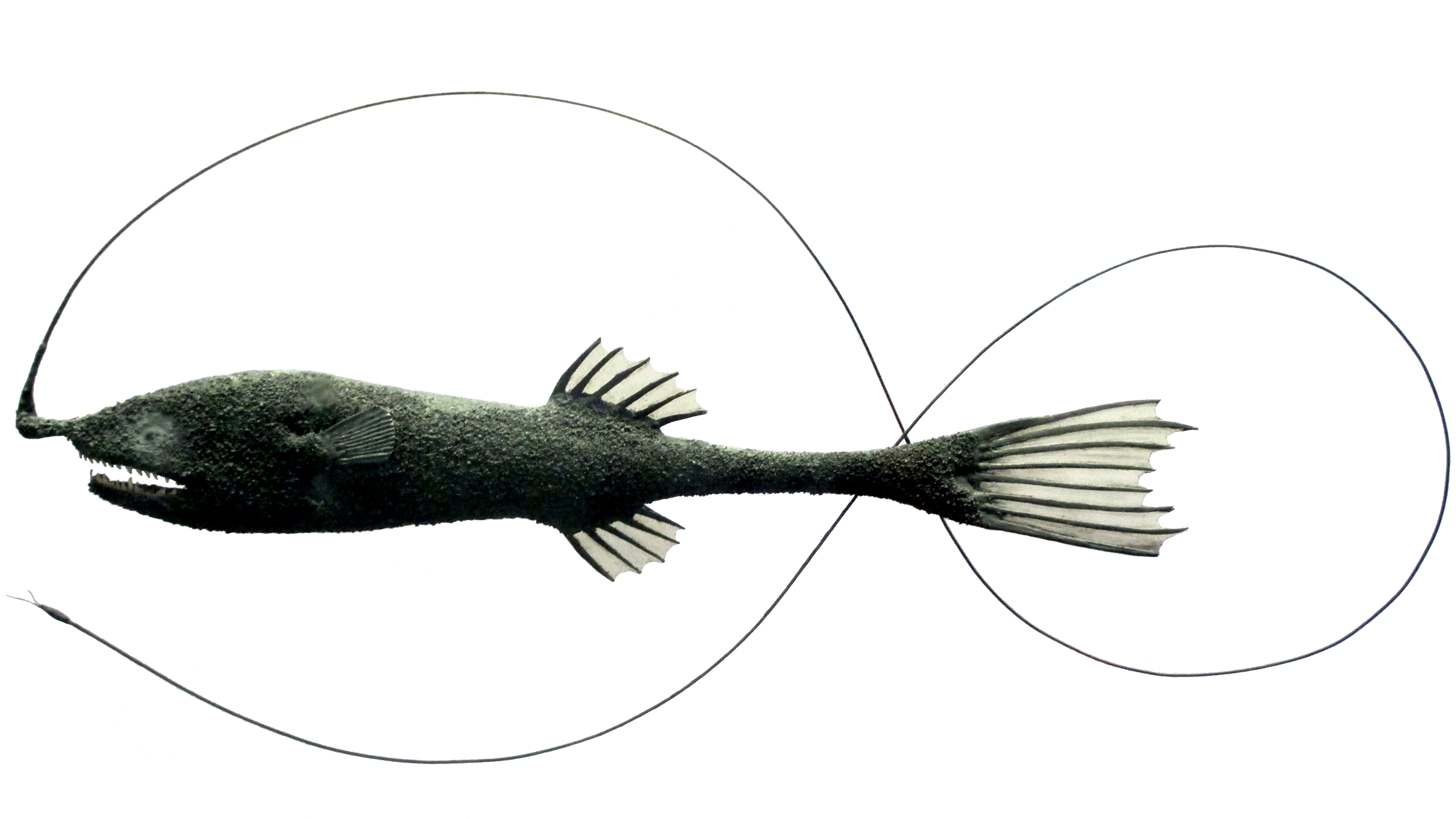
Gigantactis (G. macronema depicted) have been observed floating upside down while luring.

Deep-sea anglerfish have a low rate of metabolism, and often drift without actively swimming; In situ observation of female Oneirodes and whipnose anglerfish (from ROVs) recorded that they often passively float in place or in a current, but they were sometimes observed to attempt to flee from the ROV, beating its pectoral fins in-phase while undulating its tail fin. Notably, the whipnose angler (of the genus Gigantactis) maintained an upside-down position. Cryptopsaras couesii has been observed to maintain a "heads-up" position, facing upwards. While most species are thought to inhabit midwater, specimens of diceratiids and Thaumatichthys have been collected near the seabed, with gut content containing benthic prey such as polychaetes, gastropods, sea urchins, and sea cucumbers.

Larvae are found in much shallower depths than the adults, generally occurring "at depths of less than 30 m (98 ft) and rarely below 200 m (660 ft)". Metamorphosis causes a rapid shift in depth, though post-metamorphic juvenile females still occur at somewhat shallower depths than adults. Adults of most species primarily inhabit a range of between 200 to 3,000 m (660 to 9,840 ft) in depth, though Thaumatichthys is known from the abyssal zone, up to 6,000 m (20,000 ft) in depth.

=== Bioluminescence ===
Light production is likely controlled through esca's blood supply, which provides oxygen and secretions that are used by the bacteria to produce light. Depending on the species, the color of light produced by the esca may vary from pink or purple, to white, yellow, orange, yellowish green, blue, and bluish green, though the peak light frequency is thought to be within the blue-green spectrum as that color is transmitted the furthest in water, and is the frequency that the majority of deep-sea animals are most sensitive to. Cryptopsaras couesii possesses light organs on its skin, thought to allow counterillumination through precise adjustment of these lights. An observed specimen was able to closely match the overhead lighting in the lab; in nature, this ability allows them to camouflage with the little sunlight available.

=== Trophic ecology ===
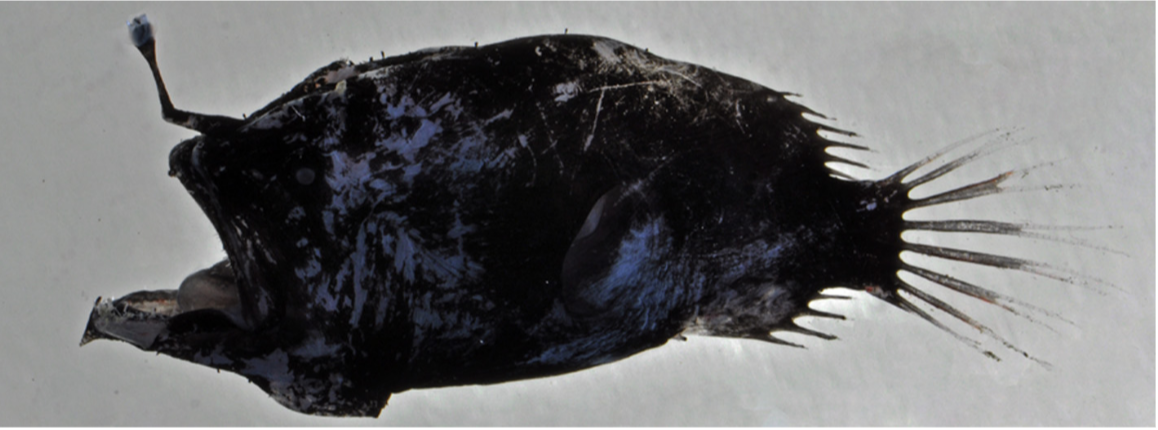
Oneirodes do not seem to be selective about their prey. Depicted is O. luetkeni.

Deep-sea anglers likely use suction feeding akin to most teleost fish. Some ceratioids appear to be unselective with their prey, with chaetognaths, amphipods, copepods, squid, and various kinds of fishes being recovered from the stomach content of Oneirodes dreamers. In contrast, Dolopichthys seem to have some degree of specialization, with the more derived species such as D. allector consuming squid and crustaceans and no fish, unlike the most basal species D. pullatus. Some instances of very large prey items have been recorded, such as a 112 mm (4.4 in) SL Diceratias trilobus female which died after trying to swallow a more than 369 mm (14.5 in) SL Ventrifossa rattail. It is surmised that like many deep-sea fish, ceratioids consume any prey they are able to capture, but due to small sample sizes and the potential of net contamination, biases are likely in these studies; they may not accurately portray the diet of ceratioids.

Various fish are known to prey on ceratioids, such as black scabbardfish (Aphanopus carbo), lancetfish (Alepisaurus), gulper eels (Saccopharynx lavenbergi), and large tunas (Thunnus). Large specimens of Ceratiidae and Himantolophus have also been recovered from the stomachs of sperm whales.

=== Reproduction ===
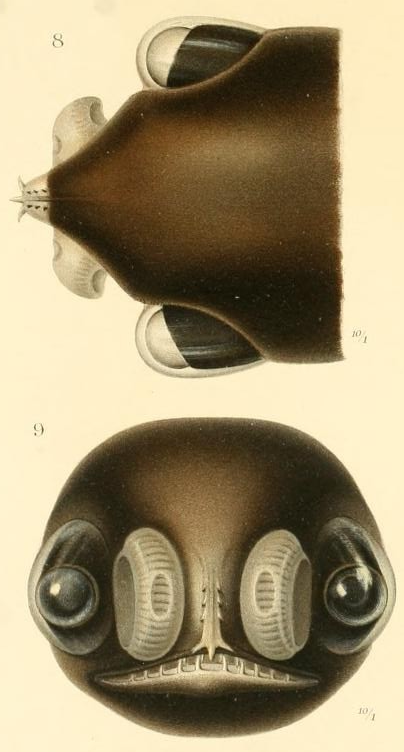
Head of Aceratias macrorhinus (=Linophryne sp.). Their large eyes and enlarged scent organs are used to locate females, and the denticular apparatus at the front of the snout is used to attach to them.

Generally, males locate females through a combination of visual and olfactory means, though some species are thought to specialize in one sense at the cost of the other: with some relying solely on vision, possessing an unusually wide binocular field of vision to detect bioluminescent caruncles on the dorsum of females (Ceratiidae), or exceptionally developed olfactory structures within their nostrils to detect female pheromones (Gigantactinidae). In some families, such as Centrophrynids and Neoceratiids, the methods males use to locate females remain unclear.

==== Sexual parasitism ====
Sexual parasitism is a mode of sexual reproduction unique to the Ceratioidei facilitated by their extreme sexual dimorphism. The core of the behavior is the physical attachment of the males onto the female's body for reproduction, which is further separated into three categories: obligatory parasitism, where the males need to permanently attach to the females and fuse their tissues together; temporary nonparasitic attachment, in which males are able to live independently; and facultative parasitism, where both parasitic attachment and independent males occur. The term "sexual parasitism" is used because the males in the obligate-parasitic species are incapable of feeding after metamorphosis, and must continue latching onto the female to acquire nutrition, akin to an ectoparasite. If they do not find a mate, the males are presumed to eventually starve and die. Furthermore, sexual maturation in these species is triggered by the attachment of the male to the female. This behavior has evolved multiple times within the group, developing independently up to 7 times; the diversity in the nature and location of the males' attachment is evidence of this independent evolution.

One possible explanation for the evolution of sexual parasitism is that the relative low density of females in deep-sea environments leaves little opportunity for mate choice among anglerfish. Females remained relatively large to improve fecundity: a larger female would be able to have volumetrically larger ovaries and eggs. Males would be expected to shrink to reduce metabolic costs in resource-poor environments and would develop highly specialized female-finding abilities. In situations where the prospect of finding mates is poor, it would be beneficial if a male could permanently associate with females, which likely would improve lifetime fitness relative to free living males. This may have led to the development of fusion; an attached male is more likely to participate in multiple fertilization events, ensuring paternity and reproductive success for every such event when he is attached. Conversely, higher probabilities of male-female encounters within a habitat might correlate with species that demonstrate facultative parasitism or a more typical, temporary contact mating.

===== Mechanisms =====
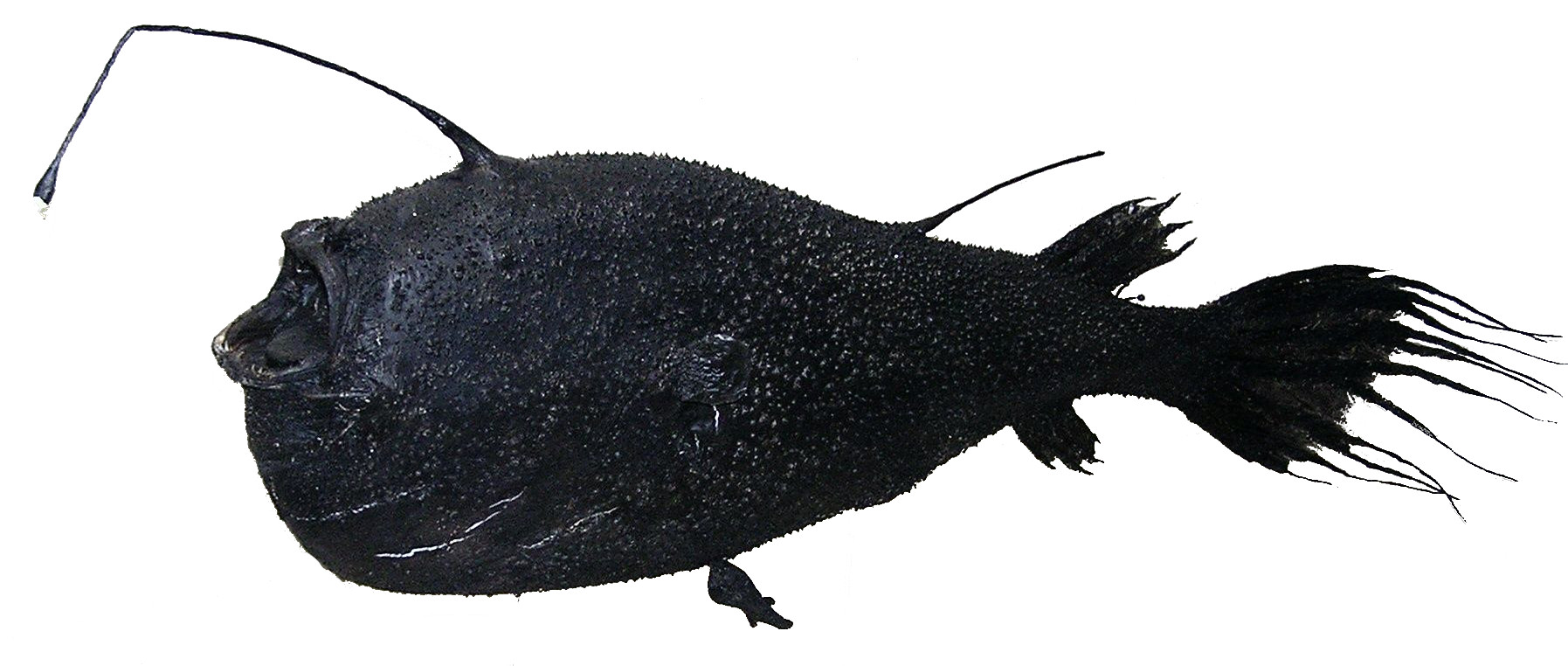
Taxidermied Krøyer's angler fish (Ceratias holboelli), female with parasitic male on ventrum

The effective loss of certain aspects of ceratioid immune systems, such as the adaptive immune system, is a key factor in allowing the fusion between the sexes. It is assumed they have evolved new immune strategies which compensate for the loss of B and T lymphocyte functions found in animals with an adaptive immune system.

In obligate parasitic species, the male bites into the female's skin using the denticular apparatus, beginning the process of fusion and eventually receiving nutrients via their connected circulatory systems, though he retains functional gills and provides for his own oxygen needs; the male's attachment point, an outgrowth of the female's tissue resembling a nipple or a stalk, often leaves a gap where water can flow through his mouth and out the gills. In the toothed seadevil, where the males were observed to attach so completely that they often lacked any remaining oral opening, respiration is thought to occur through pumping water in and out of the opercular openings, as the gills remain well-developed. After fusion, males increase in volume and often become much larger relative to free-living males of the species, and the longer a male is attached, the more atrophied his body becomes. Though sensory organs like the eyes and nostrils degenerate, the hearts, gills, and fin rays of males are retained. (Note: Even in the aforementioned toothed seadevil (Neoceratias spinifer), where the males in an advanced state of fusion appear as if "embedded in or absorbed by the female", these organs are retained, suggesting that he is not reliant on his mate for respiration.)

This parasitism has developed to the point that, at least in Ceratiids and some leftvents, both sexes never mature (their gonads do not ripen) before fusion takes place. After fusion, they live and remain reproductively functional as long as the female stays alive, and can take part in multiple spawning events; this union of the female and male has been referred to as a single hermaphroditic organism. Multiple males can be incorporated into a single individual female, with up to eight males attaching almost anywhere on the body in the triplewart seadevil, though some taxa appear to have a strict one male per female rule, such as Linophryne spp., where males almost always attach to the ventral midline, in front of the female's genital opening. This method ensures that when the female is ready to spawn, she has a mate immediately available, which was surmised by Charles Tate Regan in 1926.

Subsequent studies discovered that the sexes of even the smallest larvae (2-3 mm in total length) can be determined through the early development of the illicium, appearing as a small undifferentiated papilla on the snout of female larvae; thus the idea of sex being determined through attachment and non-attachment is unfounded.

In non-parasitic species, so far including black seadevils, footballfishes, double anglers, whipnose angler, and most genera of dreamers; both sexes mature independently, without requiring fusion, and the males attach temporarily. Indeed, there is no evidence of sexual parasitism in this group: despite males of the black seadevils having been observed attaching firmly to their mates, there was no evidence of fusion. The denticular apparatus in these males enable them to attach to the females and presumably to capture prey items as well, as food has been found in some males of these species, (Note: The prey being chaetognaths and small crustaceans, though in some species these may remain from feedings prior to full metamorphosis) and they continue to grow after metamorphosis (Note: Males increase in length by 6.5–12 millimetres (0.26–0.47 in), significant when the largest individuals of these males are 16.5–39 millimetres (0.65–1.54 in) long) even after depleting the energy stores within their livers. It is probable that these males only attach to females once they are ready to spawn.

Facultative parasitism is known in fanfins along with the plainchin dreamarm and Bertella, the latter pair being Oneirodids. This method is an intermediate between non-parasitism and obligate; both sexes mature independently, but males attach regardless of the female's maturity. If both are sexually mature, they spawn, fertilization occurs, and the male presumably detaches to recover, feed, and search for another mate. If either partner aren't ready to spawn, the male attaches until they are ready; the longer he remains attached, the greater the chances are of him fusing and becoming a sexual parasite.

==== Spawning ====
Like other lophiiforms, ceratioid females form an "egg raft" or "veil", a mass that forms around the eggs during spawning and retains them together. This raft has multiple functions: each egg is surrounded by "thousands of tiny canals within the matrix", and as the raft absorbs water, waterborne sperm is also absorbed to allow for fertilization. The raft also gives the attached males enough time to adequately fertilize the eggs during spawning. Once it is released, the mass protects the eggs from predators that feed on singular, free-floating eggs, while its buoyancy carries it into the sunlit epipelagic zone, where the larvae eventually hatch into a productive environment which allows for their development.

== Bibliography ==
- Pietsch, Theodore W. (2009). Oceanic anglerfishes: extraordinary diversity in the deep sea. Berkeley: University of California Press. ISBN 978-0-520-94255-4. OCLC 1298208235.
- Pietsch, Theodore W. (August 2005). "Dimorphism, parasitism, and sex revisited: modes of reproduction among deep-sea ceratioid anglerfishes (Teleostei: Lophiiformes)". Ichthyological Research. 52 (3): 207–236. Bibcode:2005IchtR..52..207P. doi:10.1007/s10228-005-0286-2. ISSN 1341-8998.
