= Chirophryne =

Conservation status
- Least Concern (IUCN 3.1)

Scientific classification
- Kingdom: Animalia
- Phylum: Chordata
- Class: Actinopterygii
- Order: Lophiiformes
- Family: Oneirodidae
- Genus: Chirophryne; Regan & Trewavas, 1932
- Species: C. xenolophus

Binomial name
- Chirophryne xenolophus Regan & Trewavas, 1932

Monotypic genus of fish

Chirophryne is a monospecific genus of marine ray-finned fish belonging to the family Oneirodidae, the dreamers, a family of deep sea anglerfishes. The only species in the genus is Chirophryne xenolophus, the longhand dreamer. This species is known from a few locations in the Atlantic and Pacific Oceans.

== Taxonomy ==
Chirophryne was first proposed as a genus in 1932 by the British ichthyologists Charles Tate Regan and Ethelwynn Trewavas when they described C. xenolophus. The type locality of C. xenolophus was given as the South China Sea off the Philippines at 14°37'N, 119°52'E from Dana station 3731, taken from a depth of 1,250 m (4,100 ft). The 5th edition of Fishes of the World classifies this taxon in the family Oneirodidae in the suborder Ceratioidei of the anglerfish order Lophiiformes.

== Etymology ==
Chirophryne is a combination of cheiros, which means "hand", a reference to the very long pectoral fins of this fish, with phryne, meaning "toad", a suffix commonly used in the names of anglerfish genera. Its use for these fishes may date as far back as Aristotle and Cicero, who referred to anglerfishes as "fishing-frogs" and "sea-frogs", respectively, possibly because of their resemblance to frogs and toads. The specific name, xenolophus, is a combination of xenos, which means "strange" or "foreign", with lophus, meaning "crest" or "tuft", assumed to refer to the structure of a translucent bulb-like esca, which is a globular pigmented gland-like organ with a short, curved, tapering forward appendage joined to the bulb by a thin membrane.

== Description ==
Chirophryne has 5 or 6 soft rays in the dorsal fin and 4 soft rays in the anal fin. The metamorphosed females are distinguished from other oneirodid fishes by the possession of vomerine teeth, they have short frontal bones which sit to the rear of the ethmoid and have a convex dorsal margin. The sphenotic spines are very well developed and there is a small spine on the symphysis of the lower jaw. The hyomandibula has a double head. There is a highly developed quadrate spine which is between four and nearly six times longer than the articular spine. There is a deep notch on the rear opercular margin and the suboperculum is short and wide with a rounded dorsal endand oval ventral end. The second pharyngobranchial is well developed. There is no internal pigmentation on the caudal fin rays. The illicium is longer than length of the bulb of the esca and the dorsal fin of the illicium is cylindrical along its entire length, emerging on the snout between the frontal bones with its anterior end being slightly exposed and the posterior end hidden under the skin. The first dorsal fin ray is well developed and the lobe of the pectoral fin is long and narrow, with a greater length than the longest rays of the fin; pectoral fin rays number 18 or 19. There are no dermal spinules in the skin and the darkly pigmented skin of the caudal peduncle clearly reaches past the base of the caudal fin.

== Distribution and habitat ==
Chirophryne has been recorded from four locations in the Atlantic and Pacific Oceans, from the South China Sea, two localities in the Eastern Pacific and from the Gulf of Mexico. It is a bathypelagic species found at depths between 1,230 and 1,400 m (4,040 and 4,590 ft).
