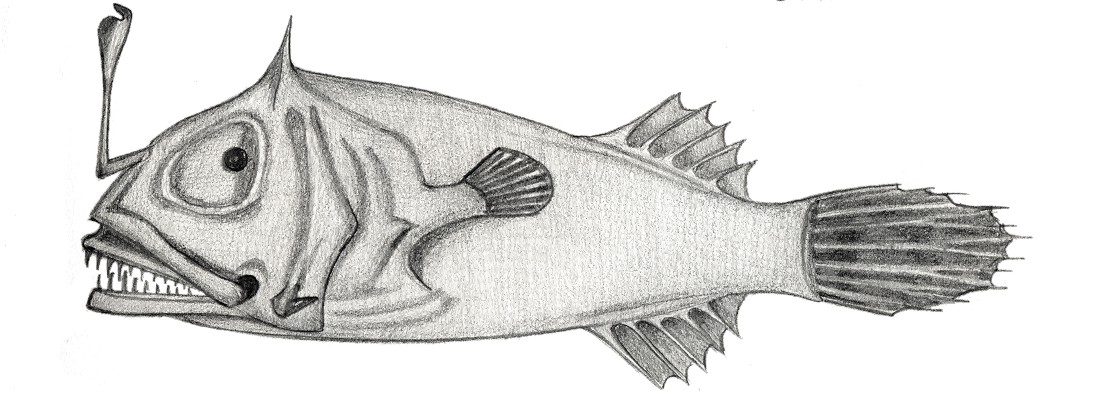

Conservation status
- Data Deficient (IUCN 3.1)

Scientific classification
- Kingdom: Animalia
- Phylum: Chordata
- Class: Actinopterygii
- Order: Lophiiformes
- Family: Oneirodidae
- Genus: Leptacanthichthys; Regan & Trewavas, 1932
- Species: L. gracilispinis

Binomial name
- Leptacanthichthys gracilispinis (Regan, 1925)

Synonyms
- Dolopichthys gracilispinis Regan, 1925

= Plainchin dreamarm =

Species of fish

The plainchin dreamarm (Leptacanthichthys gracilispinis) is a species of marine ray-finned fish belonging to the family Oneirodidae, the dreamers, a family of deep sea anglerfishes. It is the only species in the monospecific genus Leptacanthichthys. This species occurs in the North Atlantic and North Pacific Oceans at depths down to 2,000 m (6,600 ft).

== Taxonomy ==
The plainchin dreamarm was first formally described in 1925 as Dolopichthys gracilispinis by the English ichthyologist Charles Tate Regan with its type locality given as the eastern Pacific Ocean off Panama at 6°40'N, 80°47'W from a depth of 1,750 m (5,740 ft). In 1932 Regan and Ethelwynn Trewavas reclassified D. gracilispinis into the monospecific subgenus of Dolopichthys, Leptacanthichthys, but in 1951 Erik Bertelsen proposed that Leptacanthichthys was a valid genus. The 5th edition of Fishes of the World classifies this taxon in the family Oneirodidae in the suborder Ceratioidei of the anglerfish order Lophiiformes.

== Etymology ==
The plainchin deamarm is placed in the genus Leptacanthichthys, a name which combines leptos, meaning "slender", and acanthus, which means a "thorn" or a "spine", with ichthys, the Greek for "fish". The specific name. gracilispinis, means "slender spine". Both names are an allusion to the "long and slender" articular spines of this species.

== Description ==
The plainchin dreamarn has between 4 and 6 soft rays in the dorsal fin and 5 in the anal fin. The metamorphosed adults are distinguished from other members of the Oneirodidae by the possession of a well-developed spine on the manbible and in having an elongated, thin lobe to the pectoral fin. They overall colour is dark with unpigmented patches on the esca. The metamorphosed females have a very large spine on the articular bone, much largere than the spine on the quadrate bone. They have vomerine teeth and the forward end of the illicial trough is wider than its rear end. There are large spines on the sphenotic bone and a small spine at the symphysis of the lower jaw. The operculum has a deeply notched rear margin. The rays of the caudal fin have no interna; pigmentation with the dark pigmented skin on the caudal peduncle extends past the base of the caudal fin. The illicium is longer than the bulb of the esca, the illicial pterygiophore is cylindrical along its whole length, emerging between the frontal bones on the snout with its anterior end just poking through te skin and its rear end hidden beneath the skin. The skin is naked and has no spinules in it. The metamorphosed males also have a long and narrow lobe to the pectoral fin, the lobe being longer than longest pectoral fin rays, articulating along its upper margin. They have 6 teeth on the lower denticular bone and like the females they also have no dermal spinules in the skin. The maximum published standard length of metamorphosed females is 6.9 cm (2.7 in) while that of metamorphosed males is 0.8 cm (0.31 in).

== Biology ==
Plainchin dreamarm males are facultative sexual parasites on the females.

== Distribution and habitat ==
The plainchin dreamarm is found in the northern Atlantic Ocean as far east as the Azores and as far north as Greenland, it is also found in the northern Pacific Ocean. This species is found as deep as 2,000 m (6,600 ft).
