= Maurice Burton =

British zoologist and author (1898–1992)

Maurice Burton (28 March 1898 – 9 September 1992) was a British zoologist and popular science author, who produced many natural history encyclopedias and books including a skeptical treatment of the Loch Ness Monster.

== Early life and education ==
Burton was born in Hornsey, London, England, on 28 March 1898. He attended Holloway School. Burton studied zoology at King's College, London under Arthur Dendy.

== Career ==
Burton became a schoolteacher. He later joined the staff of the Natural History Museum, London in 1926 where he remained for the rest of his career until his retirement in 1958. He was Curator of Sponges at the museum from 1927 to 1948, then its Deputy Keeper of Zoology from 1949 to 1958.

His popular science writing included major work on encyclopedias and acting as Science Editor for the Illustrated London News and Nature Correspondent for the Daily Telegraph. In 1961, he published the book The Elusive Monster which reviews the evidence for the Loch Ness Monster in the light of his professional knowledge. He concluded that it was unlikely that such creatures were living in Loch Ness. He commented further on this topic in the New Scientist. Many of Burton's books were aimed at a juvenile audience. Some of his later books or revised editions were published with his son, Robert Burton (born 1941) also trained as a zoologist and who published many natural history books himself. Robert also took over his father's Nature Notes column in the Daily Telegraph. His daughter Jane Burton illustrated many of the books.

== Personal life and demise ==
Burton married Margaret Maclean in 1929. They had two sons and a daughter.

He died in Albury, Surrey, on 9 September 1992. Sound recordings of Burton are available at The Albury History Society.

== Publications ==
- 1938 (with A. Dendy): Outlines of Evolutionary Biology (Constable)
- 1952: Curiosities of Animal Life (Ward Lock)
- 1953: Animal Courtship (Hutchinson)
- 1955: When Dumb Animals Talk (Hutchinson)
- 1956: Infancy in Animals (Hutchinson)
- 1957: Animal Legends (Coward-McCann)
- 1959: The Phoenix Reborn (Hutchinson)
- 1960: Under the Sea (Franklin Watts)
- 1961: The Elusive Monster: An analysis of the evidence from Loch Ness (Hart-Davies)
- 1962: Systematic Dictionary of Mammals of the World (Museum Press)
- 1965: Young Animals (Hamlyn)
- 1968: Animals, Vol. 3 of the Frank Watts Reference Library (Frank Watts)
- 1968: University Dictionary of Mammals of the World (Crowell)
- 1968: Wild Animals of the British Isles (F. Warne)
- 1969: Animal World in Colour (12 volumes) (Children's Press)
- 1971: Animal Oddities: The Strangest Living Creatures (Odhams), ISBN 0-600-78704-4
- 1972: Encyclopedia of Animals in Colour (Octopus), ISBN 0-7064-0169-7
- 1973: The Sea's Inhabitants (Eric Thomas)
- 1973: The Sixth Sense of Animals (Taplinger), ISBN 0-8008-7232-0
- 1974: All-Colour Book of Baby Animals (Octopus)
- 1974: Prehistoric Animals (F. Muller), ISBN 0-584-62046-2
- 1974 (with R. Burton: The Life of Reptiles and Amphibians (Octopus), ISBN 0-356-04504-8
- 1975 (with R. Burton): Encyclopedia of Insects and Arachnids (Octopus), ISBN 0-7064-0432-7
- 1976 (with R. Van Assen & C. J. Barnard): Guide to the Mammals of Britain and Europe (Elsevier)
- 1976 (with R. Burton): Encyclopedia of the Animal Kingdom (Octopus), ISBN 0-7064-0456-4
- 1979 (with R. Burton): The Animal World: an encyclopaedia of animal behaviour (Macmillan)
- 1979: A Zoo at Home (J. M. Dent), ISBN 0-460-04383-8
- 1980 (with R. Burton): The New Funk & Wagnall's Illustrated Wildlife Encyclopedia (Funk & Wagnall)
- 1980 (with R. Burton): The New International Wildlife Encyclopedia (Purnell)
- 1990: The Life of Fishes (Simon & Schuster), ISBN 0-7500-0052-X
- 1994 (with Robert Burton): The Marshall Cavendish International Wildlife Encyclopedia
