= Pietsch =

Pietsch is a German surname. Notable people with the surname include:

- Bill Pietsch (1935–2004), American politician and businessman
- Charles Francis Pietsch (1844–1920), American German-language newspaper publisher
- Coral Wong Pietsch (born 1947), American brigadier general
- Edna Frida Pietsch (1894-1982), American composer
- Gustav Pietsch (1893–1975), German captain, resistance fighter, and politician
- Hans Pietsch (Go player) (1968–2003), German Go player
- Hans Pietsch (1907–1967) German mathematician and cryptographer
- Janine Pietsch (born 1982), German Olympian backstroke swimmer
- Johannes Pietsch (born 2001), Austrian singer
- Ludwig Pietsch (1824–1911), German painter, art critic, and writer
- Paul Pietsch (1911–2012), German racing driver and magazine publisher
- Sara Mohr-Pietsch (born 1980), British music broadcaster
- Theodore Wells Pietsch I (1869–1930), American architect
- Theodore Wells Pietsch II (1912–1993), American automobile stylist and industrial designer
- Theodore Wells Pietsch III (born 1945), American evolutionary biologist
- Vonnie Pietsch (born 1936), American politician
