= Gigantactis kreffti =

Conservation status
- Least Concern (IUCN 3.1)

Scientific classification
- Kingdom: Animalia
- Phylum: Chordata
- Class: Actinopterygii
- Order: Lophiiformes
- Family: Gigantactinidae
- Genus: Gigantactis
- Species: G. kreffti

Binomial name
- Gigantactis kreffti Bertelsen, Pietsch & Lavenberg, 1981

Species of fish

Holotype site (ISH 1099-1971: south western Atlantic

Gigantactis kreffti is a species of marine ray-finned fish belonging to the family Gigantactinidae, the whipnose anglers. This species is found in the deeper waters of the South Atlantic and Western Pacific Oceans.

== Taxonomy ==
Gigantactis krefftii was first formally described in 1981 by Erik Bertelsen, Theodore W. Pietsch and Robert J. Lavenberg with its type locality given as the South Atlantic at 39°19'S, 3°15'W, Walther Herwig station 406/71, from a depth of 0–2,000 m (0–6,562 ft). This species is placed within the genus Gigantactis, which the 5th edition of Fishes of the World classifies within the family Gigantactinidae, a family within the suborder Ceratioidei, the deep sea anglerfishes of the order Lophiiformes, the anglerfishes.

== Etymology ==
Gigantactis kreffti is a member of the genus Giganactis, the name of which is a combination of gigantos, meaning "giant", with actis, which means "ray", an allusion to the unusually long illicium of the genus's type species, G. vanhoeffeni. The specific name honours the German ichthyologist Gerhard Krefft of the Institute for Sea Fisheries in Hamburg, recognising his contribution to the knowledge of the fauna of the deep seas.

== Description ==
Gigantactis kreffti is known only from metamorphosed females. These are elongated anglerfishes with an elongate caudal peduncle and a relatively short illicium, which is no greater than 120% of the standard length of the fish. The esca is pear-shaped, rounder in younger females, and rather spiny. The esca has short filaments near its tip and no filaments on its base. The teeth in the upper jaw are arranged in one series with few teeth on the sides of the jaw; there are 4 or 5 series of long teeth in the lower jaw. The caudal fin is relatively short, covered in skin, and with rays that have a length equivalent to 30% of the standard length. This species has a maximum published standard length of 25.2 cm (9.9 in).

== Distribution and habitat ==
Gigantactis kreffti has been recorded from 4 widely scattered localities, two in the southwestern Atlantic off South Africa and two in the Western Pacific, one off Tasmania and one off Japan. It has been collected from depths between 1,000 and 2,000 m (3,300 and 6,600 ft).
