= Gigantactis meadi =

Conservation status
- Least Concern (IUCN 3.1)

Scientific classification
- Kingdom: Animalia
- Phylum: Chordata
- Class: Actinopterygii
- Order: Lophiiformes
- Family: Gigantactinidae
- Genus: Gigantactis
- Species: G. meadi

Binomial name
- Gigantactis meadi Bertelsen, Pietsch & Lavenberg, 1981

Species of fish

Holotype (MCZ 52572) site: south-west Indian Ocean'"`UNIQ--ref-0000000B-QINU`"''"`UNIQ--ref-0000000C-QINU`"'

Gigantactis meadi, Mead's whipnose, is a species of marine ray-finned fish belonging to the family Gigantactinidae, the whipnose anglers. This species is found in the deeper waters of the southern Atlantic, Indian and Pacific Oceans.

== Taxonomy ==
Gigantactis meadi was first formally described in 1981 by Erik Bertelsen, Theodore W. Pietsch and Robert J. Lavenberg with its type locality given as the southwestern Indian Ocean at 34°14'S, 64°56'E, or 33°53'S, 64°55'E, Anton Bruun station 352A, from a depth of 0–350 m (0–1,148 ft). This species is placed within the genus Gigantactis, which the 5th edition of Fishes of the World classifies within the family Gigantactinidae, a family within the suborder Ceratioidei, the deep sea anglerfishes of the order Lophiiformes, the anglerfishes.

== Etymology ==
Gigantactis meadi is a member of the genus Giganactis, the name of which is a combination of gigantos, meaning "giant", with actis, which means "ray", an allusion to the unusually long illicium of the genus's type species, G. vanhoeffeni. The specific name honours Giles W. Mead, a biology professor at Harvard University, deep sea explorer and ichthyologist, for being chief scientist the expedition it was collected on and for his overall contributions to ichthyology.

== Description ==
Gigantactis meadi is a plain black whipnose angler that has a comparatively short illicium with a tuft of white filaments at its base and short filaments along the length of the rear of the illicium. There is a rear elongation of the esca, which is twice its width and constricted at its base. The lower jaw has 5 or 6 rows of long teeth. This species has a maximum published standard length of 28.5 cm (11.2 in).

== Distribution and habitat ==
Gigantactis meadi has a circumglobal distribution in the southern hemisphere between 30 and 53°S. It has been found at depths between 1,250 and 2,000 m (4,100 and 6,560 ft).
