= Gigantactis elsmani =

Conservation status
- Least Concern (IUCN 3.1)

Scientific classification
- Kingdom: Animalia
- Phylum: Chordata
- Class: Actinopterygii
- Order: Lophiiformes
- Family: Gigantactinidae
- Genus: Gigantactis
- Species: G. elsmani

Binomial name
- Gigantactis elsmani Bertelsen, Pietsch & Lavenberg, 1981

Species of fish

Holotype site (ISH 1360-1971): south Atlantic Ocean'"`UNIQ--ref-0000000B-QINU`"'

Gigantactis elsmani, or Elsman's whipnose, is a species of marine ray-finned fish belonging to the family Gigantactinidae, the whipnose anglers. This species is found in the deeper waters of the Atlantic and Pacific Oceans.

== Taxonomy ==
Gigantactis elsmani was first formally described in 1981 by Erik Bertelsen, Theodore W. Pietsch and Robert J. Lavenberg with its type locality given as the South Atlantic at 10°57'S, 11°20'W, Walther Herwig station 459/71, from a depth of 0–1,900 m (0–6,234 ft). This species is placed within the genus Gigantactis which the 5th edition of Fishes of the World classifies within the family Gigantactinidae, a family within the suborder Ceratioidei, the deep sea anglerfishes of the order Lophiiformes, the anglerfishes.

== Etymology ==
Gigantactis elsmani is a member of the genus Gigantactis, the name of which is a combination of gigantos, meaning "giant", with either ἀκτίς ("ray"), or tactis ("toucher", as in tactile), an allusion to the unusually long illicium of the genus's type species, G. vanhoeffeni, shared with this species. The specific name honours Kai L. Elsman, who illustrated the review of the whipnose anglers the species was first described in.

== Description ==
Gigantactis elsmani has relatively large metamorphosed females, which are black and have a comparatively short illicium, which has a length equivalent to 93-126% of the fish's standard length. It does not have an elongated bulb on the esca, which has a single filamentous appendage on its base and two near its tip. There are no papillae on the bulb of the esca. There is no cluster of white filaments at the base of the illicium. There are 5 soft rays in the dorsal fin and 4 or 5 in the anal fin. The teeth on the dentary are comparatively short and arranged in 5 or 6 rows. This species has a maximum published standard length of 43.5 cm (17.1 in).

== Distribution and habitat ==
Gigantactis elsmani has been recorded in the southern Atlantic and Pacific oceans, where it has been reported to occur from the surface down to depths of 3,000 m (9,800 ft).
