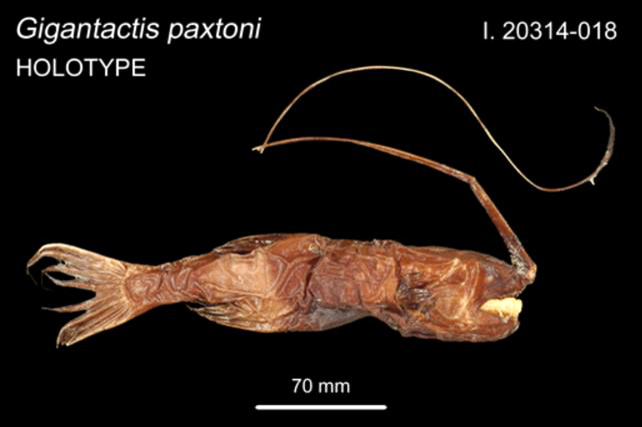

Conservation status
- Least Concern (IUCN 3.1)

Scientific classification
- Kingdom: Animalia
- Phylum: Chordata
- Class: Actinopterygii
- Order: Lophiiformes
- Family: Gigantactinidae
- Genus: Gigantactis
- Species: G. paxtoni

Binomial name
- Gigantactis paxtoni Bertelsen, Pietsch & Lavenberg, 1981

= Gigantactis paxtoni =

Species of fish

Holotype site: 100 km east of Broken Bay'"`UNIQ--ref-0000000B-QINU`"'

Gigantactis paxtoni, Paxton's whipnose or slender anglerfish, is a species of marine ray-finned fish belonging to the family Gigantactinidae, the whipnose anglers. This species is found in the deeper waters of the southern Indo-Pacific.

== Taxonomy ==
Gigantactis paxtoni was first formally described in 1981 by Erik Bertelsen, Theodore W. Pietsch and Robert J. Lavenberg, with its type locality given as 100 km (62 mi) east of Broken Bay off New South Wales at 33°28'S, 152°33'E from a depth of 0 to 900 m (0 to 2,953 ft), where the sea bed was at a depth of 4,200 m (13,800 ft). This species is placed in the genus Gigantactis, which the 5th edition of Fishes of the World classifies within the family Gigantactinidae, a family within the suborder Ceratioidei, the deep sea anglerfishes of the order Lophiiformes, the anglerfishes.

== Etymology ==
Gigantactis paxtoni is a member of the genus Giganactis, the name of which is a combination of gigantos, meaning "giant", with actis, which means "ray", an allusion to the unusually long illicium of the genus's type species, G. vanhoeffeni. The specific name honours John Paxton, an ichthyologist at the Australian Museum, who provided the specimens on which Bertelsen, Pietsch and Lavenberg based their description, and for his contributions to the study of the ichthyology of the deep seas.

== Description ==
Gigantactis paxtoni is a black-coloured anglerfish with an extremely long illicium which has a length equivalent to 168% to 198% of the standard length. There is a tuft of white filaments at the illicium's base, with the bulb of the esca tapering towards a dark, conical extension covered in spinules on its tip; the bulb has a length equivalent to between 12% and 28% of the standard length. The long teeth on the dentary are arranged in 3 or 4 rows. There are small, unpigmented papillae and short filaments on the bulb of the esca and its elongation. This species has a maximum published standard length of 29.5 cm (11.6 in).

== Distribution and habitat ==
Gigantactis paxtoni is found in the southern Indian and Pacific Oceans between 33°S and 44°S, as far south as the northern boundary of the Subantarctic Water Mass. It has also been found off eastern Australia and New Zealand, and in the Halmahera Sea. It has been recorded from depths between 540 and 1,500 m (1,770 and 4,920 ft).
