= Rhynchactis microthrix =

Scientific classification
- Domain: Eukaryota
- Kingdom: Animalia
- Phylum: Chordata
- Class: Actinopterygii
- Order: Lophiiformes
- Family: Gigantactinidae
- Genus: Rhynchactis
- Species: R. microthrix

Binomial name
- Rhynchactis microthrix Bertelsen & Pietsch, 1998

Species of fish

Rhynchactis microthrix is a species of whipnose angler only known from the western Indian Ocean where it is found at depths of around 2,250 metres (7,380 ft). This species grows to a length of 11.3 centimetres (4.4 in) SL.
