= Rhynchactis macrothrix =

Scientific classification
- Domain: Eukaryota
- Kingdom: Animalia
- Phylum: Chordata
- Class: Actinopterygii
- Order: Lophiiformes
- Family: Gigantactinidae
- Genus: Rhynchactis
- Species: R. macrothrix

Binomial name
- Rhynchactis macrothrix Bertelsen & Pietsch, 1998

Species of fish

Rhynchactis macrothrix is a species of whipnose angler found in the Atlantic and western Indian Oceans where it is found at depths of around 2,000 metres (6,600 ft). This species grows to a length of 13 centimetres (5.1 in) SL.
