= Kuiterichthys pietschi =

Scientific classification
- Kingdom: Animalia
- Phylum: Chordata
- Class: Actinopterygii
- Order: Lophiiformes
- Family: Antennariidae
- Genus: Kuiterichthys
- Species: K. pietschi

Binomial name
- Kuiterichthys pietschi Arnold, 2013

Species of fish

Kuiterichthys pietschi is a species of fish in the family Antennariidae. It was described in 2013 by Rachel J. Arnold from 20 specimens collected at depths of 60 to 89 m (197 to 292 ft) off New South Wales, Australia. It differs from its congener K. furcipilis in number of fin rays, number of vertebrae, and escal morphology. It is named in honor of Theodore Wells Pietsch.

Kuiterichthys pietschi measure 19–32 mm (0.75–1.26 in) in standard length.
