= Rhynchactis =

Scientific classification
- Kingdom: Animalia
- Phylum: Chordata
- Class: Actinopterygii
- Order: Lophiiformes
- Family: Gigantactinidae
- Genus: Rhynchactis; Regan, 1925

Type species
- Rhynchactis leptonema Regan, 1925
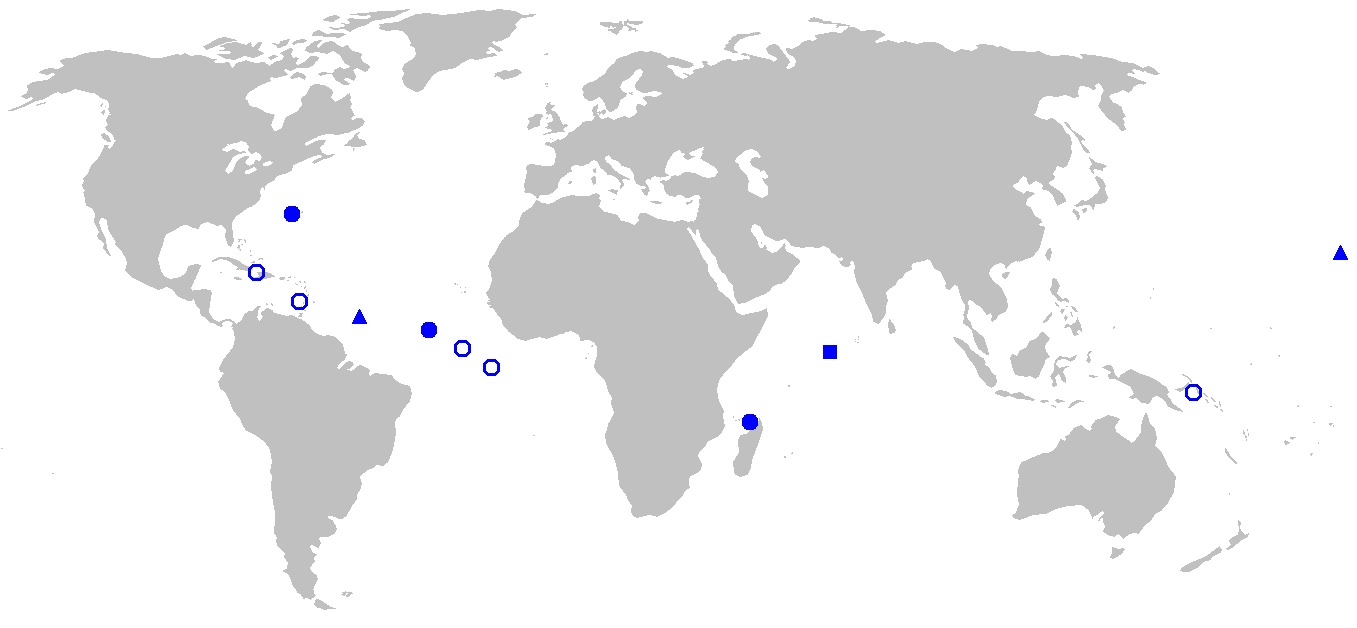
- Occurrences of Rhynchactis (click for key)

Genus of fishes

Rhynchactis is a genus of deep-sea anglerfish in the family Gigantactinidae, containing three species found worldwide at depths greater than 400 m (1,300 ft). Adult female Rhynchactis reach a standard length (SL) of 11–13 cm (4.3–5.1 in) and have a dark-colored, streamlined body and a relatively small head bearing a very long illicium (the "fishing rod" formed by the first ray of the dorsal fin). Unlike almost all other deep-sea anglerfishes, the illicium bears no bioluminescent esca (the "lure") at the tip. The mouth is almost devoid of teeth, and the inside of both jaws are covered by numerous white glands that are unique to this genus.

The lack of an esca, greatly reduced dentition, and glands inside the mouth all point to Rhynchactis having a highly specialized mode of feeding, the nature of which has yet to be deciphered. As in other deep-sea anglerfishes, there is enormous sexual dimorphism with males being much smaller than females and lacking an illicium, though they do not appear to be parasitic as in some families. Reproduction is oviparous, with the larvae having a rounded shape and enlarged pectoral fins.

== Taxonomy and phylogeny ==
British ichthyologist coined the genus Rhynchactis and described its first species, R. leptonema, in a 1925 issue of Annals and Magazine of Natural History. The generic name comes from the Greek rhynchos ("snout") and aktis ("ray"), while the specific epithet comes from the Greek leptos ("thin") and nema ("thread"). Regan based his account on a single metamorphosed female collected by the research vessel Dana in the western central Atlantic.

In 1998, Erik Bertelsen and Theodore Pietsch published a revision of the genus in the scientific journal Copeia and recognized two new species: R. macrothrix and R. microthrix. These two specific epithets are derived from the Greek makros ("long"), mikros ("small"), and thrix ("hairs"), both referring to characteristics of the illicium. Rhynchatis is the more derived genus in its family, exhibiting the secondary reduction of many morphological elements such as bones, fin rays, and teeth.

== Species ==
There are currently three recognized species in this genus:

- Rhynchactis leptonema Regan, 1925
- Rhynchactis macrothrix Bertelsen & Pietsch, 1998
- Rhynchactis microthrix Bertelsen & Pietsch, 1998

== Distribution and habitat ==
Rhynchactis species have been caught between the latitudes of 32°N and 12°S in all three major oceans. Of the specimens that could be identified to species, the two R. leptonema were caught in the western central Atlantic and from off Hawaii, R. macrothrix has been collected from near Bermuda and Madagascar, and the one R. microthrix was caught in the western Indian Ocean. This genus occurs deeper than 400 m (1,300 ft), to at least 900–1,000 m (3,000–3,300 ft) down.

== Description ==
Like in the related genus Gigantactis, metamorphosed female Rhynchactis are slender and streamlined, with a relatively small head comprising about a quarter of the standard length. The illicium originates at the front of the blunt head and exceeds the length of the body. In contrast to most other deep-sea anglerfishes the illicium does not bear a bioluminescent esca at the tip. The upper jaw extends past the lower; the dentition is greatly reduced, particularly in larger females, consisting of only 0–2 tiny, curved teeth on each side at the tip of the upper jaw, and sometimes also fine teeth in the lower jaw. Uniquely, the inside of both jaws are densely covered by white, papilla-like glands, each containing a short, pigmented tube at the center lined by glandular cells. Compared to Gigantactis, several bones in the skull are reduced or absent. The opercle (gill covering) is also reduced in size, with a forked posterior margin.

There are 17–18 fin rays in each pectoral fin, 3–4 (rarely 5) in the dorsal fin, and 3–4 in the anal fin. The pelvic fins are absent, though unlike in Gigantactis the bones at the base remain. The caudal fin is slightly forked, with 4 rays in the upper half and 5 rays in the lower half. The second and seventh rays are longest, measuring 34–45% of the standard length. The skin is dark brown to black, smooth in small fish and becoming densely covered by tiny spines in females over 11 cm (4.3 in) long. As in other deep-sea anglerfishes, the adult male is much smaller than the female and has no illicium; the eyes are minute while the olfactory organs are highly developed, measuring 8–10% of the standard length.

The species differ from each other as follows:

- R. leptonema The illicium of this species measures 143–158% of the standard length, and entirely lacks filaments. The larger of the two specimens is 11.8 cm (4.6 in) long (SL).
- R. macrothrix The illicium of this species measures 109–144% of the standard length. There are 11–20 relatively long filaments along the distal 28–57% of its length, which are darkly pigmented in the largest fish and may be forked and/or have a tiny swelling at the tip. There are also 3–4 short, unpigmented filaments at the tip of the illicium. The largest known female is 13 cm (5.1 in) long (SL).
- R. microthrix The illicium of this species measures 210% of the standard length, bearing 19 short filaments along the distal 14% of its length and 4 tiny filaments at the tip. The single known specimen is 11.2 cm (4.4 in) long (SL).

== Biology and ecology ==
Without a luminous esca to attract prey or large teeth to secure it, Rhynchactis seems to have evolved a completely novel, and as yet unknown, mode of feeding. Like other anglerfishes, it is oviparous with a distinct larval stage. The larvae have short, stout bodies and highly inflated skin that give them an almost spherical shape; their pectoral fins are very large, measuring about half as long as the standard length. There is no evidence that the males become permanently parasitic on the females.
