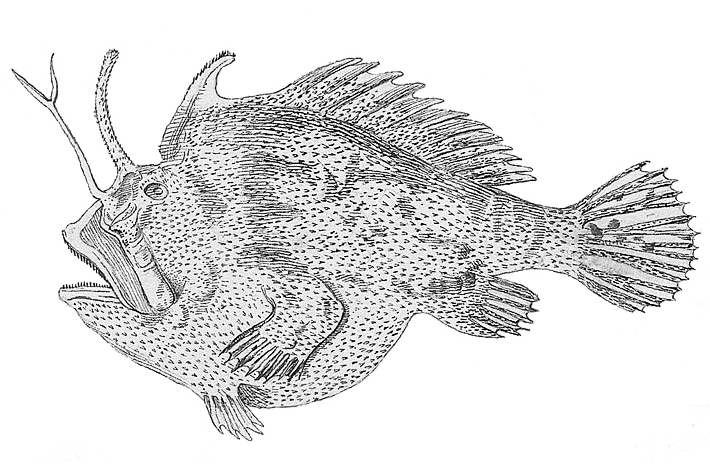
- Kuiterichthys furcipilis

Scientific classification
- Kingdom: Animalia
- Phylum: Chordata
- Class: Actinopterygii
- Order: Lophiiformes
- Family: Antennariidae
- Subfamily: Rhycherinae
- Genus: Kuiterichthys; Pietsch, 1984

Type species
- Chironectes furcipilis Cuvier, 1817

= Kuiterichthys =

Genus of fishes

Kuiterichthys is a genus of marine ray-finned fishes belonging to the subfamily Histiophryninae in the family Antennariidae, the frogfishes. These fishes are endemic to Australia.

== Taxonomy ==
Kuiterichthys was first proposed as a monospecific genus in 1984 by the American ichthyologist Theodore Wells Pietsch III with Chironectes furcipilis designated as its type species. C. furcipilis was described by Georges Cuvier in 1817 and its type locality is unknown. Some authorities classify this genus in the subfamily Histiophryninae within the family Antennariidae., while others recognise it as the family Histiophrynidae. However, the 5th edition of Fishes of the World does not recognise subfamilies within the Antennariidae, classifying the family within the suborder Antennarioidei within the order Lophiiformes, the anglerfishes.

== Etymology ==
Kuiterichthys suffixes ichthys, meaning "fish", onto Kuiter, honouring the underwater photographer Rudie Hermann Kuiter in recognition of his contributions to the ichthyology of Australia.

== Species ==
Kuiterichthys contains the following two recognised species:

- Kuiterichthys furcipilis (Cuvier, 1817) (Rough anglerfish)
- Kuiterichthys pietschi Arnold, 2013

== Description ==
Kuiterichthys anglerfishes have the second and third dorsal spines free of the skin and not hidden underneath it. The rough skin is densely covered in denticles. there is a caudal peduncle and the rearmost margins of the dorsal and anal fins are attached to the caudal peduncle in front of the base of the caudal fin. The illicium is naked, lacking any dermal denticles, the esca, or lure, is distinct and is made up of a number of filamentous appendages.

== Distribution ==
Kuiterichthys are endemic to southern Australia being distributed from off Yamba, New South Wales in New South Wales south and west to off Esperance, Western Australia, including around Tasmania.
