= Rhynchactis leptonema =

Conservation status
- Least Concern (IUCN 3.1)

Scientific classification
- Kingdom: Animalia
- Phylum: Chordata
- Class: Actinopterygii
- Order: Lophiiformes
- Family: Gigantactinidae
- Genus: Rhynchactis
- Species: R. leptonema

Binomial name
- Rhynchactis leptonema Regan, 1925

Species of fish

Rhynchactis leptonema is a species of marine ray-finned fish belonging to the family Gigantactinidae, the whipnose anglers. This species is known from widely scattered locations in the Atlantic and Pacific Oceans.

== Taxonomy ==
Rhynchactis leptonema was first formally described in 1925 by the English ichthyologist Charles Tate Regan with its type locality given as the western central Atlantic at 8°19'N, 44°35'W from a depth of around 1,500 m (4,900 ft). When Regan described this species, he proposed a new monospecific genus Rhynchactis, so this species is the type species of that genus by monotypy. The genus Rhynchactis is one of two genera in the family Gigantactinidae that the 5th edition of Fishes of the World classifies within the suborder Ceratioidei, the deep sea anglerfishes of the order Lophiiformes, the anglerfishes.

== Etymology ==
Rhynchactis leptonema is a member of the genus Rhynchactis, the name of which is a combination of rhynchos, meaning "snout", with actis, which means "ray", an allusion to the illicium originating at the tip of the snout. The specific name, leptonema, means "slender thread", a reference to the long and thin illicium.

== Description ==
Rhynchactis leptonema has metamorphosed females that are slender and streamlined, with a relatively small head comprising about a quarter of the standard length. The illicium originates at the front of the blunt head and exceeds the length of the body. In this species, the illicium has a length equivalent to 118% to 187% of the standard length of the fish. In contrast to most other deep-sea anglerfishes, the illicium does not bear a bioluminescent esca at the tip. The upper jaw extends past the lower; the dentition is greatly reduced, particularly in larger females, consisting of only 0–2 tiny, curved teeth on each side at the tip of the upper jaw, and sometimes also fine teeth in the lower jaw. Uniquely, the inside of both jaws are densely covered by white, papilla-like glands, each containing a short, pigmented tube at the center lined by glandular cells. The maximum published total length is 14.1 cm (5.6 in).

== Distribution and habitat ==
Rhynchactis leptonema has been recorded from the western Atlantic and from the Pacific off Hawaii and Taiwan and is known from only five specimens, which were taken at depths between 0 and 1,100 m (3,600 ft).
