= Pietzsch =

Pietzsch is a German surname with the same origin as "Pietsch". Notable people with the surname include:

- Eckehard Pietzsch (born 1939), German volleyball player
- Jochen Pietzsch (born 1963), East German luger
- Wolfgang Pietzsch, German chess grandmaster
