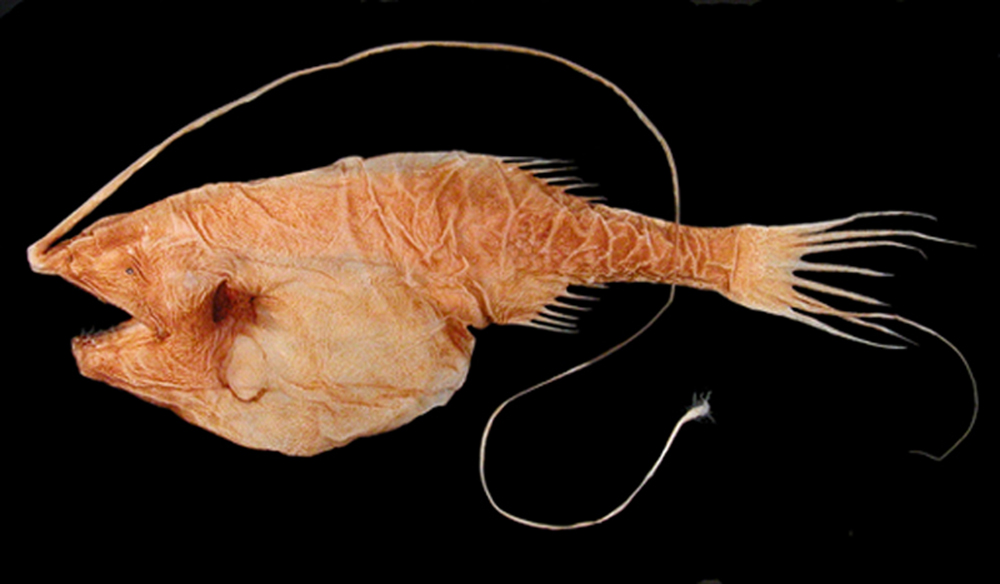
- Gigantactis gargantua
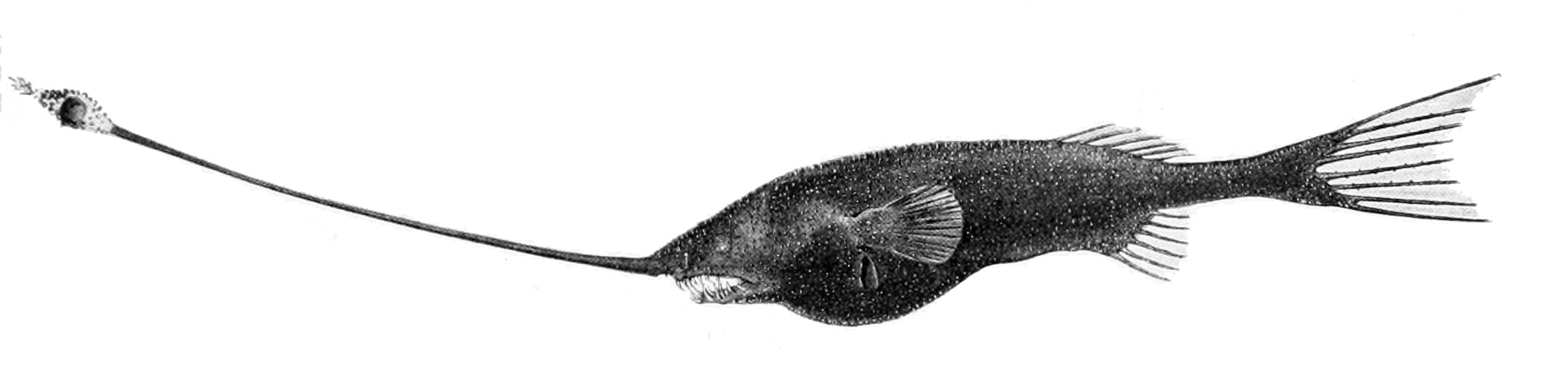
- Gigantactis vanhoeffeni

Scientific classification
- Kingdom: Animalia
- Phylum: Chordata
- Class: Actinopterygii
- Order: Lophiiformes
- Family: Gigantactinidae
- Genus: Gigantactis; A. B. Brauer, 1902

Type species
- Gigantactis vanhoeffeni A. B. Brauer, 1902

Synonyms
- Teleotrema Regan & Trewavas, 1932

= Gigantactis =

Genus of fishes

Gigantactis is a genus of marine ray-finned fish belonging to the family Gigantactinidae, the whipnose anglers. The fishes in this genus have a circumglobal distribution in the deep waters of the tropical and temperate zones of the Atlantic, Indian and Pacific Oceans.

== Taxonomy ==
Gigantactis was first proposed as a monospecific genus in 1902 by the German zoologist August Brauer when he described Gigantactis vanhoeffeni. The type locality of G. vanhoeffeni was given as the Indian Ocean east of Zanzibar from Valdivia station 239 from the surface to a depth of 2,500 m (8,200 ft). This genus was classified in the monotypic family Gigantactinidae in 1904 by the Belgian-born British ichthyologist George Albert Boulenger, with a second genus, Rhynchactis, being added by the English ichthyologist Charles Tate Regan in 1925. The fifth edition of Fishes of the World classifies the whipnose anglers within the suborder Certioidei within the order Lophiiformes, the anglerfishes.

== Etymology ==
Giganactis is a combination of gigantos, meaning "giant", with actis, which means "ray", an allusion to the unusually long illicium of genus's type species, G. vanhoeffeni.

== Species ==
Giganactis contains 22 recognized extant species:

- Gigantactis balushkini Kharin, 1984
- Gigantactis cheni H. C. Ho & K. T. Shao, 2019
- Gigantactis elsmani Bertelsen, Pietsch & Lavenberg, 1981 (Elsman's Whipnose)
- Gigantactis gargantua Bertelsen, Pietsch & Lavenberg, 1981 (Gigantic Whipnose)
- Gigantactis gibbsi Bertelsen, Pietsch & Lavenberg, 1981
- Gigantactis golovani Bertelsen, Pietsch & Lavenberg, 1981
- Gigantactis gracilicauda Regan, 1925
- Gigantactis herwigi Bertelsen, Pietsch & Lavenberg, 1981
- Gigantactis ios Bertelsen, Pietsch & Lavenberg, 1981
- Gigantactis kreffti Bertelsen, Pietsch & Lavenberg, 1981
- Gigantactis longicauda Bertelsen & Pietsch, 2002
- Gigantactis longicirra Waterman, 1939
- Gigantactis macronema Regan, 1925
- Gigantactis meadi Bertelsen, Pietsch & Lavenberg 1981
- Gigantactis microdontis Bertelsen, Pietsch & Lavenberg, 1981
- Gigantactis microphthalmus Regan & Trewavas, 1932
- Gigantactis paresca Rickle, 2024
- Gigantactis paxtoni Bertelsen, Pietsch & Lavenberg, 1981 (Paxton's whipnose)
- Gigantactis perlatus Beebe & Crane, 1947
- Gigantactis savagei Bertelsen, Pietsch & Lavenberg, 1981
- Gigantactis vanhoeffeni A. B. Brauer, 1902 (Cosmopolitan whipnose)
- Gigantactis watermani Bertelsen, Pietsch & Lavenberg, 1981

== Characteristics ==
Gigantactis whipnose anglers are distinguished from the other genus in the family, Rhynchactis, by the absence of pelvic bones and by the possession of between 5 and 9 rays, rarely 4 or 10, in the dorsal fin and the anal fin containing between 5 and 7, rarely 4 or 8, soft rays. In the metamorphosed females, the possession of frontal bones, parietal bones with teeth along their full lengths. The maxilla is reduced to a thread-like remnant, and the dentary has several rows of robust, recurved teeth. They have a single hypohyal and spiny skin. The illicium originates on the tip of the snout, the snout being in front of the mouth, with the esca at its tip bearing a bioluminescent organ. The metamorphosed males have larger eyes than those of Rhynchactis, typically having 12 olfactory lamellae, deep nostrils with a depth greater than 9% of the standard length. They normally have 3 upper denticular teeth and 4 lower denticular teeth, all separate from each other. The skin may be either pigmented or unpigmented and may be naked or covered in spinules. The largest species in the genus is G. vanhoeffeni with a maximum published total length of 62 cm (24 in).

== Distribution and habitat ==
Gigantactis has a circumglobal distribution in the Atlantic, Indian and Pacific Oceans. They are found at depths between the surface and 5,300 m (17,400 ft).

== Feeding mechanism ==
Gigantactis have a very long illicium that is not as mobile as the illicia of other Ceratioid taxa and is vibrated rather than waved; the vibration and bioluminescence of the esca lure the prey. The mouth is used to trap prey in a cage made by the long recurved teeth, which is similar to the wolftrap anglers although, in this genus, the teeth grow from the lower jaw rather than the upper jaw. It is not known how the prey is detected, but the esca and illicium appear to be sensitive and may detect the prey or the pressure waves caused by the prey; the fish then lunges to the prey in its mouth. The prey is then processed by the pharyngeal teeth. Very few specimens have prey in their stomachs when caught, mainly cephalopods with one copepod found.

== Reproduction ==
Gigantactis males are relatively large. They only temporarily attach to much larger females with their pincer-like denticles.
