= Pendry Baltimore =

Historic building in Baltimore, MD

- Front facade, 2015

- Location within Baltimore
- Former names: Sagamore Pendry Baltimore, Recreation Pier

General information
- Architectural style: Beaux Arts
- Location: Baltimore, Maryland, United States
- Coordinates: 39.2816081°N 76.5919536°W
- Current tenants: Pendry Hotels and Resorts
- Completed: 1914
- Renovated: 2017
- Cost: 60 million USD
- Owner: Montage International

Design and construction
- Architect: Theodore Wells Pietsch I

Website
- Official website

Pendry Baltimore is a hotel in the Fells Point neighborhood of Baltimore, Maryland. It was opened in 1914 as the Recreation Pier, a recreational center and shipping pier in the Port of Baltimore. The brick Beaux Arts building fell out of use in the late 20th century, but was renovated and opened as a hotel in 2017.

== History ==
The Recreation Pier was built by the City of Baltimore on the 1700 block of Thames Street at a cost of more than $1 million ($24 million USD today). Designed by Theodore Wells Pietsch I, it combines Georgian Revival and Beaux-Arts elements, including "full-height arched windows behind an arcade of Doric columns" on the second-floor facade. An entrance portal on the ground floor allows pedestrians and vehicles to reach the pier behind the building.

In 1912, the Baltimore Sun praised the planned building, which it said would meet the same success as similar piers in New York and Boston that “furnish a place for mothers and children to get a breath of fresh air [and] for young people to enjoy themselves in innocent, wholesome amusement. In summer a recreation pier is a godsend to the poor housed in ill-ventilated, closely-packed rooms".

Recreation Pier opened on August 20, 1914. The lower floor was used for the harbormaster's office and other commercial purposes, while the upper section was a recreation center, including a large dance hall.

"The pier functioned as both a social center for the local, largely immigrant community and as one of the East Coast’s largest ports of entry for the shipping trade," wrote Lisa Pfueller Davidson and Catherine C. Lavoie for the Society of Architectural Historians. "Modeled after the public piers that appeared in British seaside towns, it included a dance hall and other spaces for social and educational gatherings."

The pier served as a landing point for thousands of immigrants who were carried by ferry across the Patapsco River to the Locust Point immigration station. The ferry would link the Fells Point and Locust Point communities until 1937.

"There were Christmas Eve dances that filled the hall with 400 persons, roller skating, and organized games for young people. Lessons in English were often held at the pier to serve the local immigrant community who hailed from Poland, Ukraine, and Bohemia," wrote historian Mary Zajac.

In 1931, the USS Constitution arrived at the Rec Pier during a three-year tour of U.S. port cities in the wake of an extensive overhaul.

In 1936, the pier hosted the German warship Emden for a 10-day stay during a goodwill tour by the Nazi Party. "Thousands of Baltimoreans streamed to Recreation Pier to get a look at the vessel," a Library of Congress historian later wrote. But another 2,000 or so arrived in a protest march against Nazi Germany, which seven months earlier had passed the antisemitic and racist Nuremberg Laws. "They carried posters condemning repression and human atrocities in Germany," wrote historian Anna Marie Taylor. Curiously, the New York Times reported that the ship docked "without anti-Nazi demonstrations". In any case, the protestors did not dissuade city and state officials from joining in a toast to Adolf Hitler at a reception for the ship's officers sponsored by local German societies, while some 450 Marylanders “enjoyed a shipboard luncheon” on Emden. When it departed, some 2,000 spectators bid the ship and its swastika banners farewell.

From 1945 to 1961, the pier was served by the Bay Belle steamer, which carried thousands of people from the pier to Betterton Beach on the upper Eastern Shore.

Over the years, the building served various roles. It had a rooftop playground for children. A maritime radio station was headquartered within the pier. It was also used as a parking garage. In 1948, the pier was extended by 90 feet to make a headquarters for the Baltimore Harbor Police.

It was renovated again in 1991, a project funded in part by the sale of more than 10,000 engraved bricks that now line the walkways.

=== Restoration and reuse ===
Over the years, many developers tried to transform the pier. Some struggled to find financing for the project because the pier needed so much work. Developers also had to comply with preservation rules and address potential floods.

In 2014, the Sagamore Development firm purchased the property and launched a project to convert the pier and warehouse into a hotel. The project required replacing the pilings driven underwater and into the Baltimore harbor bed. Removal of asbestos cost $250,000; removal of lead paint cost $300,000. The project ultimately required 200,000 worker-hours.

The renovation of the warehouse into a hotel named Sagamore Pendry Baltimore was designed by New York- and Baltimore-based BHC Architects and built by Whiting-Turner, with interiors by Patrick Sutton Design. The building reopened in March 2017.

In September 2025, the hotel was acquired by Montage International and renamed the Pendry Baltimore.

== In fiction ==
The building has served as a set for several film and television productions. From 1993-99, it was the set of the police headquarters for the television series Homicide: Life on the Street. It was the set of the fictional Maryland School for the Arts in the 2006 and 2008 films Step Up and Step Up 2: the Streets.
