= Industrial Building (Baltimore, Maryland) =

- U.S. National Register of Historic Places
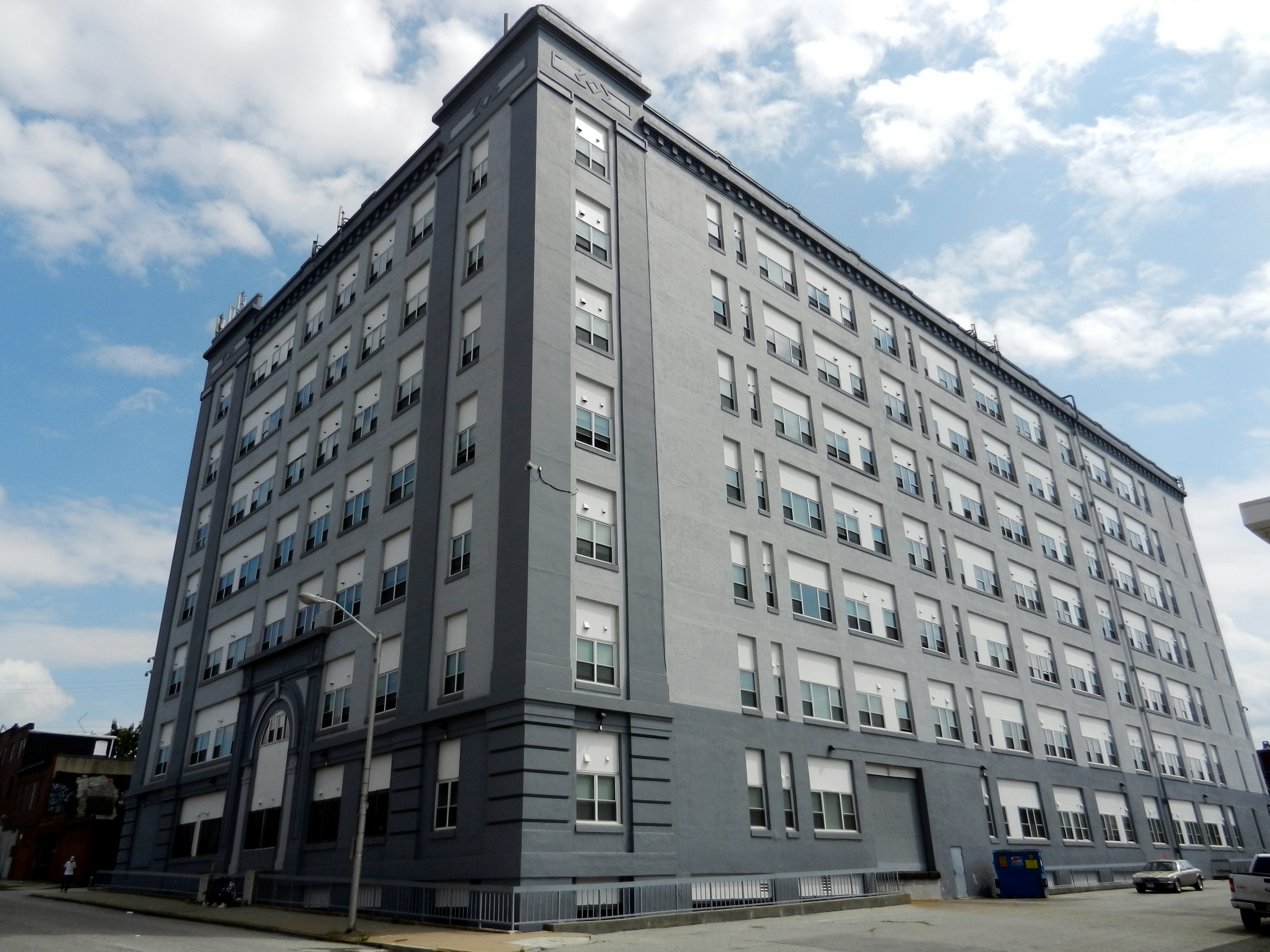
- Industrial Building, September 2012

- Location within Baltimore Location within Maryland Location within the United States
- Location: 501 E. Preston St., Baltimore, Maryland
- Coordinates: 39°18′16″N 76°36′31″W
- Area: 0.8 acres (0.32 ha)
- Built: 1912
- Architect: Pietsch, Theodore Wells; Kielholtz, P.O.
- Architectural style: Chicago, The Commercial Style
- NRHP reference No.: 80001788
- Added to NRHP: March 10, 1980

Industrial Building is a historic factory building located at Baltimore, Maryland, United States. It is a large seven story industrial-style structure built in 1912 and designed by Baltimore architect Theodore Wells Pietsch. It features an "E" plan, reinforced concrete and steel-frame construction, and large pivoted-sash windows. The front façade is characterized by a symmetrical window arrangement and a large 2-story, round-arched entranceway. It was scheduled for conversion to housing for the elderly during the 1980s.

Industrial Building was listed on the National Register of Historic Places in 1980.
