= Vonnie Pietsch =

American politician (born 1936)

Member of the North Dakota House of Representatives from the 22nd district
- In office 2002–2012

Personal details
- Born: January 31, 1936 (age 90) North Dakota, U.S.
- Party: Republican
- Spouse: Bill Pietsch (died 2004)
- Children: four

LaVonne A. Pietsch (née Idso; January 31, 1936) is an American politician. She served as a Republican member for the 22nd district in the North Dakota House of Representatives from 2002 to 2012. She was married to Bill Pietsch, who served in the House from 2000 to 2002.
