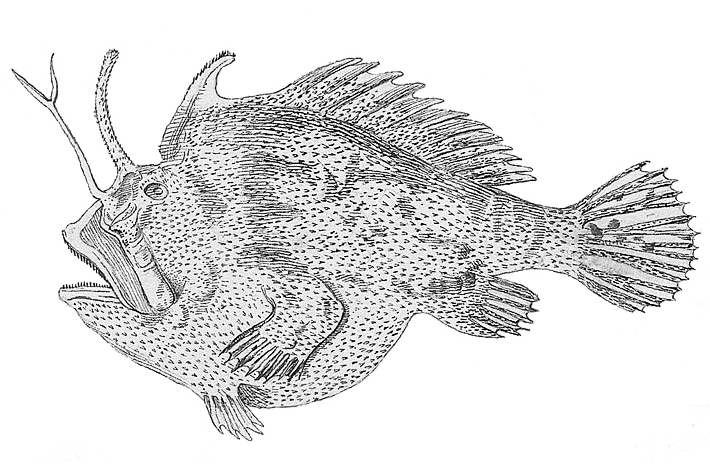

Scientific classification
- Domain: Eukaryota
- Kingdom: Animalia
- Phylum: Chordata
- Class: Actinopterygii
- Order: Lophiiformes
- Family: Antennariidae
- Genus: Kuiterichthys
- Species: K. furcipilis

Binomial name
- Kuiterichthys furcipilis (G. Cuvier, 1817)

Synonyms
- Chironectes furcipilis G. Cuvier, 1817; Trichophryne furcipilis (G. Cuvier, 1817)

= Kuiterichthys furcipilis =

Species of fish

Kuiterichthys furcipilis, the rough anglerfish, is a species of frogfish endemic to the coastal waters of southern Australia and Tasmania. This species inhabits reefs and the ocean floor at depths from 10 to 240 metres (33 to 787 ft). It grows to a length of 15 centimetres (5.9 in) TL.
