= Bill Pietsch =

American businessman and politician

Member of the North Dakota House of Representatives
- In office 2000–2002

Personal details
- Born: March 5, 1935 Casselton, North Dakota, U.S.
- Died: July 15, 2004 (aged 69) Fargo, North Dakota, U.S.
- Party: Republican
- Spouse: Vonnie Pietsch
- Education: North Dakota State University (BA, MA); Washington State University (PhD)

Military service
- Unit: North Dakota Air National Guard

William Herman Pietsch (March 5, 1935 – July 15, 2004) was an American businessman and politician.

== Early life and education ==
Pietsch was born in Casselton, North Dakota and graduated from Lincoln High School in Casselton. He received Bachelor of Arts and Master of Arts degrees from North Dakota State University and his doctorate from the Washington State University. He also attended the University of North Dakota.

== Career ==
Pietsch worked as a business consultant and served in the North Dakota Air National Guard. He served in the North Dakota House of Representatives from 2000 until his resignation on December 16, 2002, because of health problems. He was a Republican.

== Personal life ==
His wife, Vonnie, also served in the North Dakota Legislative Assembly. Pietsch died at the Elm Care Center in Fargo, North Dakota, from a series of strokes.
