= Theodore Wells Pietsch I =

American architect (1868–1930)

Theodore Wells Pietsch
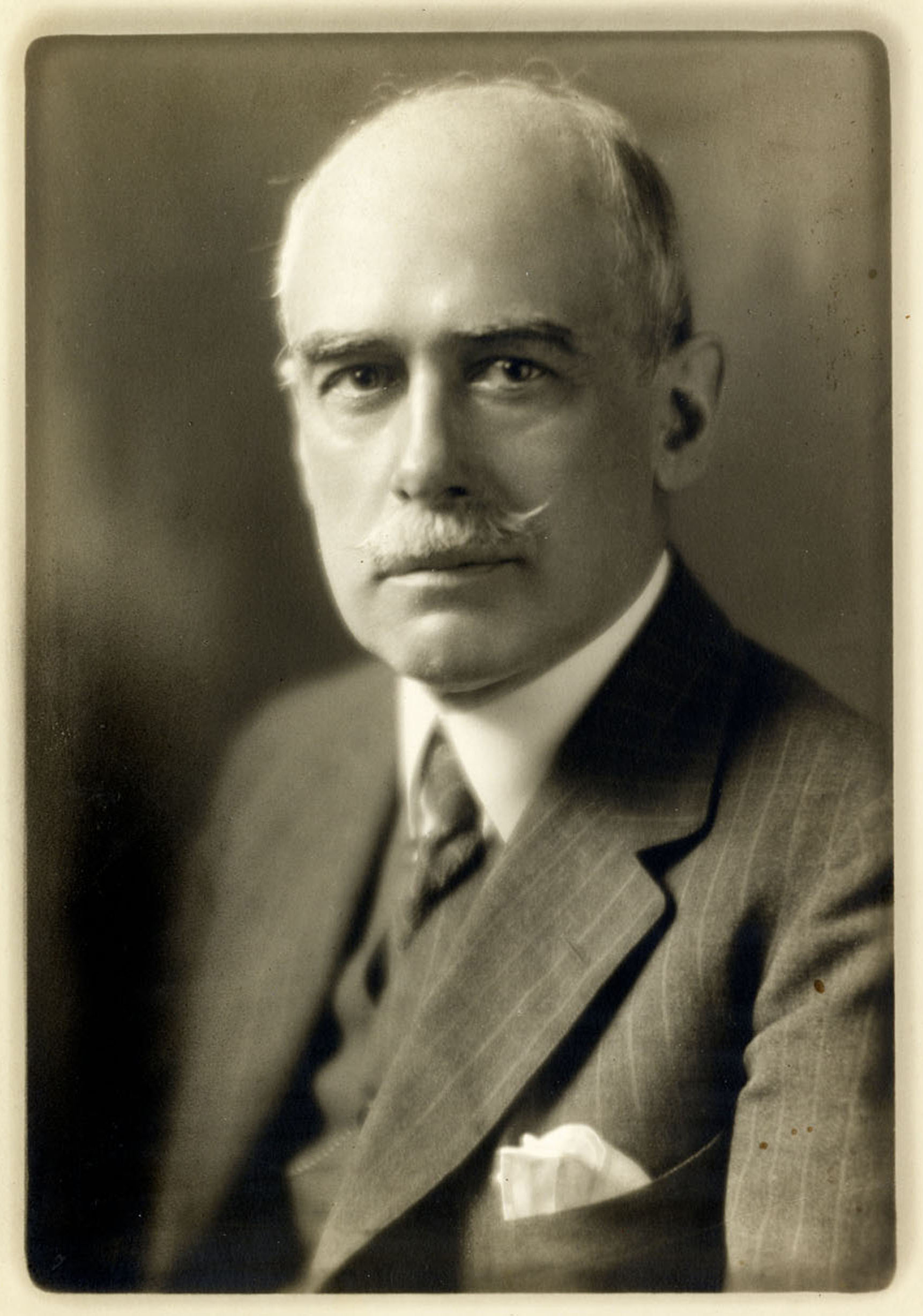
- Theodore Wells Pietsch, about 1925
- Born: October 2, 1868; Chicago, Illinois, U.S.
- Died: January 1, 1930 (aged 61); Baltimore, Maryland, U.S.
- Education: Massachusetts Institute of Technology
- Occupation: Architect
- Children: 3, including Theodore Wells Pietsch II

Theodore Wells Pietsch (October 2, 1868, Chicago, Illinois – January 1, 1930, Baltimore, Maryland) was a well-known American architect, best remembered for a large body of work in and around Baltimore, Maryland. Among his best-known buildings are Recreation Pier at Fell’s Point (now a luxury hotel, the Pendry Baltimore) at 1715 Thames Street, and the SS. Philip and James Catholic Church at 2801 North Charles Street, Baltimore.

== Education and early career ==
After attending the Massachusetts Institute of Technology (1885–1888), he returned to Chicago to begin his career with the architectural firms of Flanders & Zimmerman and of Burnham & Root, both of Chicago. On September 12, 1891, he left the U.S. for Paris and spent the next six years studying at the École Nationale Supérieure des Beaux-arts where he received the French Government Diploma for architecture in December 1897, the ninth American to receive this award. In 1898, he received an honorary mention in the Salon, the official art exhibition of the Académie des Beaux-Arts in Paris.

After returning to the U.S. in 1898, he spent two years in New York City offices, with competitive work, followed by three or four years in Washington, D.C., where for more than a year he was in the employ of Messrs. Hornblower & Marshall, and after that, for some two years, as Designer in the Office of the Supervising Architect Mr. James Knox Taylor.

== Mid- and late career ==
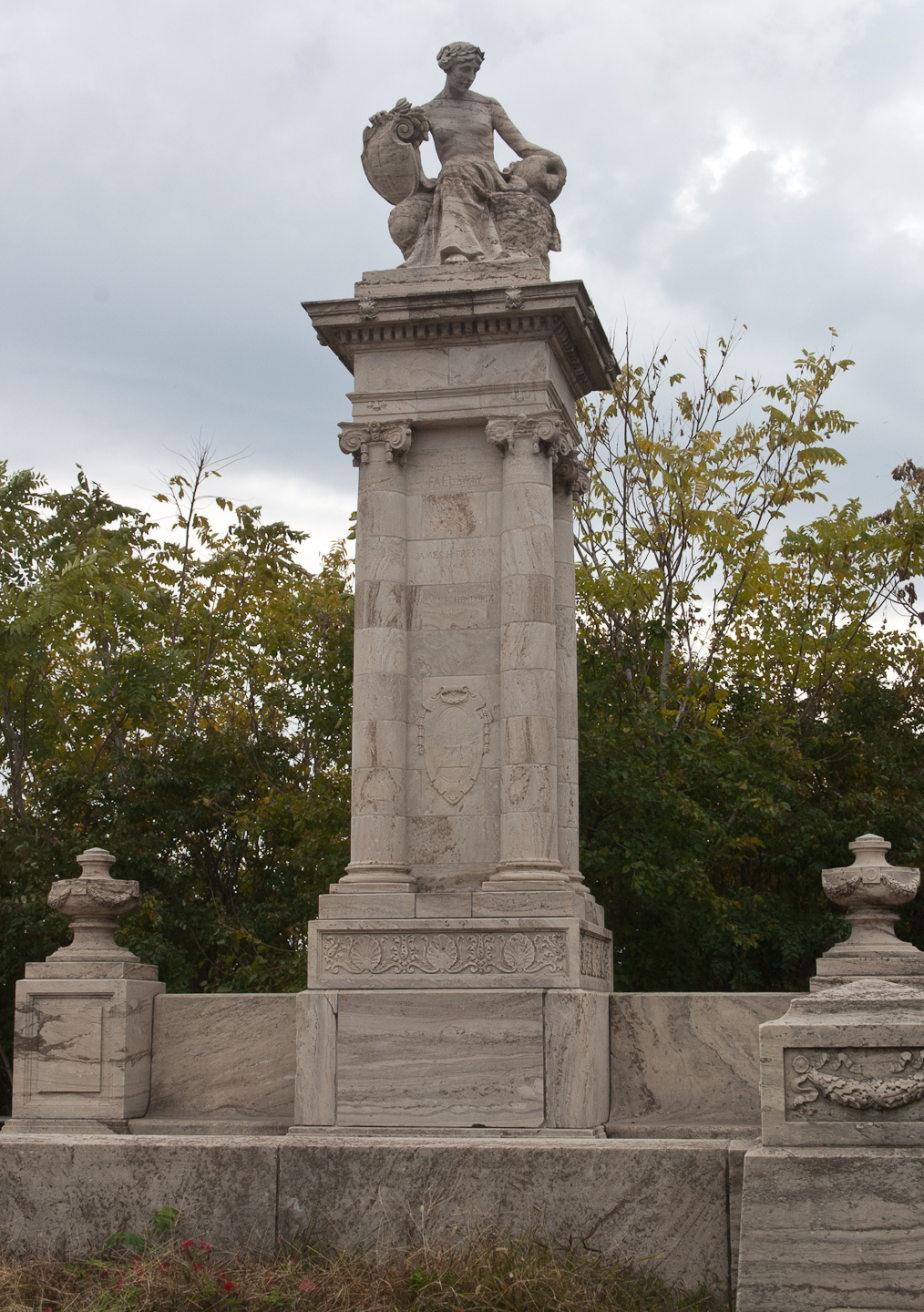
The Fallsway Fountain designed by T. W. Pietsch, with sculpture by Hans Schuler, erected 1915.

When the Great Baltimore Fire occurred in February 1904, he was called to help rebuild the city, where, in that same year, he entered into partnership with Otto G. Simonson (1862–1922), establishing the firm of Simonson and Pietsch, which lasted until 1908. His principle works in Baltimore include:

- the SS. Philip and James Catholic Church, 2801 North Charles Street, Baltimore, a cruciform edifice of Roman classic design, constructed of Indiana limestone, completed in 1930
- Broadway Pier (the City Pier or "Recreation Pier," located on Thames Street between Broadway and Ann Street, which opened on August 20, 1914; built by the city at a cost of over $1 million as a commercial pier with community facilities, including a ballroom, on the top floor)
- the American Building
- Eastern High School
- the Public Market
- the U.S. Fidelity & Guarantee Building
- the Lanahan Warehouse
- the Tin Decorating Company plant
- the Industrial Building
- the Sonneborn Building
- the Fallsway Viaduct
- Parish Hall and Tower of Zion Church (1913)
- the Association of Commerce Building
- Jackson Place School
- the residence of Dr. Ernest G. Marr, 5 Blythewood Road (1928)
- the facades of numerous motion picture theaters (e.g., the Elektra, the New Wilson, and Excelsior),

Works outside Baltimore include Ellicott City High School and the Warden's residence, Maryland House of Correction in Jessup, Maryland.

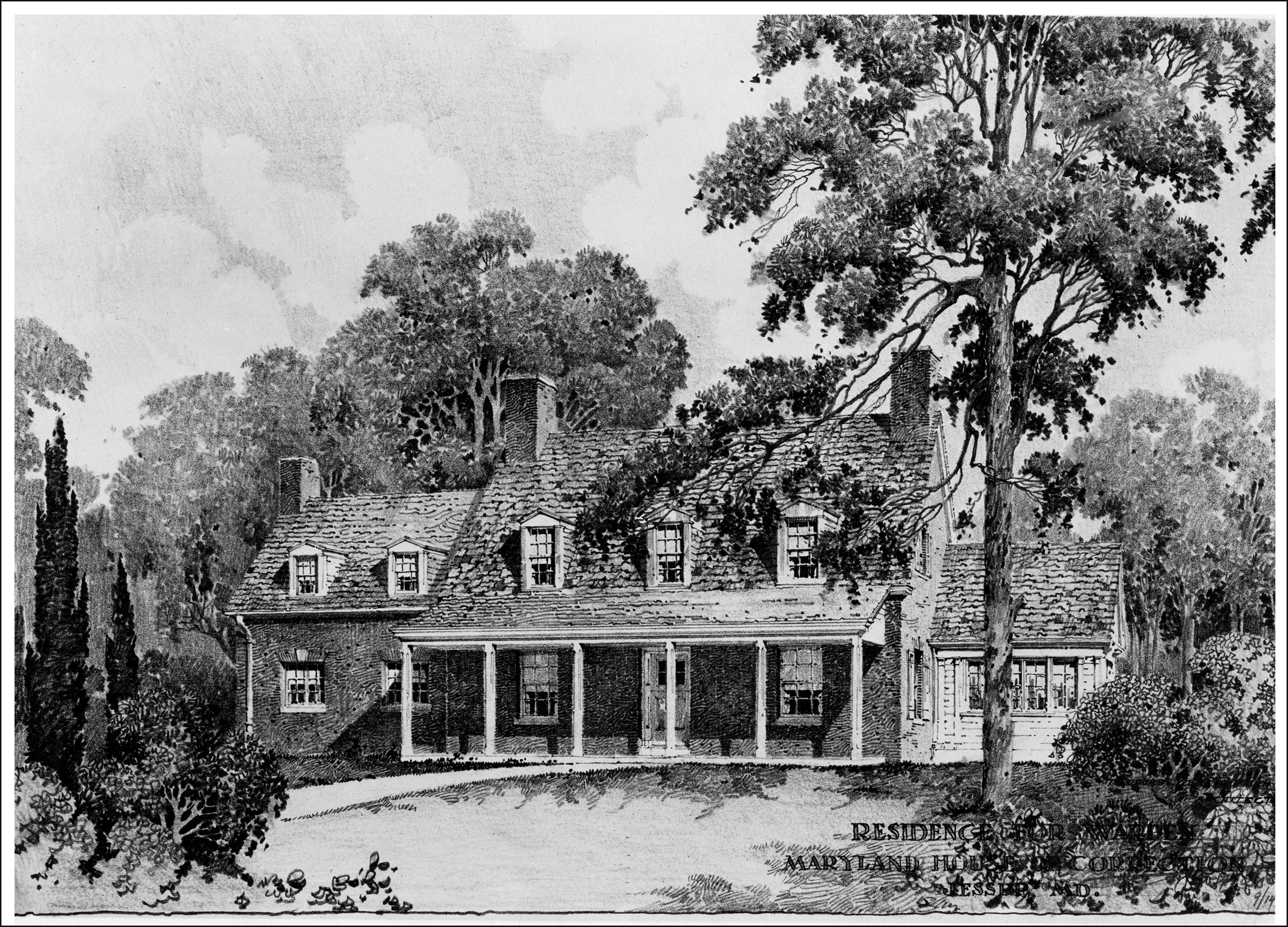
Warden's residence, Maryland House of Correction, Jessup, Maryland, designed and drawn by T. W. Pietsch, September 1914

== Personal life ==
He became a citizen and resident of the State of Maryland on October 27, 1908, at which time he gave his address as "Mt. Royal Apts." Fluent in French, he served in 1917–1918 as an instructor in French to officers of the 316th regiment at Camp Meade, Maryland. He was awarded two medals in architecture from the École Nationale Supérieure des Beaux-arts. He was a member of the American Institute of Architects, elected March 10, 1903. His residence was at 27 Wickford Road (later changed to 4327), Roland Park, Baltimore, which he purchased in 1913; his office was at 1210–11 American Building, Baltimore.

On November 7, 1911, Pietsch married Gertrude Carroll Zell (May 2, 1888 – May 5, 1968), with whom he had three sons: Theodore Wells Pietsch, Jr. (September 23, 1912, Baltimore – August 24, 1993, Everett, Washington); John Oliver Carroll Pietsch (July 21, 1914, Baltimore – December 15, 1986, Birmingham, Michigan); Robert Brooke Pietsch (April 28, 1923, Baltimore – October 27, 2013, Neuilly-sur-Seine, France).

On the morning of January 1, 1930, he committed suicide in his studio behind the Wickford Road house, apparently due to worry over ill health and financial losses in the 1929 stock market crash. He was initially buried at New Cathedral Cemetery, Baltimore, but disinterred on October 6, 2021, and reburied at Graceland Cemetery, Chicago, in the old Pietsch family lot, next to his father, stepmother, brothers, and other family members.
