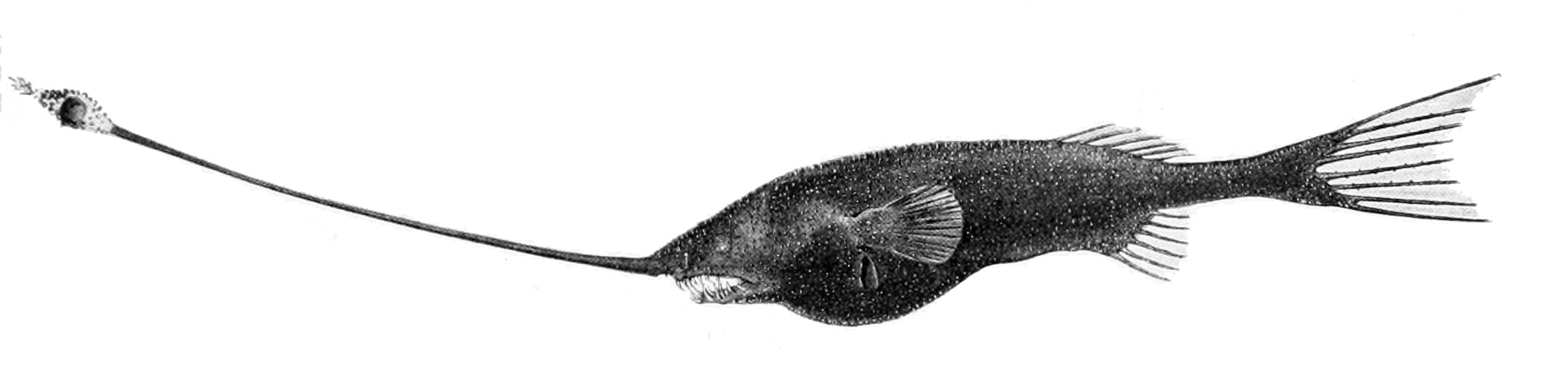

Conservation status
- Data Deficient (IUCN 3.1)

Scientific classification
- Kingdom: Animalia
- Phylum: Chordata
- Class: Actinopterygii
- Division: Teleostei
- Order: Lophiiformes
- Family: Gigantactinidae
- Genus: Gigantactis
- Species: G. vanhoeffeni

Binomial name
- Gigantactis vanhoeffeni Brauer, 1902

Synonyms
- Gigantactis exodon Regan & Trewavas, 1932

= Gigantactis vanhoeffeni =

Species of fish

The cosmopolitan whipnose (Gigantactis vanhoeffeni) is a species of marine ray-finned fish belonging to the family Gigantactinidae, the whipnose anglers. This species has a circumglobal distribution in the deeper waters of the Atlantic, Indian and Pacific Oceans.

== Taxonomy ==
Gigantactis vanhoeffeni was first formally described in 1902 by the German zoologist August Brauer with its type locality given as east of Zanzibar at 5°42'S, 43°36'E in the western Indian Ocean. When he described G. vanhoeffeni Brauer proposed a new monospecific genus, Gigantactis, meaning that this species is the type species of that genus by monotypy. This genus is classified by the 5th edition of Fishes of the World within the family Gigantactinidae, a family within the suborder Ceratioidei, the deep sea anglerfishes of the order Lophiiformes, the anglerfishes.

== Etymology ==
Gigantactis vanhoeffeni is a member of the genus Giganactis, the name of which is a combination of gigantos, meaning "giant", with actis, which means "ray", an allusion to its unusually long illicium. The specific name honours Ernst Vanhöffen, a German zoologist who studied jellyfish on the Valdivia Expedition.

== Description ==
Gigantactis vanhoeffeni has metamorphosed females which are distinguished from other species in the genus by the length of the illicium. The illicium is relatively short with a length equivalent to less than 120% of the standard length of the fish, even shorter in larger individuals. The bulb of the esca has an elongated tip. This elongated tip has a covering of spinules and is darkly pigmented. The bulb and the elongated tip has flattened papillae on their surface. The tip of the escal has short filaments near its tip and thin filaments near its base. The illicium has a pair of filaments near the esca on its rear surface. The long teeth on the dentary are arranged in 3 rows. This species has amaximum published total length of 62 cm (24 in).

== Distribution and habitat ==
Gigantactis vanhoeffeni is found in the tropical and temperate parts of the Atlantic, Indian and Pacific Oceans where it lives at depths between 500 and 5,300 m (1,600 and 17,400 ft). It has reached as far north as Greenland.
