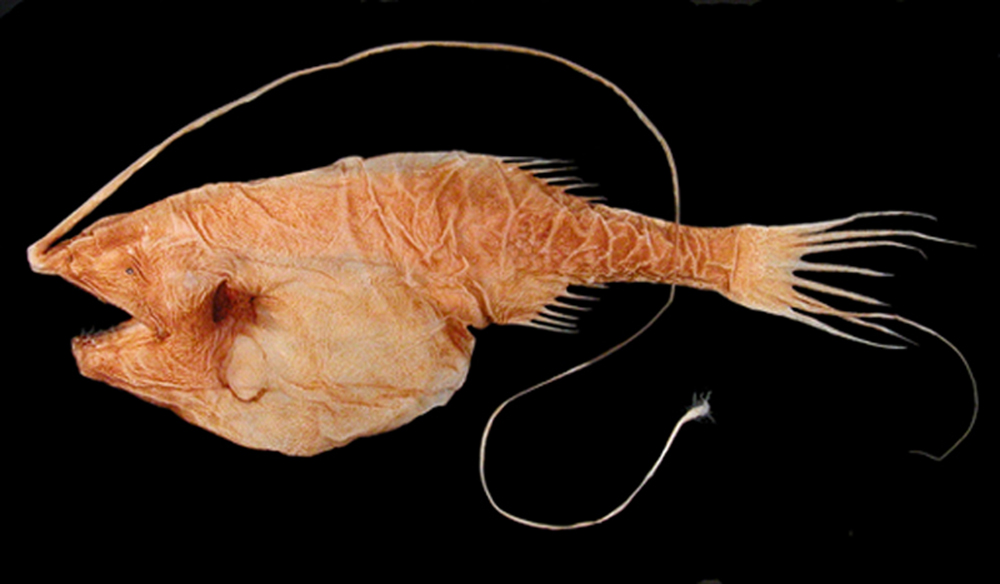
- Preserved specimen of a Gigantactis

Scientific classification
- Kingdom: Animalia
- Phylum: Chordata
- Class: Actinopterygii
- Order: Lophiiformes
- Suborder: Ceratioidei
- Family: Gigantactinidae; Boulenger, 1904

Genera
- see text

= Whipnose angler =

Whipnose Angler

Family of fishes

The whipnose anglers or whipnose seadevils comprise the family Gigantactinidae, marine ray-finned fishes classified within the suborder Ceratioidei, the deep sea anglerfishes. These fishes are found in the Atlantic, Indian and Pacific Oceans.

== Etymology ==
The whipnose angler family name, Gigantactinidae, is derived from Gigantactis, its type genus and the only genus in the family when it was proposed by Boulenger. Gigantactis is a combination of gigantos, meaning "giant", with actis, which means "ray", an allusion to the unusually long illicium of genus's type species, G. vanhoeffeni.

== Taxonomy ==
Whipnose anglers are classified within the family Gigantactinidae, which was proposed as a monotypic family in 1904 by the Belgian-born British ichthyologist George Albert Boulenger for the genus Gigantactis. Gigantactis was first proposed as a monospecific genus by the German zoologist August Brauer when he described Gigantactis vanhoeffeni from the Indian Ocean east of Zanzibar on the German Deep Sea Expedition. In 1925 a second genus Rhynchactis was added by the English ichthyologist Charles Tate Regan. The 5th edition of Fishes of the World classifies this family within the suborder Certioidei within the order Lophiiformes, the anglerfishes.

== Genera ==
The whipnose angler family, Gigantactinidae, comprises the following two genera:

- Gigantactis Brauer, 1902 (Whipnose seadevils)
- Rhynchactis Regan, 1925 (Toothless seadevils)

== Characteristics ==
The whipnose anglers are deep sea anglerfishes with elongate bodies which differ from other Ceratioid families by the metamorphosed females having a very long illicium, the pectoral fins containing 5 radials and a long caudal peduncle. The largest species in the family is G. vanhoeffeni with a maximum published total length of 62 cm (24 in). Rhynchactis is unique among ceratioids in that the females possess no teeth within their jaws, and having a presumably novel feeding behavior.

Metamorphosed whipnose angler males have very small eyes and a large olfactory apparatus with the forward nostrils positioned close together opening to the front. The premaxilla is reduced and there are no teeth in the jaws. The denticular teeth are separate with between 3 and 6 on the upper denticular, rarelt 2, and between 4 and 7, rarely 3, on the lower denticular.

== Distribution and habitat ==
Whipnose anglers are found in the tropical and temperate parts of the Atlantic, Indian and Pacific Oceans in the bathypelagic and mesopelagic zones from depths between 0 and 5,300 m (0 and 17,388 ft).

== Biology ==
Whipnose angler males do not appear to be sexual parasites on the females, they appear to continue to grow after metamorphosis despite there being no evidence of feeding following metamorphosis.
