= Theodore Wells Pietsch III =

American zoologist, ichthyologist

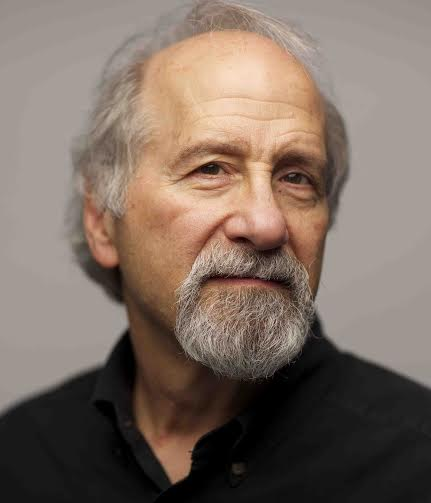
- Theodore Wells Pietsch, 2014
- Born: March 6, 1945 (age 81); Royal Oak, Michigan
- Education: University of Michigan (BA); University of Southern California (MS, PhD)
- Relatives: Theodore Wells Pietsch II (father); Theodore Wells Pietsch I (grandfather)
- Awards: Robert H. Gibbs Jr. Memorial Award
- Scientific career
- Fields: Zoology
- Workplaces: University of Washington, Burke Museum of Natural History and Culture
- Academic advisors: Arnold G. Kluge, Basil G. Nafpaktitis, Karel F. Liem

Theodore Wells Pietsch III (born March 6, 1945) is an American systematist, evolutionary biologist, and historian of science best known for his research on anglerfishes. He is professor emeritus in the School of Aquatic and Fishery Sciences and curator emeritus of fishes at the Burke Museum of Natural History and Culture at the University of Washington in Seattle.

Pietsch has described 72 species and 14 genera of fishes and has authored or edited more than 20 books and over 270 scientific and popular articles on the relationships, evolutionary history, and functional morphology of teleosts, particularly deep sea taxa. For this body of work, Pietsch was awarded the Robert H. Gibbs Jr. Memorial Award in Systematic Ichthyology by the American Society of Ichthyologists and Herpetologists in 2005. His zoological author abbreviation is Pietsch.

== Early life and education ==
Pietsch was born in Royal Oak, Michigan, the son of automobile designer Theodore Wells Pietsch II and grandson of Baltimore architect Theodore Wells Pietsch I. He attended John Adams High School in South Bend, Indiana. As a youth in the Midwest, he raised zebrafish and earthworms to sell to local aquarium and bait shops, which he later credited with leading him toward the biological sciences.

Pietsch earned a Bachelor of Science in zoology from the University of Michigan in 1967, where he initially studied herpetology under Arnold G. Kluge. On Kluge's advice, he pursued graduate study in ichthyology at the University of Southern California, earning a M.S. in biology in 1969 and a Ph.D. in 1973. His dissertation examined the osteology and relationships of ceratioid anglerfishes of the family Oneirodidae. He first encountered bathypelagic anglerfishes in 1967 while sorting specimens aboard a research vessel and later made the group his primary research subject.

== Career ==
After completing his doctorate, Pietsch was a postdoctoral fellow at the Museum of Comparative Zoology at Harvard University from 1973 to 1975, where he worked with Karel F. Liem. He then joined the Department of Biology at California State University, Long Beach, as an assistant professor, teaching there from 1975 to 1978.

In 1978, Pietsch was appointed assistant professor and curator of fishes at the School of Fisheries at the University of Washington. He was promoted to associate professor in 1981 and full professor in 1984, and later held the Dorothy T. Gilbert Professorship in Ocean and Fishery Sciences.

During his tenure, Pietsch directed National Science Foundation and Smithsonian Institution grants that rebuilt the University of Washington Fish Collection, reorganized it in a new building opened in 1990, and cataloged tens of thousands of specimens. These included major holdings of North Pacific fish eggs, larvae, and otoliths transferred from the Alaska Fisheries Science Center. He retired from the University of Washington in July 2015 and was named professor emeritus and curator emeritus of fishes.

In 1989, with Douglas F. Markle of Oregon State University, Pietsch founded the Gilbert Ichthyological Society, a regional society for Pacific Northwest ichthyologists named for well-known ichthyologist Charles Henry Gilbert (1859–1928). He served as president of the American Society of Ichthyologists and Herpetologists in 1996–1997 and hosted the society's annual meeting at the University of Washington in June 1997.

== Research ==
=== Anglerfishes ===
Pietsch is widely regarded as a leading authority on the systematics of anglerfishes. His doctoral research reduced roughly 400 previously named oneirodid species to about 130 valid taxa, and he continued revising the classification of shallow-water frogfishes and deep sea ceratioids for more than five decades.

His work on sexual parasitism in deep-sea anglerfishes has drawn broad scientific and public attention. In this reproductive strategy, a tiny dwarf male permanently attaches to and fuses with a much larger female. Pietsch's morphological and phylogenetic analyses showed that this mode of reproduction evolved independently as many as five times within Ceratioidei. In 2020, he co-authored a study with Thomas Boehm and colleagues showing that ceratioid anglerfishes have lost major elements of the adaptive immune system, allowing male and female tissues to fuse without rejection.

In 2009, Pietsch, Rachel J. Arnold, and David J. Hall described the Psychedelic Frogfish, Histiophryne psychedelica, from waters off Ambon, Indonesia. The species is notable for its swirling, fingerprint-like pigment pattern and hopping locomotion. In 2018, Pietsch served as a scientific commentator on the first recorded observation of a live fanfin seadevil pair, Caulophryne jordani, filmed by the Rebikoff-Niggeler Foundation near the Azores.

=== International Kuril Island Project ===
From 1994 to 2000, Pietsch led the International Kuril Island Project, a National Science Foundation-funded biotic survey and inventory of the Kuril Islands conducted with the Russian Academy of Sciences and Hokkaido University. Over seven summer expeditions, international teams surveyed the flora and fauna of all 30 major islands in the archipelago, sampling more than 6,580 sites and collecting over 335,000 specimens.

The program expanded to Sakhalin in 2001 under the name Okhotskia and produced more than 150 scientific publications. Pietsch also led a two-year survey of the flora and fauna of the Elwha River Valley on Washington state’s Olympic Peninsula.

=== History of science ===
Beginning in the early 1980s, Pietsch developed a parallel career as a historian of natural history. He has published books and monographs on Georges Cuvier and the 22-volume Histoire naturelle des poissons; on the eighteenth-century bookdealer, publisher, and secret agent Louis Renard and his Fishes, Crayfishes, and Crabs; on the unpublished manuscripts and drawings of French explorer-naturalist Charles Plumier; and on the Indo-Pacific fish paintings of Isaac Johannes Lamotius.

Pietsch also produced annotated English translations of the first four volumes of Cuvier's five-volume Histoire des Sciences Naturelles, published by the Muséum national d'Histoire naturelle in Paris in 2012, 2015, 2018, and 2023. The work on the fifth and final volume has been completed and accepted for publication.

In 2010, he published The Curious Death of Peter Artedi: A Mystery in the History of Science, a novelized reconstruction of the 1735 drowning of Swedish ichthyologist Peter Artedi in an Amsterdam canal. The book was based on primary archival research into Artedi's relationship with Carl Linnaeus. A Swedish translation, Hur dog Peter Artedi?, was published in 2023.

With William D. Anderson Jr., Pietsch co-authored Ichthyopedia: A Biographical Dictionary of Ichthyologists, published by the American Philosophical Society in 2022. The work contains about 1,500 biographical sketches of deceased ichthyologists from antiquity to the twenty-first century.

== Awards and recognition ==
Pietsch received the Robert H. Gibbs Jr. Memorial Award in Systematic Ichthyology from the American Society of Ichthyologists and Herpetologists in 2005 for his body of systematic work on fishes. He received the ASIH Meritorious Teaching Award in Ichthyology in 2017, the Robert K. Johnson Award for Excellence in Service in 2018, and the Joseph S. Nelson Lifetime Achievement Award in Ichthyology in 2024. In 2022, the Society for the History of Natural History awarded him its Founders' Medal for his contributions to the history of natural history.

Pietsch is a fellow of the California Academy of Sciences, the Linnean Society of London, the American Association for the Advancement of Science, and the University of Washington Teaching Academy. He is also an honorary member of the Ichthyological Society of Japan, and the Russian Hydrobiological Society of the Russian Academy of Sciences.

Several taxa have been named in his honor, including the coelenterate parasite Hydrichthys pietschi; the cottid Icelinus pietschi; the caristiid Platyberyx pietschi; the myrocongrid eel Myroconger pietschi; the fossil percomorph family Pietschellidae and the genus and species Pietschellus aenigmaticus; and the anglerfishes Caulophryne pietschi, Kuiterichthys pietschi, Oneirodes pietschi, Oneirodes parapietschi, and Pietschichthys horridus.

== Selected bibliography ==
- 1985. The manuscript materials for the Histoire Naturelle des Poissons, 1828−1849: Sources for understanding the fishes described by Cuvier and Valenciennes. Arch. Nat. Hist., 12(1): 59−108.
- 1987. Frogfishes of the World: Systematics, Zoogeography, and Behavioral Ecology. Stanford University Press, Stanford, California, xxii + 420 pp. (with David B. Grobecker).
- 1995. Historical Portrait of the Progress of Ichthyology, from Its Origins to Our Own Time. Edited and annotated by T. W. Pietsch, translated from the French by A. J. Simpson. Johns Hopkins University Press, Baltimore, xxiv + 366 pp., 67 figures.
- 1995. Fishes, Crayfishes, and Crabs: Louis Renard and His Natural History of the Rarest Curiosities of the Seas of the Indies. Johns Hopkins University Press, Baltimore, Vol. 1, Commentary, xxii + 214 pp., 95 figures; Vol. 2, Facsimile, 224 pp., 100 color pls.
- 1997. Collection Building in Ichthyology and Herpetology. Amer. Soc. Ichthy. Herp., Spec. Publ., 3, xiii + 593 pp. (with W. D. Anderson, Jr.).
- 2006. Les Planches inédites de Poissons et autres Animaux marins de l'Indo-Ouest Pacifique d'Isaac Johannes Lamotius [Isaac Johannes Lamotius (1646−c. 1718) and His Paintings of Indo-Pacific Fishes and Other Marine Animals]. Christian Érard (editor), Publications Scientifiques du Muséum and Bibliothèque Centrale, Muséum National d'Histoire Naturelle, Paris, 292 pp., 93 color pls. (with L. B. Holthuis).
- 2008. A Mermaid in the Tub: A Specimen of MvB Sirenne, a New Family of Type-Faces by Alan Greene, Inspired by Engraved Letterforms in a Rare Book. Mark van Bronkhorst and E. M. Ginger, editors, MvB Fonts, Albany, California, 36 pp.
- 2009. Oceanic Anglerfishes: Extraordinary Diversity in the Deep-sea. University of California Press, Berkeley and Los Angeles, xii + 557 pp.
- 2010. The Curious Death of Peter Artedi: A Mystery in the History of Science. Scott & Nix, New York, x + 224 pp.
- 2012. Trees of Life: A Visual History of Evolution. Johns Hopkins University Press, Baltimore, xi + 358 pp.
- 2012. Cuvier's History of the Natural Sciences: Twenty-four Lessons from Antiquity to the Renaissance [the first of Georges Cuvier's five-volume Histoire des Sciences Naturelles, depuis leur Origine jusqu'a nos Jours, originally published in French from 1841 to 1845]. Edited and annotated by T. W. Pietsch, translated from the French by A. J. Simpson. Publications Scientifiques du Muséum and Bibliothèque Centrale, Muséum national d'Histoire naturelle, Paris, 734 pp.
- 2015. Cuvier's History of the Natural Sciences: Nineteen Lessons from the Sixteenth and Seventeenth Centuries [the second of Georges Cuvier's five-volume Histoire des Sciences Naturelles, depuis leur Origine jusqu'a nos Jours, originally published in French from 1841 to 1845]. Edited and annotated by T. W. Pietsch, translated from the French by B. D. Marx. Publications Scientifiques du Muséum and Bibliothèque Centrale, Muséum national d'Histoire naturelle, Paris, 859 pp.
- 2017. Charles Plumier (1646–1704) and His Drawings of French and Caribbean Fishes, Publications Scientifiques du Muséum and Bibliothèque Centrale, Muséum national d'Histoire naturelle, Paris, 408 pp., 121 pls.
- 2018. Cuvier's History of the Natural Sciences: Twenty Lessons from the First Half of the Eighteenth Century [the third of Georges Cuvier's five-volume Histoire des Sciences Naturelles, depuis leur Origine jusqu'a nos Jours, originally published in French from 1841 to 1845]. Edited and annotated by T. W. Pietsch, translated from the French by Fanja Andriamialisoa. Publications Scientifiques du Muséum and Bibliothèque Centrale, Muséum national d'Histoire naturelle, Paris, 576 pp.
- 2019. Fishes of the Salish Sea: Puget Sound and the Straits of Georgia and Juan de Fuca, illustrated by Joseph R. Tomelleri. University of Washington Press, Seattle, 3 vols., 1,048 pp., 260 color pls. (with James W. Orr).
- 2020. Frogfishes: Biodiversity, Zoogeography, and Behavioral Ecology. Johns Hopkins University Press, Baltimore, Maryland, 601 pp., 346 figs. (with Rachel J. Arnold).
- 2020. Georges Cuvier's Historical Portrait of the Progress of Ichthyology, from Its Origins to Our Own Time. Second edition, revised and enlarged, edited and annotated by T. W. Pietsch, translated from the French by A. J. Simpson. Publications Scientifiques du Muséum, Muséum national d'Histoire naturelle, Paris, 672 pp., 149 figs.
- 2023. Hur dog Peter Artedi? En vetenskapshistorisk gåta ["How did Peter Artedi Die? A Scientific Historical Riddle"]. Translated from the English by Hans Aili. Ekström & Garay, Lund, Sweden, 266 pp., 19 figs.
- 2023. Ichthyopedia: A Biographical Dictionary of Ichthyologists. American Philosophical Society, Lightning Rod Press, Volume 10, xiv + 303 pp., 255 figs.
- 2023. Cuvier's History of the Natural Sciences: The Eighteenth Century. [the fourth of Georges Cuvier’s five-volume Histoire des Sciences Naturelles, depuis leur Origine jusqu'a nos Jours, originally published in French in 1843]. Edited and annotated by T. W. Pietsch, foreword by Stéphane Schmitt, translated by Fanja Andriamialisoa. Publications Scientifiques du Muséum, Muséum national d'Histoire naturelle, Paris, 622 pp., 60 figs.
- 2023. Field Guide to Fishes of the Salish Sea: Puget Sound and the Straits of Georgia and Juan de Fuca, illustrated by Joseph R. Tomelleri. Chatwin Books, Seattle, 347 pp., 270 color figs. (with James W. Orr).
- 2024. Peter Artedi: Reformer of Eighteenth-Century Zoology. Volume 1, Peter Artedi's Life and Works, With Latin Editions and English Translations of "Catalogus Piscium Maris Baltici," "Manuscriptum Ichthyologicum, quod Petrus Artedi Elaboravit in Usum Thesauri Sebani," and "Idea Institutionum Trichozoologiae." Studia Latina Stockholmiensia series, Stockholm University Press, Stockholm, Sweden, 421 pp., 24 figs. (with Hans Aili).
- 2025. Peter Artedi: Reformer of Eighteenth-Century Zoology. Volume 2, Peter Artedi's Ichthyologia, sive Opera Omnia Piscibus, 1738. Studia Latina Stockholmiensia series, Stockholm University Press, Stockholm, Sweden, 532 pp., 10 figs. (with Hans Aili).

== See also ==
- Taxa named by Theodore Wells Pietsch III.
