= Lasiognathus intermedius =

Conservation status
- Least Concern (IUCN 3.1)

Scientific classification
- Kingdom: Animalia
- Phylum: Chordata
- Class: Actinopterygii
- Order: Lophiiformes
- Family: Oneirodidae
- Genus: Lasiognathus
- Species: L. intermedius

Binomial name
- Lasiognathus intermedius Bertelsen & Pietsch, 1996

Species of fish

Lasiognathus intermedius is a species of marine ray-finned fish belonging to the family Thaumatichthyidae, the wolftrap anglers. This species is known from the deeper waters of the Atlantic and Pacific Oceans.

== Taxonomy ==
Lasiognathus intermedius was first formally described in 1996 by the Danish ichthyologist Erik Bertelsen and the American ichthyologist Theodore Wells Pietsch III with its type locality given as the Florida Current in the Western Atlantic Ocean at 34°18'N, 75°08'W, or 34°32'N, 75°26'W, from a depth between 0 and 1,050 m (0 and 3,445 ft). This species belongs to the genus Lasiognathus which the 5th edition of Fishes of the World classifies within the family Thaumatichthyidae, within the suborder Ceratioidei of the anglerfish order Lophiiformes.

== Etymology ==
Lasiognathus intermedius is a member of the genus Lasiognathus, this name is a combination of lasios, meaning "bearded", and gnathus, which means "jaw". This may be a reference to the many long teeth in the upper jaw, giving the appearance of a beard. The specific name intermedius, means "intermediate", and is an allusion to the morphology of the esca being intermediate between that of L. beebei and those of L. saccostoma and L. waltoni.

== Description ==
Lasiognathus intermedius has its dorsal fin supported by 6 or 7 soft rays while the anal fin contains 4 or 5 soft rays. The bulb of the esca has no membrane-like anterior appendage while the appendage at the tip has a cylindrical stalk with small filaments emerging from the bases of the hooks on the esca, with no filaments or serration on its sides. The rera appendage is flattened towards its tip and is slender at its base. This species has a maximum standard length of 12.9 cm (5.1 in).

== Distribution and habitat ==
Lasiognathus intermedius is found in the Atlantic and Pacific Oceans. In the Western Atlantic it is found from Newfoundland south to South Carolina and Bermuda, while in the south eastern Atlantic it has been recorded from off South Africa and in the Pacific from far offshore in the southeastern Pacific. It has been recorded from depths between 975 and 1,265 m (3,199 and 4,150 ft).
