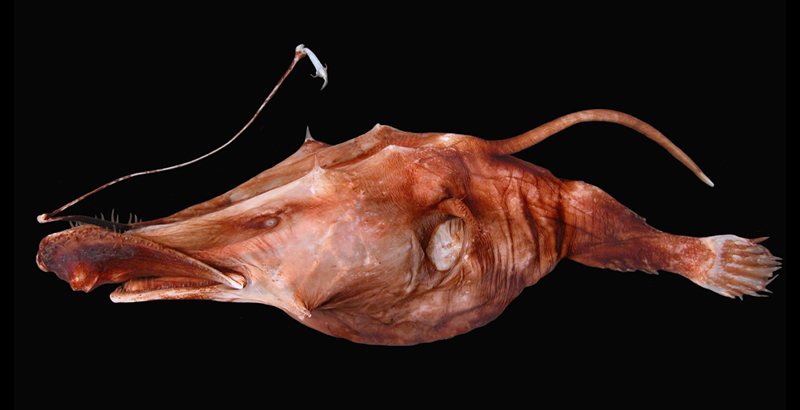

Conservation status
- Data Deficient (IUCN 3.1)

Scientific classification
- Kingdom: Animalia
- Phylum: Chordata
- Class: Actinopterygii
- Order: Lophiiformes
- Family: Oneirodidae
- Genus: Lasiognathus
- Species: L. amphirhamphus

Binomial name
- Lasiognathus amphirhamphus Pietsch, 2005

= Lasiognathus amphirhamphus =

Species of fish

Lasiognathus amphirhamphus is a species of marine ray-finned fish belonging to the family Thaumatichthyidae, the wolftrap anglers. This species was first formally described in 2005 by the American ichthyologist Theodore Wells Pietsch III and is known from a single Zoological specimen, the holotype, collected from the Madeira Abyssal Plain in the east-central Atlantic Ocean where it occurs at a depth of from 1,200 to 1,305 metres (3,937 to 4,281 ft). The holotype, a female, had a standard length of 15.7 cm (6.2 in). This species is characterized by having only two (as opposed to three) bony hooks on its esca, which are lightly pigmented. The distal escal appendage is elongated and cylindrical with a long, compressed prolongation at the tip as in L. saccostoma. The prolongation has six tiny filaments at the tip and no lateral serrations. The posterior escal appendage is broad and laterally compressed. Its species name is from the Greek for "double hook", referring to its escal hooks.
