= Lasiognathus dinema =

Conservation status
- Data Deficient (IUCN 3.1)

Scientific classification
- Kingdom: Animalia
- Phylum: Chordata
- Class: Actinopterygii
- Division: Teleostei
- Order: Lophiiformes
- Family: Oneirodidae
- Genus: Lasiognathus
- Species: L. dinema

Binomial name
- Lasiognathus dinema Pietsch & Sutton (2015)

Species of fish

Lasiognathus dinema is a species of marine ray-finned fish belonging to the family Thaumatichthyidae, the wolftrap anglers. This species is known only from the northern Gulf of Mexico.

== Taxonomy ==
Lasiognathus dinema was first formally described in 2015 by Theodore Wells Pietsch III and Tracey T. Sutton with its type locality given as the northern Gulf of Mexico at 27.5°N, 88.5°W from a depth between 0 and 1,271 m (0 and 4,170 ft), where the seabed was at 2,104 m (6,903 ft). This species belongs to the genus Lasiognathus which the 5th edition of Fishes of the World classifies within the family Thaumatichthyidae, within the suborder Ceratioidei of the anglerfish order Lophiiformes.

== Etymology ==
Lasiognathus dinema is a member of the genus Lasiognathus, this name is a combination of lasios, meaning "bearded", and gnathus, which means "jaw". This may be a reference to the many long teeth in the upper jaw, giving the appearance of a beard. The specific name, dinema, means "two threads", an allusion to te two elongated filaments that emerge from the bases of the hooks on the escal bulb.

== Description ==
Lasiognathus dinema is distinguished from its congeners by the morphology of the esca. This species has an esca which has a cylindrical front appendage with internal pigmentation and a pair of elongated appendages at the tip of the esca. This species has a maximum published standard length of 9.5 cm (3.7 in).

== Features ==
Lasiognathus dinema, a species of deep-sea anglerfish, possesses an elongated, bioluminescent lure used to attract prey in the aphotic zones of the ocean. This adaptation is particularly crucial for survival in its deep-sea habitat, where light is minimal.

== Distribution and habitat ==
Lasiognathus dinema is known from a single location in the northern Gulf of Mexico within a radius of 250 m (820 ft) of the Macondo wellhead where it has been collected from depths between 800 and 1,271 m (2,625 and 4,170 ft).

== Conservation status ==
Lasiognathus dinema is known from only three specimens, all collected in 2011. The type locality is close to the location of the Deepwater Horizon oil spill and the population, range and biology of this species are poorly understood, leading the International Union for Conservation of Nature to classify this species as Data deficient.
