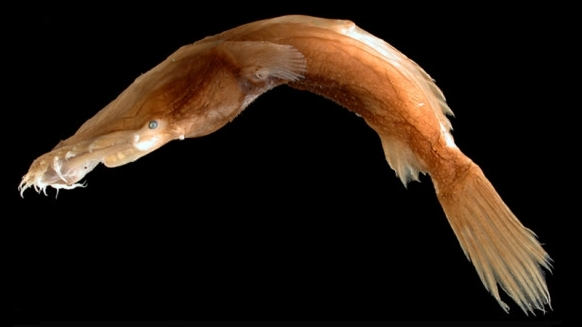

Scientific classification
- Domain: Eukaryota
- Kingdom: Animalia
- Phylum: Chordata
- Class: Actinopterygii
- Order: Lophiiformes
- Family: Thaumatichthyidae
- Genus: Thaumatichthys
- Species: T. binghami

Binomial name
- Thaumatichthys binghami A. E. Parr, 1927

= Thaumatichthys binghami =

Species of fish

Thaumatichthys binghami is a species of wolftrap angler known from the western central Atlantic Ocean, where it occurs at a depth of 2,532 metres (8,307 ft). This species is similar to T. axeli, except that its esca bears 2–3 pairs of lateral lobes that are elongated into tapering filaments in the largest individuals, and the uppermost medial appendage on the esca is finger-like and tapering.
