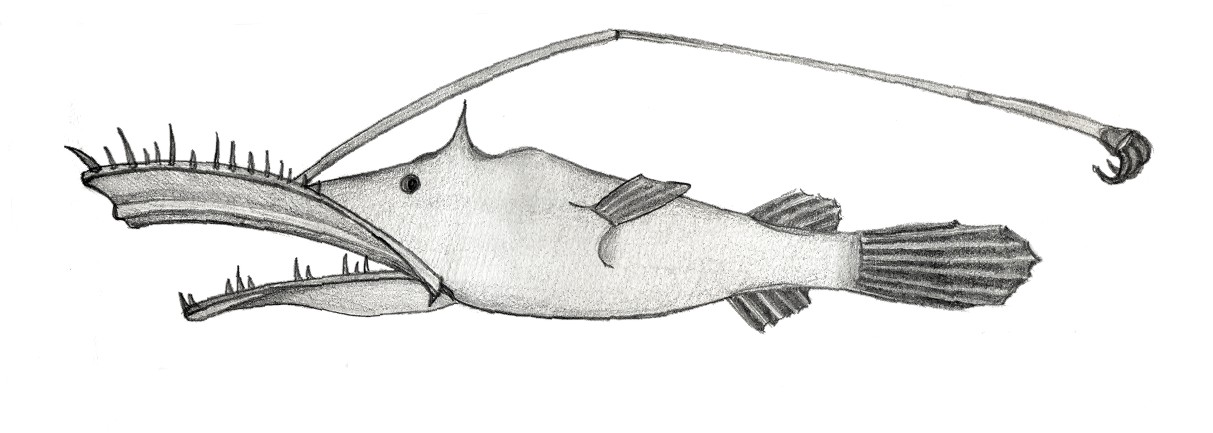

Conservation status
- Least Concern (IUCN 3.1)

Scientific classification
- Kingdom: Animalia
- Phylum: Chordata
- Class: Actinopterygii
- Order: Lophiiformes
- Family: Oneirodidae
- Genus: Lasiognathus
- Species: L. beebei

Binomial name
- Lasiognathus beebei Regan & Trewavas, 1932

= Lasiognathus beebei =

Species of fish

Lasiognathus beebei is a species of marine ray-finned fish belonging to the family Thaumatichthyidae, the wolftrap anglers. This species is known from around the Hawaiian Islands in the Pacific Ocean and from around Madeira and Bermuda in the Atlantic.

== Taxonomy ==
Lasioganthus beebei was first formally described in 1932 by the British ichthyologists Charles Tate Regan and Ethelwynn Trewavas with its type biology given as near Nonsuch Island, Bermuda from a depth between 0 and 1,100 m (0 and 3,609 ft). L. beebei is classified within the genus Lasiognathus which the 5th edition of Fishes of the World in classifies in the family Thaumatichthyidae within the suborder Ceratioidei of the anglerfish order Lophiiformes.

== Etymology ==
Lasiognathus beebei is a member of the genus Lasiognathus, this name is a combination of lasios, meaning "bearded", and gnathus, which means "jaw". This may be a reference to the many long teeth in the upper jaw, giving the appearance of a beard. The specific name honors the American naturalist William Beebe.

== Description ==
Lasiognathus beebei has 6 or 7 soft rays in its dorsal fin and 4 or 5 soft rays in its anal fin. It is distinguished from its congeners by the morphology of the esca which has a bulb without a membrane-like crest, a compressed fan-shaped appendage on its tip, three bony hooks along its rear margin which do not have long extensions emerging from their bases and a cylindrical rear appendage which tapers to a point. The illicium is just under half of the standard length, being longer in larger specimens. This species has a maximum published total length of 11.5 cm (4.5 in).

== Distribution and habitat ==
Lasiognathus beebei has been recorded from several widely scattered localities in the North Atlantic, as well as off Oahu in Hawaii. Its actual distribution is probably wider than this. It has been caught from depths between 0 and 1,100 m (0 and 3,609 ft).

== Biology ==
Lasiognathus beebei is piscivorous, although occasionally it preys on invertebrates.
