= Lasiognathus waltoni =

Conservation status
- Data Deficient (IUCN 3.1)

Scientific classification
- Kingdom: Animalia
- Phylum: Chordata
- Class: Actinopterygii
- Order: Lophiiformes
- Family: Oneirodidae
- Genus: Lasiognathus
- Species: L. waltoni

Binomial name
- Lasiognathus waltoni Nolan & Rosenblatt, 1975

Species of fish

Lasiognathus waltoni is a species of marine ray-finned fish belonging to the family Thaumatichthyidae, the wolftrap anglers. This species is known only from the eastern central Pacific Ocean.

== Taxonomy ==
Lasiognatus waltoni was first formally described in 1975 by the ichthyologists Ronald Scott Nolan and Richard Heinrich Rosenblatt with its type locality given as the Caribbean Sea, approximately 98 km (61 mi) the northern central Pacific, to the northeast of the Hawaiian Islands ], at 30°39.1'N, 155°23.4'W or 30°39.2'N, 155°18.1'W, from a depth of 0–1,350 m (0–4,429 ft) where the sea was 5,661 m (18,573 ft) deep. The genus Lasiognathus is classified by the 5th edition of Fishes of the World in the family Thaumatichthyidae within the suborder Ceratioidei of the anglerfish order Lophiiformes.

== Etymology ==
Lasiognathus waltoni is a member of the genus Lasiognathus, this name is a combination of lasios, meaning "bearded", and gnathus, which means "jaw". This may be a reference to the many long teeth in the upper jaw, giving the appearance of a beard. The specific name honours Sir Izaak Walton, the author of The Compleat Angler, so this is an anglerfish named in honour of a famous angler.

== Description ==
Lasiognathus waltoni has its dorsal fin supported by 7 or 7 soft rays while the anal fin contains 4 or 5 soft rays. The species in Lasiognathus are identified from one another by the morphology of their esca and in this species the bulb of the esca has a membrane-like crest on its front. The appendage on the tip has a cylindrical stalk with thin filaments along its edge but no filaments emerging from the bases of the escal hooks. The appendage on the rear of the esca is broad and laterally flattened. The illicium emerges from under the escal pore. The only kbown specimen, the holotype, of this species had a standard length of 9.4 cm (3.7 in).

== Distribution and habitat ==
Lasiognathus waltoniis known from a single specimen collected from near Oahu in 1972 from a depth of between 0 and 1,350 m (0 and 4,429 ft).
