= Thaumatichthys axeli =

Scientific classification
- Domain: Eukaryota
- Kingdom: Animalia
- Phylum: Chordata
- Class: Actinopterygii
- Order: Lophiiformes
- Family: Thaumatichthyidae
- Genus: Thaumatichthys
- Species: T. axeli

Binomial name
- Thaumatichthys axeli (Bruun, 1953)

Species of fish

Prince Axel's wonderfish (Thaumatichthys axeli) is a bottom-dwelling deep-sea anglerfish of the family Thaumatichthyidae. Thaumatichthys axeli lives at a depth of around 3,600 meters (in the abyssal zone), deeper than any other member of the genus Thaumatichthys. As with other members of the family, they possess a distinctive forked light organ inside their mouth, which they use to lure prey. Large, curved teeth "fringe the upper jaw like a comb". Specimens have been found measuring up to about 50 cm.

== History ==
Thaumatichthys axeli was discovered during the Galathea expedition of 1950–1952. Anton Bruun described it as "unquestionably the strangest catch of the Galathea Expedition, and altogether one of the oddest creatures in the teeming variety of the fish world."

On discovery, it was thought to represent a new genus, and was given the name Galatheathauma axeli (the genus being named after their ship, and the species name a tribute to Prince Axel of Denmark). The discoverers were aware of a previously discovered anglerfish with the esca (light organ) in its mouth, Thaumatichthys pagidostomus, but because the only specimen of T. pagidostomus had been measured at 8 cm, it was considered unlikely to be of the same genus. Later, it was realized that the size difference was attributable to age, and Galatheathauma was merged with Thaumatichthys.
