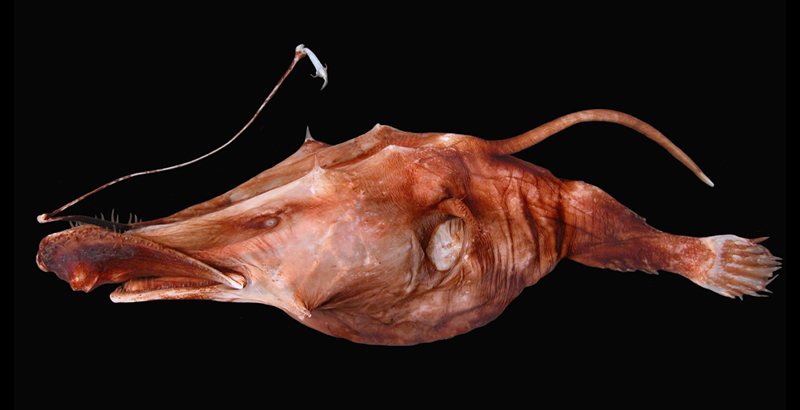
- Lasiognathus amphirhamphus

Scientific classification
- Kingdom: Animalia
- Phylum: Chordata
- Class: Actinopterygii
- Division: Teleostei
- Order: Lophiiformes
- Family: Oneirodidae
- Genus: Lasiognathus; Regan, 1925

Type species
- Lasiognathus saccostoma Regan, 1925
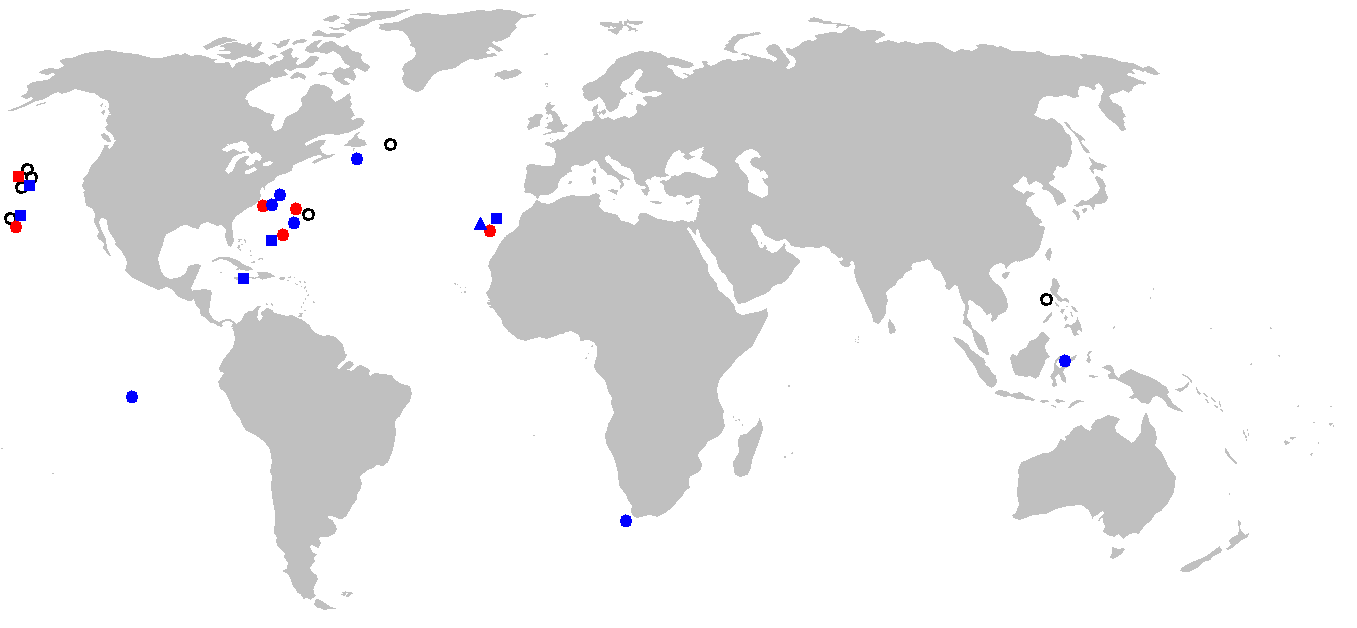
- Occurrences of Lasiognathus

= Lasiognathus =

Genus of fishes

Lasiognathus, the wolftrap anglerfish, is a genus of deep-sea anglerfish in the family Oneirodidae, with six species known from the Atlantic and Pacific Oceans.

It is distinct from other anglerfish for an enormous upper jaw with premaxillaries that can be folded down to enclose the much shorter lower jaw. Its lure apparatus appears to consist of a "complete" fishing rod; the projecting basal bone or pteropterygium being the rod itself; the illicium (a modified dorsal fin ray) being the fishing line; the bioluminescent esca as bait; and hook-like enlarged dermal denticles on the esca.

== Etymology ==
Lasiognathus comes from the Ancient Greek lasios, meaning "hairy", and gnathos, meaning "jaw". The common names seems to allude to jaw traps; the hinged premaxillae of Lasiognathus resemble the linked jaw-traps employed by trappers to capture large fur-bearing mammals, such as wolves. The genus may also be referred to as the wolftrap seadevils, trapjaw seadevils, or snaggletooth seadevils (with "sea devil" being a term used for deep sea anglerfish across families).

== Description ==
Only metamorphosed female Lasiognathus have been collected and described; there is presumably extreme sexual dimorphism in size and shape, as with other deep-sea anglerfishes. These fishes have a slender body with a large, slender head measuring over 60% of the standard length. The mouth is huge, with the premaxillaries of the upper jaw enlarged and extending well beyond the short lower jaw. The premaxillaries are separated anteriorly and connected by a broad elastic membrane, and are hinged with the upper jaw so that they are able to flip up and down. When in the latter position, the premaxillaries completely enclose the lower jaw. There are numerous long, hooked teeth placed in roughly oblique rows on the premaxillaries.

The pterygiophore (the basal bone supporting the illicium) of Lasiognathus is unusually long amongst anglerfish, measuring some 85% of the standard length. This bone inserts dorsally on the head and is capable of sliding forwards and backwards within a trough that extends the full length of the cranium and between the epaxial musculature on the front half of the body. The illicium is also long, with a terminal esca and 2-3 bony hook-shaped denticles mounted on an appendage at the tip. The escal bulb is equipped with a flap of skin that allows adjustment of the emitted light. The sphenotic spines (above the eyes) are well-developed, as are the two articular spines (at the rear end of the lower jaw). The operculum is divided into two parts, with the dorsal part split into two (rarely three) branches.

The pectoral fin lobe is small, short, and broad; the fin rays number 5 in the dorsal fin, 5 in the anal fin, 14–20 in the pectoral fins, and 9 in the caudal fin. The skin is entirely naked, without spines or denticles. The coloration is a deep chocolate brown. All Lasiognathus are small fishes; L. amphirhamphus is the largest known species at 15.7 cm standard length. L. beebei attains a maximum length of 11.5 cm, L. dinema 9.5 cm, L. intermedius 12.9 cm, L. saccostoma 7.7 cm, and L. waltoni 9.4 cm.

== Systematics ==
Lasiognathus was originally placed in the family Thaumatichthyidae due to morphological similarities with Thaumatichthys, such as enlarged hinged premaxillaries, escal denticles, and a branched operculum. However, differences between these genera, including features shared with oneirodids but absent in Thaumatichthys, suggested that Lasiognathus may belong elsewhere. Bertelsen and Struhsaker (1977) noted that family placement was somewhat subjective given the unclear cladistics of the Oneirodidae.

While the 5th edition of Fishes of the World still recognizes Thaumatichthyidae as a valid family within Ceratioidei, more recent phylogenetic work using morphological and molecular data (mitochondrial sequences and ultra-conserved elements) has recovered Lasiognathus nested within the Oneirodidae, as sister to Puck + (Chirophryne + Leptacanthichthys); Thaumatichthyidae is now monotypic, only encompassing Thaumatichthys.

== Species ==
There are currently 6 recognized species in this genus, which are only distinguishable by the morphology of the esca. This genus was previously considered part of the family Thaumatichthyidae, but is now placed in the Oneirodidae:

- Lasiognathus amphirhamphus Pietsch, 2005

This species is characterized by having only two (as opposed to three) bony hooks on its esca, which are lightly pigmented. The distal escal appendage is elongated and cylindrical with a long, compressed prolongation at the tip as in L. saccostoma. The prolongation has six tiny filaments at the tip and no lateral serrations. The posterior escal appendage is broad and laterally compressed.

- Lasiognathus beebei Regan & Trewavas, 1932

This species is distinguishable by its hooks being placed on a short, transverse, fan-shaped distal escal appendage as opposed to the elongated, cylindrical appendage of all other species.

- Lasiognathus dinema Pietsch & T. T. Sutton, 2015

This species is similar to any of the five previously described members of the genus, these species is unique in having a cylindrical, internally pigmented, anterior escal appendage and a pair of elongate distal escal appendages.

- Lasiognathus intermedius Bertelsen & Pietsch, 1996

This species has an elongated, cylindrical distal appendage with a short, cylindrical prolongation at the tip without any lateral serrations or filaments. The posterior escal appendage is cylindrical in shape. Its species name refers to its esca being intermediate in shape between those of L. beebei and those of L. saccostoma and L. waltoni.

- Lasiognathus saccostoma Regan, 1925

This species has a slender, compressed prolongation at the tip of its elongated, cylindrical distal escal appendage, with numerous lateral serrations and distal filaments. Unlike in L. amphirhamphus, there are three escal hooks and they are darkly pigmented. The posterior escal appendage is broad and laterally compressed, and relatively larger than in L. amphirhamphus.

- Lasiognathus waltoni Nolan & Rosenblatt, 1975

This species is characterized by a membranous anterior crest on its escal bulb, and an elongated, cylindrical distal escal appendage without a prolongation at the tip.

== Distribution and habitat ==
Lasiognathus species have been collected from widely scattered localities in the Atlantic and Pacific Oceans. L. beebei is known from the north Atlantic and off Oahu in Hawaiian Islands. L. waltoni is known from the central Pacific, just north of Oahu. L. dinema is known from the northern Gulf of Mexico. L. intermedius is known from the western north Atlantic, the eastern south Pacific, and from off Cape Town, South Africa. L. saccostoma is known from the north Atlantic and off the Hawaiian Islands. L. amphirhamphus is known from off the Madeira Islands in the eastern north Atlantic. Lasiognathus specimens of uncertain species are also known from the north Pacific and the South China Sea. They are pelagic in nature, occurring to a depth of 4,000 m.

== Biology and ecology ==
Little is known of the life habits of Lasiognathus. William Beebe speculated in 1930 that the fishing apparatus of Lasiognathus might "be cast swiftly ahead, when then the hooks and the lights would so frighten any pursued fish that they would hesitate long enough to be engulfed in the onrushing maw," though Richard Ellis considered this scenario unlikely. Nolan and Rosenblatt (1975) echoed Beebe's skepticism that the hooks were actually used to hook prey, though they proposed that "squid tentacles could conceivably be impaled on the hooks and the prey thus secured". It has also been proposed that Lasiognathus might form its mouth into a sort of sieve for filter feeding. More likely, prey is simply attracted by the glowing esca to within range of the jaws.

Stomach contents reveal that Lasiognathus feeds primarily on bony fishes, such as lanternfishes and bristlemouths, and occasionally takes invertebrates including copepods, amphipods, mysid shrimps, siphonophores, salps, pteropods, and chaetognaths. It is not known whether the males are parasitic; neither males nor larvae have yet been collected.
