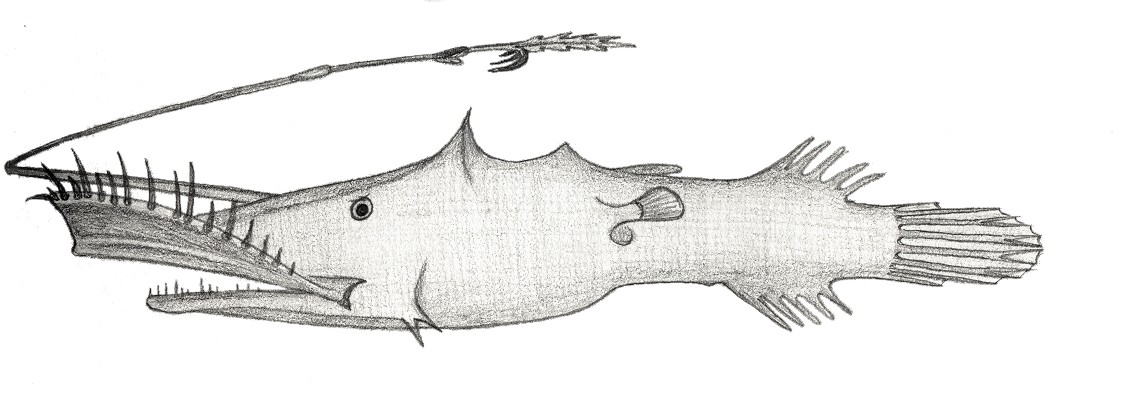

Conservation status
- Least Concern (IUCN 3.1)

Scientific classification
- Kingdom: Animalia
- Phylum: Chordata
- Class: Actinopterygii
- Order: Lophiiformes
- Family: Oneirodidae
- Genus: Lasiognathus
- Species: L. saccostoma

Binomial name
- Lasiognathus saccostoma Regan, 1925

Synonyms
- Lasiognathus ancistrophorus Maul, 1962

= Lasiognathus saccostoma =

Species of fish

Lasiognathus saccostoma, one of the wolftrap anglerfish or alternatively Regan's strainer mouth, is a species of marine ray-finned fish belonging to the family Thaumatichthyidae, the wolftrap anglers. This species is known from the eastern central Pacific Ocean and tropical waters of the Atlantic Ocean.

== Taxonomy ==
Lasiognathus saccostoma was first formally described in 1925 by the English ichthyologist Charles Tate Regan with its type locality given as the Caribbean Sea, approximately 98 km (61 mi) northwest of Negril, Jamaica at 18°50'N, 79°07'W, from a depth of around 2,000 m (6,600 ft). When Regan described this species he proposed the new monospecific genus Lasiognathus, making this species the type species of that genus. The genus Lasiognathus is classified by the 5th edition of Fishes of the World in the family Thaumatichthyidae within the suborder Ceratioidei of the anglerfish order Lophiiformes.

== Etymology ==
Lasiognathus saccostoma is a member of the genus Lasiognathus, this name is a combination of lasios, meaning "bearded", and gnathus, which means "jaw". This may be a reference to the many long teeth in the upper jaw, goving the appearance of a beard. The specific name saccostoma, combines sakkos, which means "bag", "pouch" or "pocket", with stoma, meaning "mouth", a reference to the premaxillaries having a wide membrane which connects them to the head, this makes a membranous pouch, the "trap" of wolftrap, in which the fish holds its prey before swallowing it.

== Description ==
Lasiognathus saccostoma has its dorsal fin supported by 7 or 7 soft rays while the anal fin contains 4 or 5 soft rays. The species in Lasiognathus are identified from one another by the morphology of their esca and in this species the bulb of the esca has no membrane-like crest on its front. The appendage on the tip has a cylindrical stalk with thin filaments emerging from the front base of the black hooks on the esca. The appendage on the rear of the esca is laterally flattened and rounded and has an irregularly rounded margin and wide base, emerging from under the escal pore. This species has a maximum published standard length of 7.7 cm (3.0 in).

== Distribution and habitat ==
Lasiognathus saccostoma has been recorded in warmer waters of the North Atlantic and northeast Pacific. Specimens have been collected in trawls from depths between 800 and 1,800 m (2,600 and 5,900 ft)>
