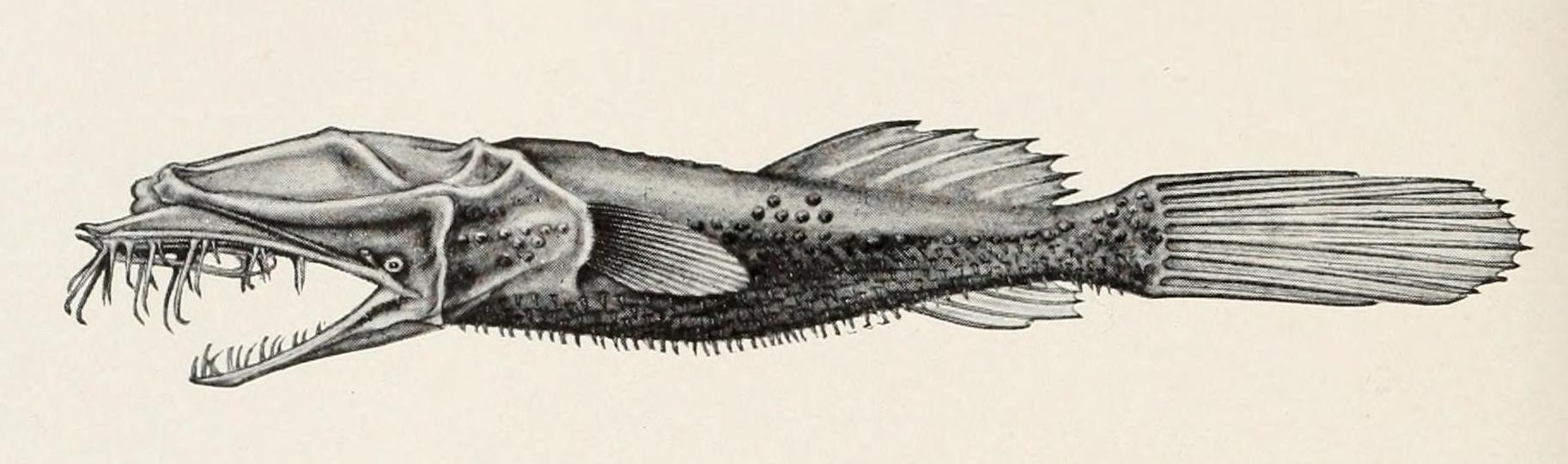

Scientific classification
- Kingdom: Animalia
- Phylum: Chordata
- Class: Actinopterygii
- Order: Lophiiformes
- Family: Thaumatichthyidae
- Genus: Thaumatichthys
- Species: T. pagidostomus

Binomial name
- Thaumatichthys pagidostomus H. M. Smith & Radcliffe, 1912

= Thaumatichthys pagidostomus =

Species of fish

Thaumatichthys pagidostomus is a species of wonderfish found in the Indian and Atlantic Oceans at a depth of around 1,392 metres (4,567 ft). This species grows to a length of 8.5 centimetres (3.3 in) TL. This species has relatively longer premaxillaries than the other species (measuring 33% of standard length), and the anterior premaxillary teeth are long.
