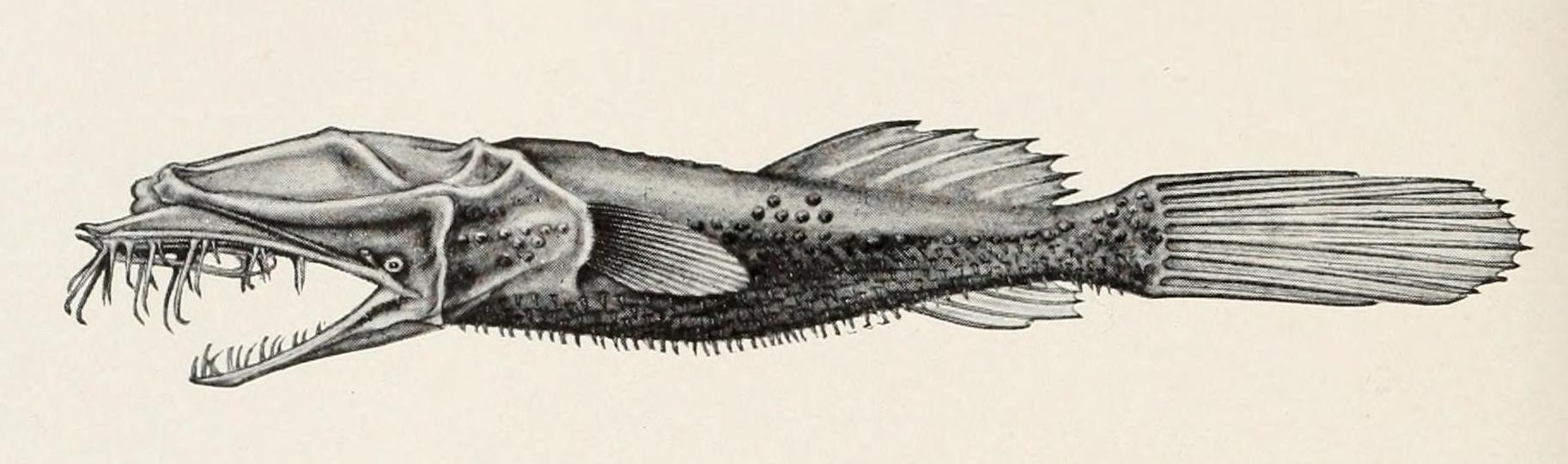
- Thaumatichthys pagidostomus

Scientific classification
- Kingdom: Animalia
- Phylum: Chordata
- Class: Actinopterygii
- Order: Lophiiformes
- Suborder: Ceratioidei
- Family: Thaumatichthyidae; Smith & Radcliffe, 1912
- Genus: Thaumatichthys; H. M. Smith & Radcliffe, 1912
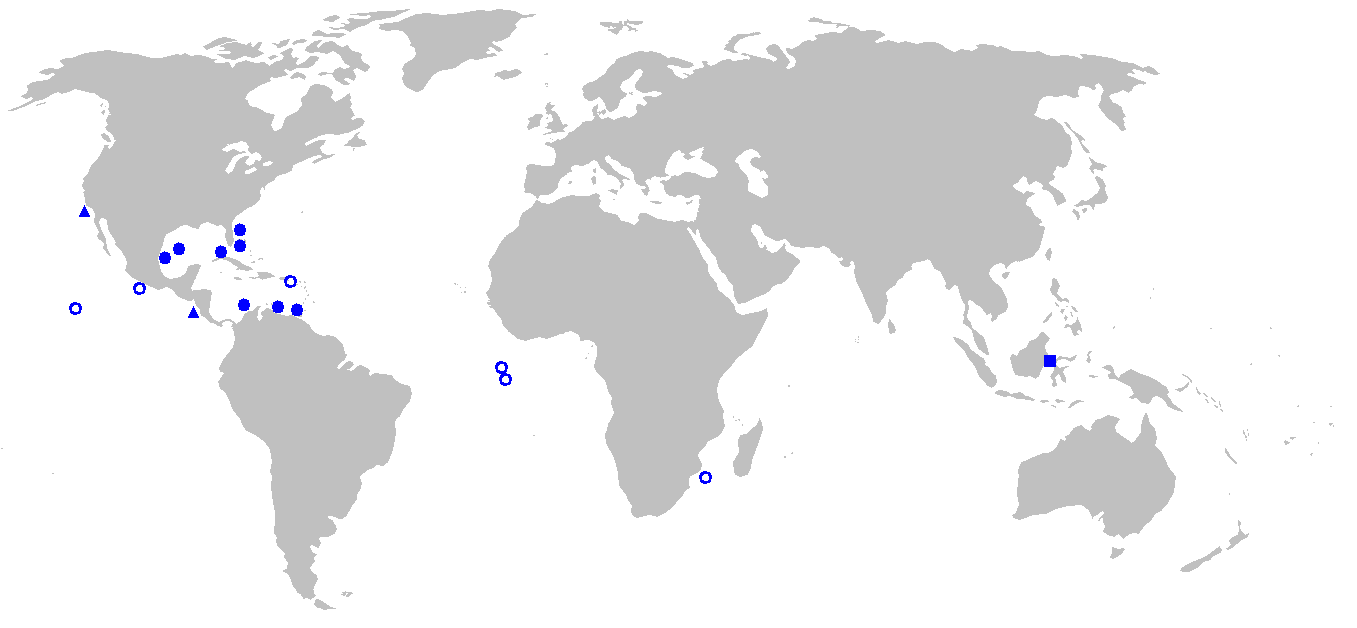
- Occurrences of Thaumatichthys

Synonyms
- Amacrodon Regan & Trewavas, 1932; Galatheathauma Bruun, 1953

= Thaumatichthys =

Genus of fishes

Thaumatichthys, the wonderfish or trapjaw anglerfish, is a genus of deep-sea anglerfish in the family Thaumatichthyidae, with three known species. Its scientific name means "wonder-fish" in Greek; oceanographer Anton Bruun described these fishes as "altogether one of the oddest creatures in the teeming variety of the fish world." In contrast to other anglerfishes, the bioluminescent lure (called the "esca") of Thaumatichthys is located inside its cavernous mouth. They are worldwide in distribution and are ambush predators living near the ocean floor.

== Nomenclature ==
=== Taxonomy ===
The first specimen of Thaumatichthys was collected by an American expedition in Indonesia in 1908 and given the species name pagidostomus ("trap-mouthed"). A subsequent specimen from the north Atlantic was placed by Regan and Trewavas (1932) into a new genus, Amacrodon, based on differences in dentition. Bruun assigned a specimen collected by the Galathea Expedition of 1950–52 to a third genus, Galatheathauma ("Galathea's wonder"), as it was much larger than the previous specimens. However, a later examination of the then-32 known specimens showed that these differences were attributable to age, and thus there was only one valid genus, Thaumatichthys, with three species; the two aforementioned genera were lumped and became its synonym.

Historically, the closest relative of Thaumatichthys was thought to be Lasiognathus, which also possesses enlarged, hinged premaxillaries, denticles on the esca, and a branched upper operculum. However, significant differences were noted between the two genera, and Lasiognathus shares many more traits with members of the family Oneirodidae than does Thaumatichthys. A study using total-evidence revised the classification of anglerfish, and this team confirmed that Lasiognathus was in fact an Oneirodid, leaving Thaumatichthyidae as a monotypic family.

=== Etymology ===
Thaumatichthys is a combination of "thauma", meaning "wonder" or "marvel", and ichthys, the Greek word for "fish". The name alludes to the strange shape of T. pagidostomus with its large head that is almost as long as the rest of the body, the esca and illicium being inside the mouth to lure the prey into the huge trap-like mouth.

=== Species ===
There are currently three recognized species in this genus:

- Thaumatichthys axeli Bruun, 1953 Both this species and T. binghami have relatively shorter premaxillaries, at 23.5–27% of standard length. The esca of this species has a single pair of lateral lobes that are enlarged into tapering filaments in the largest individuals, and the uppermost median appendage on its esca is wart-like and not tapering.
- Thaumatichthys binghami A. E. Parr, 1927 This species is similar to T. axeli, except that its esca bears 2–3 pairs of lateral lobes that are elongated into tapering filaments in the largest individuals, and the uppermost medial appendage on the esca is finger-like and tapering.
- Thaumatichthys pagidostomus H. M. Smith & Radcliffe, 1912 This species has relatively longer premaxillaries than the other species (measuring 33% of standard length), and the anterior premaxillary teeth are long.

== Description and characteristics ==
Thaumatichthys resemble members of the family Oneirodidae, though the lower jaw projects well beyond the upper jaw and the upper part of the operculum is bifurcated. In comparison to other Ceratioid anglerfishes the wolftrap anglerfishes do not have the front end of the jawbones join at the midline of the mouth, instead being connected by a wide elastic membrane. They have very long, inwardly hooked premaxillary teeth. The pectoral fin has between 14 and 20 soft rays while the caudal fin has 9 soft rays, the 3 middle rays being forked.

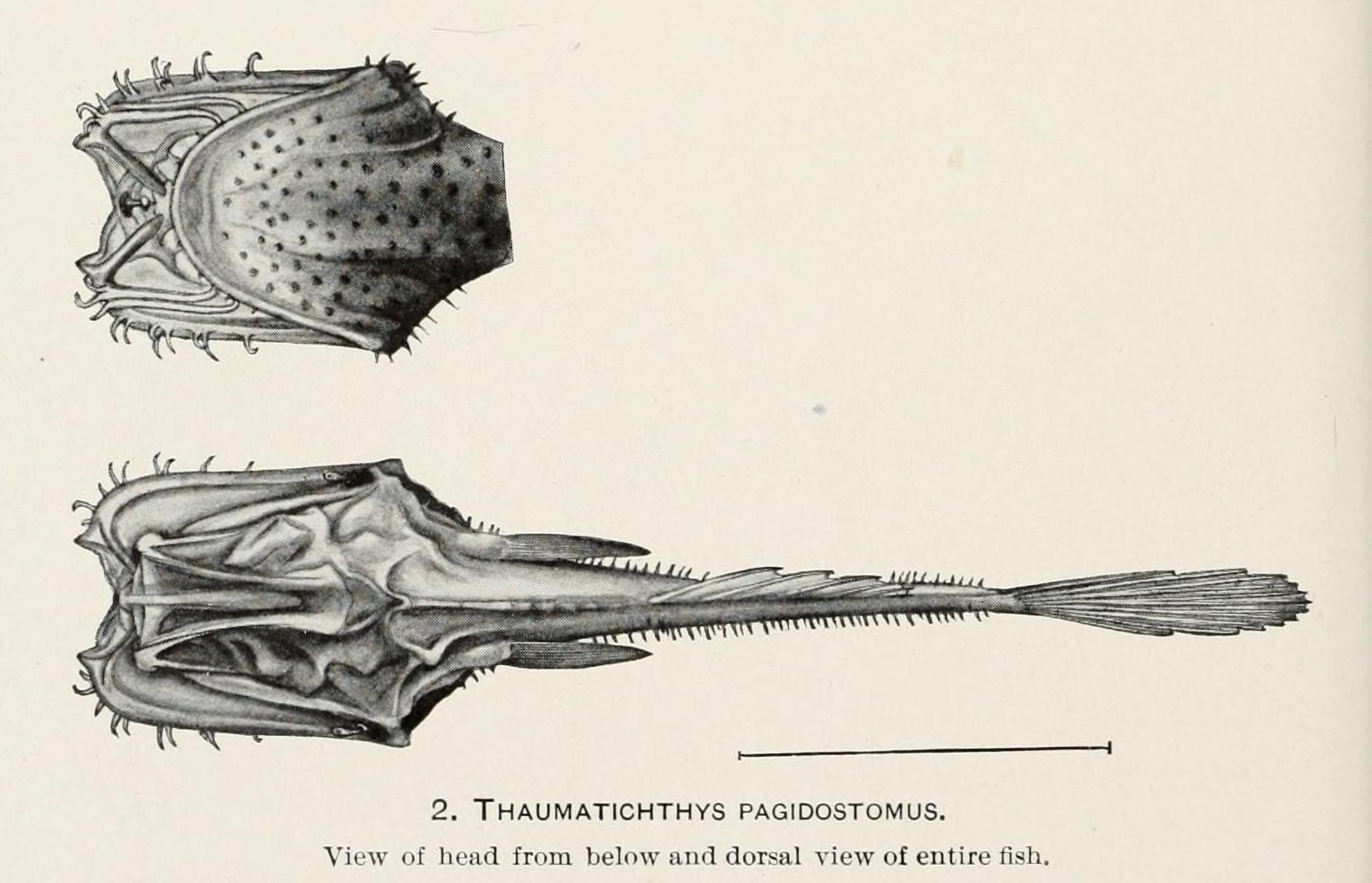
Dorsal and ventral view of T. pagidostomus.

As with most other deep-sea anglerfishes, Thaumatichthys shows extreme sexual dimorphism with the females much larger and different in morphology from the males. Female Thaumatichthys are characterized by a long, broad, flattened head with enlarged premaxillaries on the upper jaw that overhang the relatively short lower jaw. The premaxillaries are hinged with the skull in such a way that they can be moved down to enclose the lower jaw in a manner similar that of a Venus flytrap. The outer margin of the premaxillaries bear six rows of long, conical, recurved teeth; the teeth in the lower jaw are much shorter. The number and length of the teeth increases as the fish grows. In contrast, male Thaumatichthys are small and slender, with greatly enlarged olfactory organs, long hooked denticles at the tips of the jaws, and no esca. The skin is a uniform dark brown with small spines throughout. As the male matures, the body and head become less deep and the jaws become more prolongated. The largest known male specimen measured 45 mm (1.8 in) long.

The distinctive lure of Thaumatichthys is a result of the "upside-down" orientation of the illicium (the "fishing rod"): its base is embedded in the skin fold connecting the anterior ends of the premaxillaries, and the short illicium projects down and back so that the esca at the tip hangs down from the roof of the mouth. The escal bulb terminates in a pair of forked tendrils and bears varying numbers of lateral lobes and a single curved denticle. The size of the transparent window in the bulb can be adjusted to change the amount of light emanating from the lure.

The eyes are tiny and placed close to the corners of the mouth. There are numerous black papillae with white tips, resembling those of the lateral line (and likely belonging to the same sensory system), inside the mouth. The body is fairly slender and depressed for a deep-sea anglerfish, with a relatively well developed dorsal fin. The fin rays number 4 in the anal fin, 7 in the caudal fin, 6–7 in the dorsal fin, and 14–16 in the pectoral fins. The upper part of the operculum is divided into 5–13 radiating branches. The skin is velvet black or dark brown, with numerous small spines on the lower part of the head and body. The one specimen of T. pagidostomus measured 6cm long, the largest known specimen of T. binghami measured 29cm long, and the largest specimen of T. axeli measured 36.5cm long. Larvae have been recorded at 2.25 cm (0.89 in) while the largest free-living males are 3.6 cm (1.4 in).

== Distribution and habitat ==
Thaumatichthys is known from tropical oceanic waters worldwide. T. pagidostoma, the first species to be discovered, is only known from a single specimen caught at a depth of 1,440 m (4,720 ft) in the Gulf of Tomini off Sulawesi. T. axeli occurs in the eastern Pacific Ocean, while T. binghami is found in and around the Caribbean Sea. Larvae that could not be referred to species have also been found off the Gulf of Guinea in the southern Atlantic Ocean and in the southern Mozambique Channel in the eastern Indian Ocean.

Uniquely amongst deep-sea anglerfish, adult Thaumatichthys are benthic in nature; T. binghami and T. pagidostomus are found on the continental shelf between 1,000 to 2,000 m (3,300 to 6,600 ft), while T. axeli is found in the abyssal zone at about 3,600 m (11,800 ft); adult specimens are consistently absent from pelagic nets and are typically caught using bottom trawling. Additionally, benthic prey items were recovered from the stomach of a 294 mm (0.965 ft) T. binghami, the only specimen of this family with stomach contents, being three well preserved Benthodytes typica measuring 50–80 mm (2.0–3.1 in).

== Biology and ecology ==
The unusual jaw mechanism and esca of Thaumatichthys has been described as a "living mousetrap with bait"; the premaxillaries on either side of the upper jaw are able to rotate nearly 180° down to trap prey attracted by the luminescent lure; this closing action is effected by large, extremely well developed upper jaw muscles. Muscles in the illicium allow the esca to be swung forward and backward, so as to better entice prey inside the mouth. The upper jaw mechanism enables prey to be captured without the lower jaw, which can remain moving for the purposes of respiration. Despite this highly specialized predatory apparatus however, examination of the stomach contents of a 294 mm (0.965 ft) T. binghami, the only specimen with stomach contents, revealed sea cucumbers (being three well preserved Benthodytes typica measuring 50–80 mm (2.0–3.1 in)) as well as plant matter (being a piece of Sargassum and other indeterminate plant matter), suggesting that these fishes are omnivores, though these may have been incidentally swallowed along with the sea cucumbers, the fish swallowing anything edible.

It is unknown whether male Thaumatichthys are parasitic. The structure of the jaws in mature males suggests that feeding is impaired after metamorphosis. The larvae are epipelagic like those of other deep-sea anglerfishes, and are found at depths of no more than 100 m. As the larvae grow and approach metamorphosis, they descend deeper until they reach the bottom. The larvae can be identified by their divided operculum and a subdermal pigment layer that covers the entire head and body.
