= Loxocrepis =

Scientific classification
- Kingdom: Animalia
- Phylum: Arthropoda
- Class: Insecta
- Order: Coleoptera
- Suborder: Adephaga
- Family: Carabidae
- Subfamily: Platyninae
- Tribe: Platynini
- Subtribe: Platynina
- Genus: Loxocrepis; Eschscholtz, 1829

Synonyms
- Violagonum Darlington, 1956

Genus of beetles

Loxocrepis is a genus of ground beetles in the family Carabidae. There are about seven described species in Loxocrepis.

== Species ==
These seven species belong to the genus Loxocrepis:

- Loxocrepis cruralis (Chaudoir, 1879) (India, Myanmar, Taiwan, Vietnam, and temperate Asia)
- Loxocrepis dentifera (Darlington, 1970) (Indonesia)
- Loxocrepis obscuritarsis (Chaudoir, 1879) (worldwide)
- Loxocrepis picea (Andrewes, 1927) (Samoa and Vanuatu)
- Loxocrepis rubriola (Bates, 1883) (Japan and temperate Asia)
- Loxocrepis ruficeps (W.S.MacLeay, 1825) (India, Indonesia, Myanmar, Philippines, and Sri Lanka)
- Loxocrepis violacea (Chaudoir, 1859) (Australia, Indonesia, New Guinea, and the Solomon Islands)
