= Neodendragonum =

Scientific classification
- Domain: Eukaryota
- Kingdom: Animalia
- Phylum: Arthropoda
- Class: Insecta
- Order: Coleoptera
- Suborder: Adephaga
- Family: Carabidae
- Subfamily: Platyninae
- Tribe: Platynini
- Subtribe: Platynina
- Genus: Neodendragonum; Basilewsky, 1953

Genus of beetles

Neodendragonum is a genus of ground beetles in the family Carabidae. There are at least two described species in Neodendragonum.

== Species ==
These two species belong to the genus Neodendragonum:

- Neodendragonum laurenti (Basilewsky, 1950) (Democratic Republic of the Congo and Rwanda)
- Neodendragonum leleupi (Basilewsky, 1950) (Democratic Republic of the Congo)
