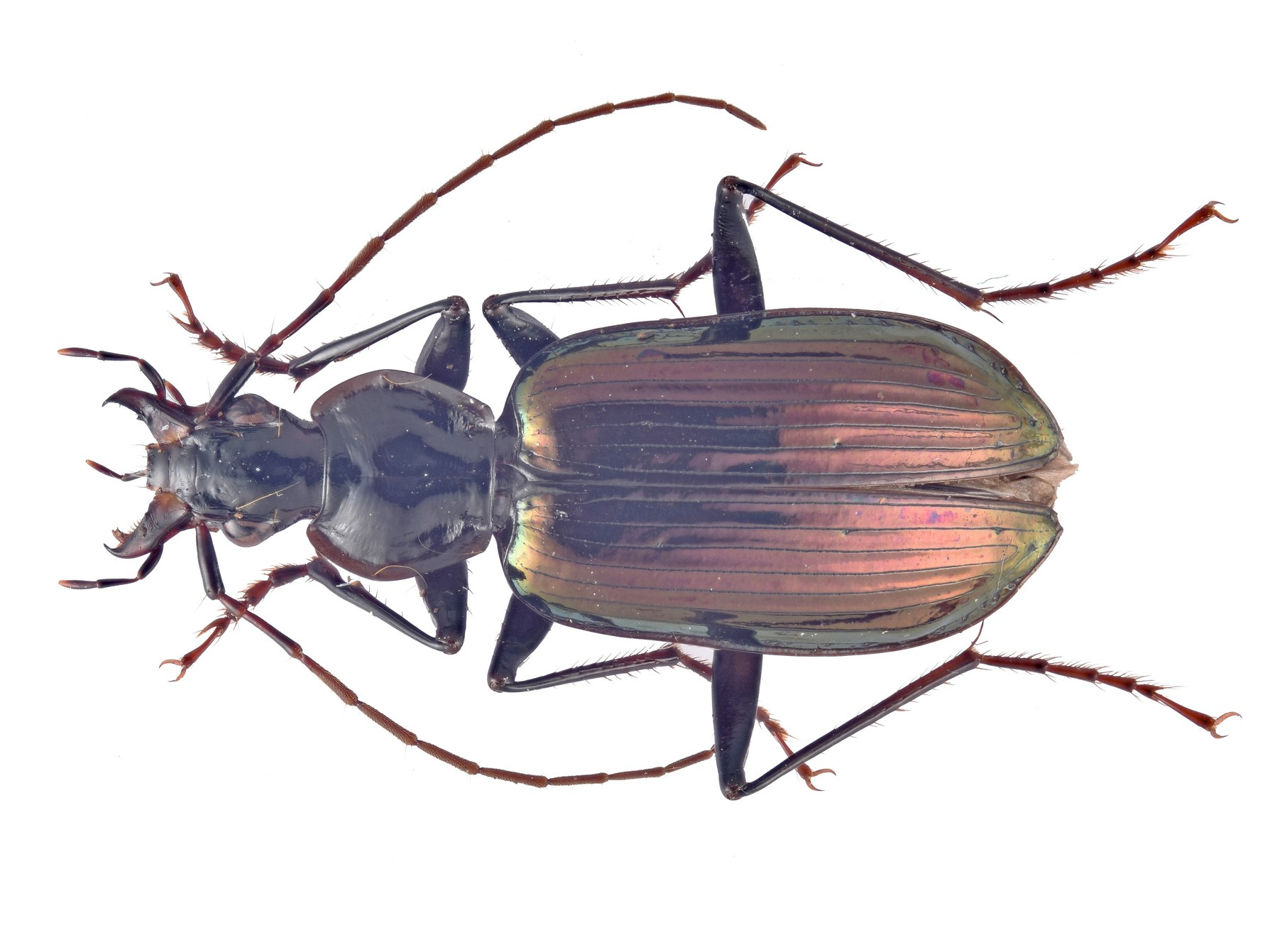

Scientific classification
- Kingdom: Animalia
- Phylum: Arthropoda
- Class: Insecta
- Order: Coleoptera
- Suborder: Adephaga
- Family: Carabidae
- Subfamily: Platyninae
- Tribe: Platynini
- Subtribe: Platynina
- Genus: Diacanthostylus; Habu, 1978

= Diacanthostylus =

Genus of beetles

Diacanthostylus is a genus of beetles in the family Carabidae, containing the following species:

- Diacanthostylus benesi Morvan, 1998
- Diacanthostylus boulbeni Morvan, 1998
- Diacanthostylus elainus Bates, 1883
- Diacanthostylus integratus Bates, 1883
- Diacanthostylus jeanneli Jedlicka, 1934
- Diacanthostylus morimotoi Habu, 1954
- Diacanthostylus parens Fairmaire, 1889
- Diacanthostylus remondi Morvan, 1998
- Diacanthostylus sichuanus Morvan & Tian, 2003
- Diacanthostylus zengae Morvan & Tian, 2003
