= Beckeria =

Scientific classification
- Kingdom: Animalia
- Phylum: Arthropoda
- Clade: Pancrustacea
- Class: Insecta
- Order: Coleoptera
- Suborder: Adephaga
- Family: Carabidae
- Subfamily: Platyninae
- Tribe: Platynini
- Subtribe: Platynina
- Genus: Beckeria; Jedlicka, 1931
- Species: B. horni

Binomial name
- Beckeria horni Jedlicka, 1931

Monospecific genus of beetles

Beckeria is a monospecific genus of beetles in the family Carabidae, containing a single species, Beckeria horni.
