= Dendragonum =

Scientific classification
- Domain: Eukaryota
- Kingdom: Animalia
- Phylum: Arthropoda
- Class: Insecta
- Order: Coleoptera
- Suborder: Adephaga
- Family: Carabidae
- Subfamily: Platyninae
- Tribe: Platynini
- Subtribe: Platynina
- Genus: Dendragonum; Jeannel, 1948

Subgenera
- Dendragonum Jeannel, 1948; Eudendragonum Basilewsky, 1975

Genus of beetles

Dendragonum is a genus of beetles in the family Carabidae, containing the following species:

- Dendragonum gerardi Burgeon, 1933 (Democratic Republic of the Congo)
- Dendragonum leroyi Basilewsky, 1949 (Democratic Republic of the Congo, Uganda, and Rwanda)
- Dendragonum nyakagerae (Basilewsky, 1975) (Democratic Republic of the Congo)
- Dendragonum paarmanni (Basilewsky, 1975) (Democratic Republic of the Congo)
- Dendragonum pallidum Burgeon, 1933 (Democratic Republic of the Congo, Uganda, Rwanda, and Burundi)
- Dendragonum schoutedeni Basilewsky, 1950 (Democratic Republic of the Congo, Uganda, Rwanda, and Burundi)
