= Neomegalonychus =

Scientific classification
- Domain: Eukaryota
- Kingdom: Animalia
- Phylum: Arthropoda
- Class: Insecta
- Order: Coleoptera
- Suborder: Adephaga
- Family: Carabidae
- Subfamily: Platyninae
- Tribe: Platynini
- Subtribe: Platynina
- Genus: Neomegalonychus; Jeannel, 1948
- Species: N. crassipes

Binomial name
- Neomegalonychus crassipes Jeannel, 1948

Genus of beetles

Neomegalonychus is a genus of ground beetles in the family Carabidae. This genus has a single species, Neomegalonychus crassipes. It is found in Madagascar.
