= Feroniascus =

Scientific classification
- Domain: Eukaryota
- Kingdom: Animalia
- Phylum: Arthropoda
- Class: Insecta
- Order: Coleoptera
- Suborder: Adephaga
- Family: Carabidae
- Subfamily: Platyninae
- Tribe: Platynini
- Subtribe: Platynina
- Genus: Feroniascus; Jeannel, 1951

Genus of beetles

Feroniascus is a genus of beetles in the family Carabidae, containing the following species:

- Feroniascus ambitiosus Basilewsky, 1985
- Feroniascus catalai (Jeannel, 1948)
- Feroniascus chlaenioides Jeannel, 1951
- Feroniascus vadoni Jeannel, 1951
