= Speocolpodes =

Scientific classification
- Domain: Eukaryota
- Kingdom: Animalia
- Phylum: Arthropoda
- Class: Insecta
- Order: Coleoptera
- Suborder: Adephaga
- Family: Carabidae
- Subfamily: Platyninae
- Tribe: Platynini
- Subtribe: Platynina
- Genus: Speocolpodes; Barr, 1974
- Species: S. franiai

Binomial name
- Speocolpodes franiai Barr, 1974

Genus of beetles

Speocolpodes is a genus of ground beetles in the family Carabidae. This genus has a single species, Speocolpodes franiai. It is found in Guatemala.
