= Skorlagad =

Scientific classification
- Domain: Eukaryota
- Kingdom: Animalia
- Phylum: Arthropoda
- Class: Insecta
- Order: Coleoptera
- Suborder: Adephaga
- Family: Carabidae
- Subfamily: Platyninae
- Tribe: Platynini
- Subtribe: Platynina
- Genus: Skorlagad; Morvan, 1999

Genus of beetles

Skorlagad is a genus of ground beetles in the family Carabidae. There are at least four described species in Skorlagad, found on the Indian subcontinent.

== Species ==
These four species belong to the genus Skorlagad:

- Skorlagad cameroni (Louwerens, 1953) (India and Nepal)
- Skorlagad kornbihanik Morvan, 2007 (India)
- Skorlagad kucerai Morvan, 2007 (India)
- Skorlagad nepalensis Morvan, 1999 (Nepal)
