= Paracolpodes =

Scientific classification
- Domain: Eukaryota
- Kingdom: Animalia
- Phylum: Arthropoda
- Class: Insecta
- Order: Coleoptera
- Suborder: Adephaga
- Family: Carabidae
- Subfamily: Platyninae
- Tribe: Platynini
- Subtribe: Platynina
- Genus: Paracolpodes; Basilewsky, 1985
- Species: P. mauritiensis

Binomial name
- Paracolpodes mauritiensis (Vinson, 1935)

Genus of beetles

Paracolpodes is a genus of ground beetles in the family Carabidae. This genus has a single species, Paracolpodes mauritiensis. It is found in Mauritius.
