= Dolichocolpodes =

Scientific classification
- Domain: Eukaryota
- Kingdom: Animalia
- Phylum: Arthropoda
- Class: Insecta
- Order: Coleoptera
- Suborder: Adephaga
- Family: Carabidae
- Subfamily: Platyninae
- Tribe: Platynini
- Subtribe: Platynina
- Genus: Dolichocolpodes; Basilewsky, 1985
- Species: D. mirabilis

Binomial name
- Dolichocolpodes mirabilis Basilewsky, 1985

Genus of beetles

Dolichocolpodes mirabilis is a species of beetle in the family Carabidae, the only species in the genus Dolichocolpodes.
