= Montagonum =

Scientific classification
- Domain: Eukaryota
- Kingdom: Animalia
- Phylum: Arthropoda
- Class: Insecta
- Order: Coleoptera
- Suborder: Adephaga
- Family: Carabidae
- Subfamily: Platyninae
- Tribe: Platynini
- Subtribe: Platynina
- Genus: Montagonum; Darlington, 1952

Genus of beetles

Montagonum is a genus of ground beetles in the family Carabidae. There are about nine described species in Montagonum, found in Indonesia and Papua New Guinea.

== Species ==
These nine species belong to the genus Montagonum:

- Montagonum filiola Darlington, 1971
- Montagonum fugitum Darlington, 1971
- Montagonum major Baehr, 2012
- Montagonum minor Baehr, 2012
- Montagonum nepos Darlington, 1971
- Montagonum pandum Darlington, 1971
- Montagonum riedeli Baehr, 2008
- Montagonum sororcula Darlington, 1971
- Montagonum toxopeanum Darlington, 1952
