= Archicolpodes =

Scientific classification
- Domain: Eukaryota
- Kingdom: Animalia
- Phylum: Arthropoda
- Class: Insecta
- Order: Coleoptera
- Suborder: Adephaga
- Family: Carabidae
- Subfamily: Platyninae
- Tribe: Platynini
- Subtribe: Platynina
- Genus: Archicolpodes; J.Schmidt, 2001
- Species: A. fukiensis

Binomial name
- Archicolpodes fukiensis (Jedlicka, 1956)

Genus of beetles

Archicolpodes fukiensis is a species of beetle in the family Carabidae, the only species in the genus Archicolpodes.
