= Sinocolpodes =

Scientific classification
- Domain: Eukaryota
- Kingdom: Animalia
- Phylum: Arthropoda
- Class: Insecta
- Order: Coleoptera
- Suborder: Adephaga
- Family: Carabidae
- Subfamily: Platyninae
- Tribe: Platynini
- Subtribe: Platynina
- Genus: Sinocolpodes; J.Schmidt, 2001

Genus of beetles

Sinocolpodes is a genus of ground beetles in the family Carabidae. There are at least three described species in Sinocolpodes, all of which are found in China.

== Species ==
These three species belong to the genus Sinocolpodes:

- Sinocolpodes krapog (Morvan, 1999)
- Sinocolpodes semiaeneus (Fairmaire, 1886)
- Sinocolpodes sycophanta (Fairmaire, 1886)
