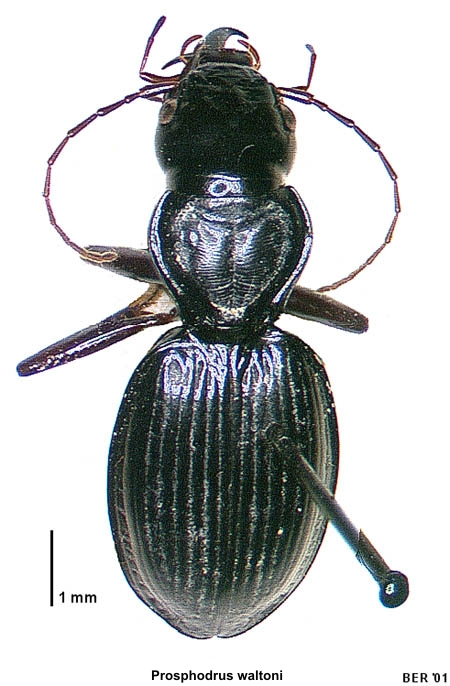
- Prosphodrus waltoni

Scientific classification
- Domain: Eukaryota
- Kingdom: Animalia
- Phylum: Arthropoda
- Class: Insecta
- Order: Coleoptera
- Suborder: Adephaga
- Family: Carabidae
- Subfamily: Platyninae
- Tribe: Platynini
- Subtribe: Platynina
- Genus: Prosphodrus; Britton, 1959

= Prosphodrus =

Genus of beetles

Prosphodrus is a genus of ground beetles in the family Carabidae. There are about five described species in Prosphodrus, found in New Zealand.

== Species ==
These five species belong to the genus Prosphodrus:

- Prosphodrus mangamuka Larochelle & Larivière, 2021
- Prosphodrus occultus Britton, 1960
- Prosphodrus sirvidi Larochelle & Larivière, 2021
- Prosphodrus waimana Larochelle & Larivière, 2021
- Prosphodrus waltoni Britton, 1959
