= Haplocolpodes =

Scientific classification
- Domain: Eukaryota
- Kingdom: Animalia
- Phylum: Arthropoda
- Class: Insecta
- Order: Coleoptera
- Suborder: Adephaga
- Family: Carabidae
- Subfamily: Platyninae
- Tribe: Platynini
- Subtribe: Platynina
- Genus: Haplocolpodes; Jeannel, 1951

Genus of beetles

Haplocolpodes is a genus of beetles in the family Carabidae, containing the following species:

- Haplocolpodes alluaudianus (Basilewsky, 1946)
- Haplocolpodes basilewskyanus (Jeannel, 1948)
- Haplocolpodes brachyderus (Jeannel, 1951)
- Haplocolpodes descarpentriesi (Alluaud, 1932)
- Haplocolpodes lithopius (Basilewsky, 1970)
- Haplocolpodes perrieri (Alluaud, 1899)
- Haplocolpodes renaudianus (Jeannel, 1951)
- Haplocolpodes vietteanus (Basilewsky, 1970)
- Haplocolpodes viridiaureus Basilewsky, 1985
