= Pseudobatenus =

Scientific classification
- Domain: Eukaryota
- Kingdom: Animalia
- Phylum: Arthropoda
- Class: Insecta
- Order: Coleoptera
- Suborder: Adephaga
- Family: Carabidae
- Subfamily: Platyninae
- Tribe: Platynini
- Subtribe: Platynina
- Genus: Pseudobatenus; Basilewsky, 1951

Genus of beetles

Pseudobatenus is a genus of ground beetles in the family Carabidae. There are at least three described species in Pseudobatenus.

== Species ==
These three species belong to the genus Pseudobatenus:

- Pseudobatenus camerunicus (Burgeon, 1942) (Cameroon)
- Pseudobatenus longicollis Basilewsky, 1951 (Cameroon)
- Pseudobatenus straneoi Basilewsky, 1957
