= Lobocolpodes =

Scientific classification
- Domain: Eukaryota
- Kingdom: Animalia
- Phylum: Arthropoda
- Class: Insecta
- Order: Coleoptera
- Suborder: Adephaga
- Family: Carabidae
- Subfamily: Platyninae
- Tribe: Platynini
- Subtribe: Platynina
- Genus: Lobocolpodes; Basilewsky, 1985

Genus of beetles

Lobocolpodes is a genus of ground beetles in the family Carabidae. There are about six described species in Lobocolpodes, found in Madagascar.

== Species ==
These six species belong to the genus Lobocolpodes:

- Lobocolpodes australis (Jeannel, 1955)
- Lobocolpodes cuprescens (Jeannel, 1949)
- Lobocolpodes murex (Alluaud, 1909)
- Lobocolpodes pachys (Jeannel, 1951)
- Lobocolpodes phenax (Alluaud, 1932)
- Lobocolpodes ranomandryae Basilewsky, 1985
