= Pseudomegalonychus =

Scientific classification
- Domain: Eukaryota
- Kingdom: Animalia
- Phylum: Arthropoda
- Class: Insecta
- Order: Coleoptera
- Suborder: Adephaga
- Family: Carabidae
- Subfamily: Platyninae
- Tribe: Platynini
- Subtribe: Platynina
- Genus: Pseudomegalonychus; Basilewsky, 1950

Genus of beetles

Pseudomegalonychus is a genus of ground beetles in the family Carabidae. There are at least three described species in Pseudomegalonychus, found in Africa.

== Species ==
These three species belong to the genus Pseudomegalonychus:

- Pseudomegalonychus debeckeri Basilewsky, 1976 (Tanzania)
- Pseudomegalonychus ferrugineus Basilewsky, 1956 (Burundi and Rwanda)
- Pseudomegalonychus uyttenboogaarti (Basilewsky, 1948) (South Africa)
