= Sophroferonia =

Scientific classification
- Domain: Eukaryota
- Kingdom: Animalia
- Phylum: Arthropoda
- Class: Insecta
- Order: Coleoptera
- Suborder: Adephaga
- Family: Carabidae
- Subfamily: Platyninae
- Tribe: Platynini
- Subtribe: Platynina
- Genus: Sophroferonia; Alluaud, 1933
- Species: S. parvitarsis

Binomial name
- Sophroferonia parvitarsis Alluaud, 1933

Genus of beetles

Sophroferonia is a genus of ground beetles in the family Carabidae. This genus has a single species, Sophroferonia parvitarsis. It is found in Mauritius.
