= Agonoriascus =

Scientific classification
- Domain: Eukaryota
- Kingdom: Animalia
- Phylum: Arthropoda
- Class: Insecta
- Order: Coleoptera
- Suborder: Adephaga
- Family: Carabidae
- Subfamily: Platyninae
- Tribe: Platynini
- Subtribe: Platynina
- Genus: Agonoriascus; Basilewsky, 1985
- Species: A. lapidicola

Binomial name
- Agonoriascus lapidicola Basilewsky, 1985

Genus of beetles

Agonoriascus lapidicola is a species of beetle in the family Carabidae, the only species in the genus Agonoriascus.
