= Dalatagonum =

Scientific classification
- Domain: Eukaryota
- Kingdom: Animalia
- Phylum: Arthropoda
- Class: Insecta
- Order: Coleoptera
- Suborder: Adephaga
- Family: Carabidae
- Subfamily: Platyninae
- Tribe: Platynini
- Subtribe: Platynina
- Genus: Dalatagonum; Fedorenko, 2011

Genus of beetles

Dalatagonum is a genus of beetles in the family Carabidae, found in Vietnam.

== Species ==
Dalatagonum contains the following fifteen species:

- Dalatagonum amariforme Fedorenko, 2018
- Dalatagonum anichkini Fedorenko, 2011
- Dalatagonum bidoupense Fedorenko, 2011
- Dalatagonum blattoides Fedorenko, 2011
- Dalatagonum broteroides Fedorenko, 2011
- Dalatagonum calathoides Fedorenko, 2011
- Dalatagonum convexicolle Fedorenko, 2018
- Dalatagonum ellipticum Fedorenko, 2011
- Dalatagonum elongatum Fedorenko, 2011
- Dalatagonum laticolle Fedorenko, 2018
- Dalatagonum quadrisetosum Fedorenko, 2018
- Dalatagonum rotundatum Fedorenko, 2018
- Dalatagonum rufipes Fedorenko, 2018
- Dalatagonum sericeum Fedorenko, 2011
- Dalatagonum simile Fedorenko, 2011
