= Paramegalonychus =

Scientific classification
- Domain: Eukaryota
- Kingdom: Animalia
- Phylum: Arthropoda
- Class: Insecta
- Order: Coleoptera
- Suborder: Adephaga
- Family: Carabidae
- Subfamily: Platyninae
- Tribe: Platynini
- Subtribe: Platynina
- Genus: Paramegalonychus; Basilewsky, 1953

Genus of beetles

Paramegalonychus is a genus of ground beetles in the family Carabidae. There are about 11 described species in Paramegalonychus, found in Africa.

== Species ==
These 11 species belong to the genus Paramegalonychus:

- Paramegalonychus bitalensis Basilewsky, 1975 (Democratic Republic of the Congo)
- Paramegalonychus brunneipennis (Burgeon, 1935) (Kenya and Uganda)
- Paramegalonychus brunneoniger (Kolbe, 1889) (Cameroon, Democratic Republic of the Congo, Guinea, Ivory Coast, and Sierra Leone)
- Paramegalonychus lamottei (Basilewsky, 1951) (Cameroon, Guinea, Ivory Coast, and Sierra Leone)
- Paramegalonychus mgetae Basilewsky, 1962 (Tanzania)
- Paramegalonychus montanus (Basilewsky, 1956) (Burundi and Rwanda)
- Paramegalonychus mulanjensis Basilewsky, 1988 (Malawi)
- Paramegalonychus nyakageranus Basilewsky, 1975 (Democratic Republic of the Congo)
- Paramegalonychus orophilus Basilewsky, 1962 (Tanzania)
- Paramegalonychus paludicola Basilewsky, 1975 (Democratic Republic of the Congo)
- Paramegalonychus tshibindensis (Burgeon, 1933) (Burundi, Democratic Republic of the Congo, and Rwanda)
