= Orthotrichus =

Scientific classification
- Domain: Eukaryota
- Kingdom: Animalia
- Phylum: Arthropoda
- Class: Insecta
- Order: Coleoptera
- Suborder: Adephaga
- Family: Carabidae
- Subfamily: Platyninae
- Tribe: Platynini
- Subtribe: Platynina
- Genus: Orthotrichus; Peyron, 1856

Diversity
- around 100 species

Genus of beetles

Orthotrichus is a genus of beetles in the family Carabidae, found mainly in Africa.

== Species ==
These species belong to the genus Orthotrichus:

- Orthotrichus acanthurus (Gestro, 1895)
- Orthotrichus adami (Basilewsky, 1953)
- Orthotrichus aequatorius (Chaudoir, 1854)
- Orthotrichus alternatus Bates, 1892
- Orthotrichus amauropterus (G.Muller, 1939)
- Orthotrichus amydrus (Basilewsky, 1948)
- Orthotrichus angolensis (Harold, 1879)
- Orthotrichus antrophilus (Alluaud, 1926)
- Orthotrichus ardens (Putzeys, 1880)
- Orthotrichus baehri (Morvan, 2002)
- Orthotrichus bequaerti (Burgeon, 1933)
- Orthotrichus bergeri (Basilewsky, 1976)
- Orthotrichus bwambanus (Basilewsky, 1949)
- Orthotrichus capicola (Peringuey, 1896)
- Orthotrichus carayoni (Basilewsky, 1949)
- Orthotrichus celsus (Basilewsky, 1988)
- Orthotrichus chagga (Alluaud, 1926)
- Orthotrichus chinensis Jedlicka, 1960b
- Orthotrichus chui (Basilewsky, 1962)
- Orthotrichus constricticollis (Burgeon, 1933)
- Orthotrichus corvulum (Basilewsky, 1963)
- Orthotrichus crenatostriatus (Peringuey, 1896)
- Orthotrichus cymindoides Dejean, 1831a
- Orthotrichus dacryodes (Basilewsky, 1953)
- Orthotrichus eberti Jedlicka, 1965f
- Orthotrichus elgeyoensis (Basilewsky, 1951)
- Orthotrichus elisabethanus (Basilewsky, 1954)
- Orthotrichus fizi (Basilewsky, 1962)
- Orthotrichus ghesquierei (Burgeon, 1933)
- Orthotrichus gilvipes (Boheman, 1848)
- Orthotrichus gracilis (Boheman, 1848)
- Orthotrichus harrarensis (Alluaud, 1918)
- Orthotrichus hessei (Basilewsky, 1950)
- Orthotrichus holomelas (Alluaud, 1932)
- Orthotrichus humicola (Basilewsky, 1956)
- Orthotrichus hutereauae (Burgeon, 1933)
- Orthotrichus idjwiensis (Burgeon, 1935)
- Orthotrichus indicus Bates, 1891cE
- Orthotrichus insolitus (Peringuey, 1904)
- Orthotrichus insuetus (Peringuey, 1904)
- Orthotrichus insulanus (Basilewsky, 1948)
- Orthotrichus irakensis Ali, 1967
- Orthotrichus ivorensis (Basilewsky, 1968)
- Orthotrichus janssensi (Basilewsky, 1953)
- Orthotrichus jocquei (Basilewsky, 1988)
- Orthotrichus kaboboanus (Basilewsky, 1960)
- Orthotrichus katanganus (Burgeon, 1933)
- Orthotrichus kirokae (Basilewsky, 1976)
- Orthotrichus kitaleanus (Burgeon, 1935)
- Orthotrichus lamottei (Basilewsky, 1972)
- Orthotrichus latipennis (Boheman, 1848)
- Orthotrichus latiusculus (Peringuey, 1904)
- Orthotrichus laurenti (Basilewsky, 1956)
- Orthotrichus lomaensis (Basilewsky, 1972)
- Orthotrichus luberoensis (Burgeon, 1933)
- Orthotrichus luctuosus (Reiche, 1850)
- Orthotrichus lujai (Burgeon, 1933)
- Orthotrichus luluensis (Burgeon, 1933)
- Orthotrichus madecassus (Jeannel, 1948)
- Orthotrichus mboko (Basilewsky, 1962)
- Orthotrichus meeli (Basilewsky, 1953)
- Orthotrichus megalocrates (Alluaud, 1926)
- Orthotrichus meruensis (Basilewsky, 1947)
- Orthotrichus motoensis (Burgeon, 1933)
- Orthotrichus ngiri (Basilewsky, 1962)
- Orthotrichus nimbanus (Basilewsky, 1951)
- Orthotrichus nindae (Burgeon, 1937)
- Orthotrichus nindanus (Burgeon, 1937)
- Orthotrichus niokolokobanus (Basilewsky, 1969)
- Orthotrichus nyikanus (Basilewsky, 1988)
- Orthotrichus obsequiosus (Peringuey, 1904)
- Orthotrichus patroboides (Murray, 1859)
- Orthotrichus planaticollis (Murray, 1859)
- Orthotrichus punda (Basilewsky, 1962)
- Orthotrichus quadridens (Chaudoir, 1878)
- Orthotrichus regularis (Putzeys, 1880)
- Orthotrichus robustus (Quedenfeldt, 1883)
- Orthotrichus royi (Basilewsky, 1972)
- Orthotrichus rufocinctus (Laferte-Senectere, 1853)
- Orthotrichus rugegeensis (Basilewsky, 1956)
- Orthotrichus sculptilis (Bates, 1886)
- Orthotrichus sculptipennis (Burgeon, 1935)
- Orthotrichus seynaevei (Basilewsky, 1956)
- Orthotrichus shimbanus (Basilewsky, 1948)
- Orthotrichus sira (Alluaud, 1926)
- Orthotrichus sjostedti (Alluaud, 1926)
- Orthotrichus spinicauda (G.Muller, 1944)
- Orthotrichus spinosulus (Basilewsky, 1955)
- Orthotrichus suborbicularis (Basilewsky, 1956)
- Orthotrichus subvirescens (Laferte-Senectere, 1853)
- Orthotrichus sudanicus (Basilewsky, 1954)
- Orthotrichus tabalpuri Jedlicka, 1965
- Orthotrichus thoracicus (Roth, 1851)
- Orthotrichus tropicalis (Putzeys, 1880)
- Orthotrichus twiga (Basilewsky, 1962)
- Orthotrichus uelensis (Burgeon, 1933)
- Orthotrichus umtalianus (Peringuey, 1904)
- Orthotrichus usambaranus (Basilewsky, 1948)
- Orthotrichus verheyeni (Basilewsky, 1953)
