= Jocqueius =

Scientific classification
- Domain: Eukaryota
- Kingdom: Animalia
- Phylum: Arthropoda
- Class: Insecta
- Order: Coleoptera
- Suborder: Adephaga
- Family: Carabidae
- Subfamily: Platyninae
- Tribe: Platynini
- Subtribe: Platynina
- Genus: Jocqueius; Basilewsky, 1988
- Species: J. malawicus

Binomial name
- Jocqueius malawicus Basilewsky, 1988

Genus of beetles

Jocqueius is a genus of ground beetles in the family Carabidae. This genus has a single species, Jocqueius malawicus. It is found in Malawi.
