= Mexisphodrus =

Scientific classification
- Domain: Eukaryota
- Kingdom: Animalia
- Phylum: Arthropoda
- Class: Insecta
- Order: Coleoptera
- Suborder: Adephaga
- Family: Carabidae
- Subfamily: Platyninae
- Tribe: Platynini
- Subtribe: Platynina
- Genus: Mexisphodrus; Barr, 1965

Genus of beetles

Mexisphodrus is a genus of ground beetles in the family Carabidae. There are about 12 described species in Mexisphodrus, found in North America.

== Species ==
These 12 species belong to the genus Mexisphodrus:

- Mexisphodrus boneti (Bolivar y Pieltain & Hendrichs, 1964) (Mexico)
- Mexisphodrus cancuc Barr, 1982 (Mexico)
- Mexisphodrus cuetzalan Barr, 1982 (Mexico)
- Mexisphodrus gertschi Hendrichs & Bolivar y Pieltain, 1966 (Mexico)
- Mexisphodrus profundus Barr, 1966 (Mexico)
- Mexisphodrus purgatus Barr, 1982 (Mexico)
- Mexisphodrus spiritus Barr, 1982 (Mexico)
- Mexisphodrus tlamayaensis Barr, 1966 (Mexico)
- Mexisphodrus urquijoi Hendrichs & Bolivar y Pieltain, 1978 (Mexico)
- Mexisphodrus valverdensis Barr, 1982 (North America)
- Mexisphodrus veraecrucis Barr, 1965 (Mexico)
- Mexisphodrus zoquitlan Barr, 1982 (Mexico)
