= Gastragonum =

Scientific classification
- Domain: Eukaryota
- Kingdom: Animalia
- Phylum: Arthropoda
- Class: Insecta
- Order: Coleoptera
- Suborder: Adephaga
- Family: Carabidae
- Subfamily: Platyninae
- Tribe: Platynini
- Subtribe: Platynina
- Genus: Gastragonum; Darlington, 1952

Genus of beetles

Gastragonum is a genus in the beetle family Carabidae. There are about 10 described species in Gastragonum.

== Species ==
These 10 species belong to the genus Gastragonum:

- Gastragonum caecum B.Moore, 1977 (New Guinea)
- Gastragonum esulcatum Baehr, 2012 (Indonesia and New Guinea)
- Gastragonum frontepunctum Darlington, 1952 (New Guinea)
- Gastragonum giluwe Baehr, 2012 (New Guinea and Papua)
- Gastragonum laevisculptum Darlington, 1952 (Indonesia and New Guinea)
- Gastragonum subrotundum Darlington, 1952 (Indonesia and New Guinea)
- Gastragonum terrestre Darlington, 1952 (New Guinea)
- Gastragonum terrestroides Darlington, 1952 (Indonesia and New Guinea)
- Gastragonum trechoides Darlington, 1952 (Indonesia and New Guinea)
- Gastragonum wau Baehr, 2012 (New Guinea and Papua)
