= Skoeda =

Scientific classification
- Domain: Eukaryota
- Kingdom: Animalia
- Phylum: Arthropoda
- Class: Insecta
- Order: Coleoptera
- Suborder: Adephaga
- Family: Carabidae
- Subfamily: Platyninae
- Tribe: Platynini
- Subtribe: Platynina
- Genus: Skoeda; Morvan, 1995

Genus of beetles

Skoeda is a genus of ground beetles in the family Carabidae. There are about 11 described species in Skoeda, all found in Nepal.

== Species ==
These 11 species belong to the genus Skoeda:

- Skoeda deliae Morvan, 1995
- Skoeda digammus Morvan, 1995
- Skoeda divleo Morvan, 1995
- Skoeda heinigeri Morvan, 1995
- Skoeda holzschuhi Morvan, 1995
- Skoeda kornreizus Morvan, 1995
- Skoeda moanus Morvan, 1995
- Skoeda montis (Jedlicka, 1965)
- Skoeda mus (Jedlicka, 1965)
- Skoeda naviauxi Morvan, 1995
- Skoeda shimomurai Morvan, 1995
