= Helluocolpodes =

Scientific classification
- Kingdom: Animalia
- Phylum: Arthropoda
- Class: Insecta
- Order: Coleoptera
- Suborder: Adephaga
- Family: Carabidae
- Subfamily: Platyninae
- Tribe: Platynini
- Subtribe: Platynina
- Genus: Helluocolpodes; Liebherr, 2005

Genus of beetles

Helluocolpodes is a genus in the beetle family Carabidae. There are at least four described species in Helluocolpodes.

== Species ==
These four species belong to the genus Helluocolpodes:

- Helluocolpodes discicollis Liebherr, 2005 (Vanuatu)
- Helluocolpodes helluo (Darlington, 1952) (Indonesia and New Guinea)
- Helluocolpodes mucronis Liebherr, 2005 (Vanuatu)
- Helluocolpodes multipunctatus Liebherr, 2005 (Vanuatu)
