= Pachybatenus =

Scientific classification
- Domain: Eukaryota
- Kingdom: Animalia
- Phylum: Arthropoda
- Class: Insecta
- Order: Coleoptera
- Suborder: Adephaga
- Family: Carabidae
- Subfamily: Platyninae
- Tribe: Platynini
- Subtribe: Platynina
- Genus: Pachybatenus; Basilewsky, 1973
- Species: P. obscurus

Binomial name
- Pachybatenus obscurus Basilewsky, 1973

Genus of beetles

Pachybatenus is a genus of ground beetles in the family Carabidae. This genus has a single species, Pachybatenus obscurus. It is found in Mozambique.
