= Paranchodemus =

Scientific classification
- Kingdom: Animalia
- Phylum: Arthropoda
- Class: Insecta
- Order: Coleoptera
- Suborder: Adephaga
- Family: Carabidae
- Subfamily: Platyninae
- Tribe: Platynini
- Subtribe: Platynina
- Genus: Paranchodemus; Habu, 1978

Genus of beetles

Paranchodemus is a genus of ground beetles in the family Carabidae. There are at least four described species in Paranchodemus, found in eastern Asia.

== Species ==
These four species belong to the genus Paranchodemus:

- Paranchodemus calleides (Bates, 1883) (Japan)
- Paranchodemus davidis Liebherr, 1989 (China)
- Paranchodemus ishiguroi Morita; Toda & Kanie, 2008 (Japan)
- Paranchodemus thibetanus (Morvan, 1998) (China)
