= Straneoa =

Scientific classification
- Domain: Eukaryota
- Kingdom: Animalia
- Phylum: Arthropoda
- Class: Insecta
- Order: Coleoptera
- Suborder: Adephaga
- Family: Carabidae
- Subfamily: Platyninae
- Tribe: Platynini
- Subtribe: Platynina
- Genus: Straneoa; Basilewsky, 1953

Genus of beetles

Straneoa is a genus of ground beetles in the family Carabidae. There are at least two described species in Straneoa, found in islands off the west coast of Africa.

== Species ==
These two species belong to the genus Straneoa:

- Straneoa collatata (Karsch, 1881) (Fernando Poo)
- Straneoa seligmani Kavanaugh, 2005 (Sao Tome)
