= Kuceraianum =

Scientific classification
- Domain: Eukaryota
- Kingdom: Animalia
- Phylum: Arthropoda
- Class: Insecta
- Order: Coleoptera
- Suborder: Adephaga
- Family: Carabidae
- Subfamily: Platyninae
- Tribe: Platynini
- Subtribe: Platynina
- Genus: Kuceraianum; Morvan, 2002

Genus of beetles

Kuceraianum is a genus of ground beetles in the family Carabidae. There are at least two described species in Kuceraianum, found in India.

== Species ==
These two species belong to the genus Kuceraianum:

- Kuceraianum azureum Morvan, 2002
- Kuceraianum kucerai Morvan, 2002
