= Iridagonum =

Scientific classification
- Domain: Eukaryota
- Kingdom: Animalia
- Phylum: Arthropoda
- Class: Insecta
- Order: Coleoptera
- Suborder: Adephaga
- Family: Carabidae
- Subfamily: Platyninae
- Tribe: Platynini
- Subtribe: Platynina
- Genus: Iridagonum; Darlington, 1952

Genus of beetles

Iridagonum is a genus of ground beetles in the family Carabidae. There are about nine described species in Iridagonum, found in Indonesia and New Guinea.

== Species ==
These nine species belong to the genus Iridagonum:

- Iridagonum caudostriatum Louwerens, 1969
- Iridagonum fessum Darlington, 1971
- Iridagonum laeve Louwerens, 1969
- Iridagonum quadripunctellum Darlington, 1952
- Iridagonum quadripunctum Darlington, 1952
- Iridagonum septimum Darlington, 1971
- Iridagonum sexpunctum Darlington, 1952
- Iridagonum subfusum Darlington, 1952
- Iridagonum vigil Darlington, 1971
