= Hikosanoagonum =

Scientific classification
- Kingdom: Animalia
- Phylum: Arthropoda
- Class: Insecta
- Order: Coleoptera
- Suborder: Adephaga
- Family: Carabidae
- Subfamily: Platyninae
- Tribe: Platynini
- Subtribe: Platynina
- Genus: Hikosanoagonum; Habu, 1954

Genus of beetles

Hikosanoagonum is a genus of ground beetles in the family Carabidae. There are about five described species in Hikosanoagonum, found in Japan.

== Species ==
These five species belong to the genus Hikosanoagonum:

- Hikosanoagonum bungo Morita & Y.Ito, 2015
- Hikosanoagonum latius Ueno, 1964
- Hikosanoagonum mutsuomiyatakei (Habu, 1974)
- Hikosanoagonum shirozui (Habu, 1954)
- Hikosanoagonum yakuense (Habu, 1974)
