= Catacolpodes =

Scientific classification
- Domain: Eukaryota
- Kingdom: Animalia
- Phylum: Arthropoda
- Class: Insecta
- Order: Coleoptera
- Suborder: Adephaga
- Family: Carabidae
- Subfamily: Platyninae
- Tribe: Platynini
- Subtribe: Platynina
- Genus: Catacolpodes; Basilewsky, 1985

Genus of beetles

Catacolpodes is a genus of beetles in the family Carabidae, containing the following species:

- Catacolpodes aeneicollis (Jeannel, 1948)
- Catacolpodes arcticollis (Jeannel, 1951)
- Catacolpodes brachypterus Basilewsky, 1985
- Catacolpodes brevicornis (Jeannel, 1948)
- Catacolpodes carayoni Basilewsky, 1985
- Catacolpodes chalcotinctus Basilewsky, 1985
- Catacolpodes cordicollis Basilewsky, 1985
- Catacolpodes depressus (Jeannel, 1951)
- Catacolpodes divaricatus (Jeannel, 1948)
- Catacolpodes dolius (Alluaud, 1909)
- Catacolpodes eugrammus (Alluaud, 1932)
- Catacolpodes eutinctus Basilewsky, 1985
- Catacolpodes gitonius (Alluaud, 1935)
- Catacolpodes labathiei (Jeannel, 1948)
- Catacolpodes languidus Basilewsky, 1985
- Catacolpodes longespinosus (Basilewsky, 1970)
- Catacolpodes micheli (Jeannel, 1951)
- Catacolpodes mocquerysi (Jeannel, 1948)
- Catacolpodes nanus Basilewsky, 1985
- Catacolpodes petrorum Basilewsky, 1985
- Catacolpodes renaudi Basilewsky, 1985
- Catacolpodes rhagodus (Basilewsky, 1970)
- Catacolpodes scitoides Basilewsky, 1985
- Catacolpodes scitus (Jeannel, 1948)
- Catacolpodes scrobiculatus Basilewsky, 1985
- Catacolpodes sicardi (Alluaud, 1909)
- Catacolpodes silvicola (Jeannel, 1951)
- Catacolpodes sinopis (Alluaud, 1935)
- Catacolpodes solitarius Basilewsky, 1985
- Catacolpodes variolosus (Alluaud, 1897)
