= Lithagonum =

Scientific classification
- Domain: Eukaryota
- Kingdom: Animalia
- Phylum: Arthropoda
- Class: Insecta
- Order: Coleoptera
- Suborder: Adephaga
- Family: Carabidae
- Subfamily: Platyninae
- Tribe: Platynini
- Subtribe: Platynina
- Genus: Lithagonum; Darlington, 1952
- Species: L. annulicorne

Binomial name
- Lithagonum annulicorne (Maindron, 1908)

Genus of beetles

Lithagonum is a genus of ground beetles in the family Carabidae. This genus has a single species, Lithagonum annulicorne. It is found in Indonesia and Papua New Guinea.
