= Galiciotyphlotes =

Scientific classification
- Domain: Eukaryota
- Kingdom: Animalia
- Phylum: Arthropoda
- Class: Insecta
- Order: Coleoptera
- Suborder: Adephaga
- Family: Carabidae
- Subfamily: Platyninae
- Tribe: Platynini
- Subtribe: Platynina
- Genus: Galiciotyphlotes; Assmann, 1999
- Species: G. weberi

Binomial name
- Galiciotyphlotes weberi Assmann, 1999

Genus of beetles

Galiciotyphlotes weberi is a species of beetle in the family Carabidae, the only species in the genus Galiciotyphlotes.
