= Potamagonum =

Scientific classification
- Domain: Eukaryota
- Kingdom: Animalia
- Phylum: Arthropoda
- Class: Insecta
- Order: Coleoptera
- Suborder: Adephaga
- Family: Carabidae
- Subfamily: Platyninae
- Tribe: Platynini
- Subtribe: Platynina
- Genus: Potamagonum; Darlington, 1952

Genus of beetles

Potamagonum is a genus of ground beetles in the family Carabidae. There are at least four described species in Potamagonum, found in Indonesia and Papua New Guinea.

== Species ==
These four species belong to the genus Potamagonum:

- Potamagonum brandti Darlington, 1971
- Potamagonum diaphanum Darlington, 1952
- Potamagonum julianae Darlington, 1971
- Potamagonum postsetosum Darlington, 1971
