= Nesiocolpodes =

Scientific classification
- Domain: Eukaryota
- Kingdom: Animalia
- Phylum: Arthropoda
- Class: Insecta
- Order: Coleoptera
- Suborder: Adephaga
- Family: Carabidae
- Subfamily: Platyninae
- Tribe: Platynini
- Subtribe: Platynina
- Genus: Nesiocolpodes; Jeannel, 1948

Genus of beetles

Nesiocolpodes is a genus of ground beetles in the family Carabidae. There are at least two described species in Nesiocolpodes.

== Species ==
These two species belong to the genus Nesiocolpodes:

- Nesiocolpodes saphyrinus (Chaudoir, 1879) (worldwide)
- Nesiocolpodes sloanei (Maindron, 1908) (Indonesia and Papua New Guinea)
