= Morimotoidius =

Scientific classification
- Kingdom: Animalia
- Phylum: Arthropoda
- Class: Insecta
- Order: Coleoptera
- Suborder: Adephaga
- Family: Carabidae
- Subfamily: Platyninae
- Tribe: Platynini
- Subtribe: Platynina
- Genus: Morimotoidius; Habu, 1954

Subgenera
- Asphodroides Habu, 1955; Morimotoidius Habu, 1954

Genus of beetles

Morimotoidius is a genus of ground beetles in the family Carabidae. There are about five described species in Morimotoidius.

== Species ==
These five species belong to the genus Morimotoidius:

- Morimotoidius astictus (Bates, 1883) (Japan)
- Morimotoidius cavicola Wang; Pang & Tian, 2016 (China)
- Morimotoidius formosus Habu, 1954 (Taiwan)
- Morimotoidius otuboi (Habu, 1944) (Japan)
- Morimotoidius zhushandong Pang & Tian, 2014 (China)
