= Xestagonum =

Scientific classification
- Kingdom: Animalia
- Phylum: Arthropoda
- Class: Insecta
- Order: Coleoptera
- Suborder: Adephaga
- Family: Carabidae
- Subfamily: Platyninae
- Tribe: Platynini
- Subtribe: Platynina
- Genus: Xestagonum; Habu, 1978

Genus of beetles

Xestagonum is a genus of beetles in the family Carabidae, found in Asia.

== Species ==
These 144 species are members of the genus Xestagonum.

- Xestagonum ahrensi J.Schmidt, 1995
- Xestagonum alanstivelli Morvan, 1999
- Xestagonum alticola J.Schmidt, 1998
- Xestagonum ambiguum (Fairmaire, 1891)
- Xestagonum ambulator (Andrewes, 1930)
- Xestagonum arvarus Morvan, 1996
- Xestagonum assamense (Morvan, 1998)
- Xestagonum baehri J.Schmidt, 1996
- Xestagonum bellasilviae J.Schmidt, 1996
- Xestagonum benesi Morvan, 1996
- Xestagonum beskellus Morvan, 1996
- Xestagonum bhutanense (Morvan, 1982)
- Xestagonum bisetosum Morvan, 2007
- Xestagonum blevdispar Morvan, 2007
- Xestagonum blevennek Morvan, 1998
- Xestagonum bochkrizet Morvan, 1999
- Xestagonum bothoreli Morvan, 1999
- Xestagonum boulbeni Morvan, 2007
- Xestagonum brancuccianum Morvan, 2007
- Xestagonum brancuccii J.Schmidt, 1997
- Xestagonum brunicolle J.Schmidt, 1995
- Xestagonum brunisianum Morvan & Tian, 2003
- Xestagonum bruskhir Morvan, 2007
- Xestagonum bruskornekus Morvan, 1996
- Xestagonum bureli (Morvan, 1995)
- Xestagonum caesitium (Andrewes, 1924)
- Xestagonum cavazzutii Morvan, 1998
- Xestagonum chensicieni (Kryzhanovskij, 1994)
- Xestagonum convexicolle J.Schmidt, 1997
- Xestagonum cursor (Andrewes, 1930)
- Xestagonum daisetsuzanum (Nakane, 1963)
- Xestagonum damhenvel Morvan, 2007
- Xestagonum damkenlinenn Morvan, 2010
- Xestagonum danteg Morvan, 2004
- Xestagonum daoublev Morvan, 1999
- Xestagonum dentatum Morvan, 2002
- Xestagonum deuvei (Morvan, 1995)
- Xestagonum deuvesianum (Morvan, 1995)
- Xestagonum dierli (Jedlicka, 1966)
- Xestagonum disjunctum J.Schmidt, 2003
- Xestagonum diversicolle J.Schmidt, 1995
- Xestagonum dobbertini J.Schmidt, 1998
- Xestagonum dremmi (Morvan, 1995)
- Xestagonum dreuxi (Jedlicka, 1968)
- Xestagonum elytroplanum Morvan, 2004
- Xestagonum erberi Morvan, 2007
- Xestagonum etainn Morvan, 1996
- Xestagonum etredaou Morvan, 2004
- Xestagonum forchellek Morvan, 2004
- Xestagonum ganesh Morvan, 1996
- Xestagonum garig Morvan, 2004
- Xestagonum gellkistinus Morvan, 1996
- Xestagonum gorapaniense (Habu, 1973)
- Xestagonum gouzougek Morvan, 2004
- Xestagonum gracile Morvan, 2007
- Xestagonum gracilipenne Morvan, 2007
- Xestagonum grandistyle J.Schmidt, 1996
- Xestagonum habui J.Schmidt, 1996
- Xestagonum hannesi J.Schmidt, 2003
- Xestagonum heinzi Morvan, 2007
- Xestagonum henvelikus Morvan, 1996
- Xestagonum himalayae (Habu, 1973)
- Xestagonum holzschuhi Morvan, 1996
- Xestagonum holzschuhianum Morvan, 1996
- Xestagonum immarginatum J.Schmidt, 1997
- Xestagonum inexspectatum (Kryzhanovskij, 1994)
- Xestagonum izeldoareus Morvan, 1996
- Xestagonum izil Morvan, 2004
- Xestagonum jannuense (Jedlicka, 1968)
- Xestagonum jitiangense Morvan, 2007
- Xestagonum kalchmoanus Morvan, 1996
- Xestagonum kamareti (Morvan, 1995)
- Xestagonum kamaretianum (Morvan, 1995)
- Xestagonum kaonastennus (Morvan, 1995)
- Xestagonum karli J.Schmidt, 1998
- Xestagonum karvanekus Morvan, 1996
- Xestagonum kemm Morvan, 1999
- Xestagonum kergreni Morvan, 1999
- Xestagonum keridwen (Morvan, 1995)
- Xestagonum kildroennus (Morvan, 1995)
- Xestagonum kompeskanus (Morvan, 1995)
- Xestagonum korr Morvan, 1999
- Xestagonum kucerai Morvan, 2004
- Xestagonum kuceraianum Morvan, 2007
- Xestagonum kuzonduresti (Morvan, 1995)
- Xestagonum lagadbihan Morvan, 1999
- Xestagonum lassallei (Morvan, 1995)
- Xestagonum lassalleianum (Morvan, 1995)
- Xestagonum lateromarginale (Casale, 1980)
- Xestagonum ledouxi Morvan, 2007
- Xestagonum lehirae Morvan, 1999
- Xestagonum marani (Jedlicka, 1968)
- Xestagonum marginale Morvan, 1999
- Xestagonum marietudoe Morvan, 2007
- Xestagonum meindli J.Schmidt, 2003
- Xestagonum melittus (Bates, 1889)
- Xestagonum meneziadus Morvan, 1996
- Xestagonum meyeri (Jedlicka, 1934)
- Xestagonum modron (Morvan, 1995)
- Xestagonum montuosellum J.Schmidt, 1998
- Xestagonum montuosum (Habu, 1973)
- Xestagonum morholt Morvan, 1996
- Xestagonum musculum (Jedlicka, 1965)
- Xestagonum naviauxi (Morvan, 1995)
- Xestagonum nazarovi (Lafer, 1976)
- Xestagonum nepalense (Jedlicka, 1965)
- Xestagonum nitouense (Jedlicka, 1934)
- Xestagonum nivium (Bates, 1891)
- Xestagonum ovaliceps (Bates, 1878)
- Xestagonum pavruzus Morvan, 1996
- Xestagonum pellgar Morvan, 2010
- Xestagonum pennboullek Morvan, 1999
- Xestagonum pennekus (Morvan, 1995)
- Xestagonum rectangulum Morvan & Tian, 2003
- Xestagonum remondi Morvan, 1999
- Xestagonum rhiannon Morvan, 1996
- Xestagonum robustum Morvan, 2007
- Xestagonum ruteri (Morvan, 1972)
- Xestagonum sabinae J.Schmidt, 2003
- Xestagonum semicoeruleum J.Schmidt, 1995
- Xestagonum semivariolosum Morvan & Tian, 2003
- Xestagonum shimomurai Morvan, 1996
- Xestagonum shimomuraianum (Morvan, 1995)
- Xestagonum shokhrini Sundukov, 2013
- Xestagonum sikkimense Morvan, 1998
- Xestagonum skoazigus Morvan, 1996
- Xestagonum skoazkornek Morvan, 1999
- Xestagonum smetanai Morvan, 1996
- Xestagonum soazigae Morvan, 1999
- Xestagonum stummuis (Morvan, 1995)
- Xestagonum szekessyi (Jedlicka, 1960)
- Xestagonum tetrasetosum (Habu, 1973)
- Xestagonum tharepatiense (Habu, 1973)
- Xestagonum thierryi J.Schmidt, 2001
- Xestagonum tibetanum Morvan, 2002
- Xestagonum torgos Morvan, 1998
- Xestagonum treutikus Morvan, 1996
- Xestagonum unisetosum Morvan & Tian, 2003
- Xestagonum ursulae J.Schmidt, 1998
- Xestagonum venator (Andrewes, 1930)
- Xestagonum vignai J.Schmidt, 1998
- Xestagonum viridicans (Andrewes, 1926)
- Xestagonum xestus (Bates, 1883)
- Xestagonum zenganinae Morvan & Tian, 2003
