= Idiagonum =

Scientific classification
- Domain: Eukaryota
- Kingdom: Animalia
- Phylum: Arthropoda
- Class: Insecta
- Order: Coleoptera
- Suborder: Adephaga
- Family: Carabidae
- Subfamily: Platyninae
- Tribe: Platynini
- Subtribe: Platynina
- Genus: Idiagonum; Darlington, 1952

Genus of beetles

Idiagonum is a genus of ground beetles in the family Carabidae. There are about 16 described species in Idiagonum.

== Species ==
These 16 species belong to the genus Idiagonum:

- Idiagonum asperius Darlington, 1952 (New Guinea)
- Idiagonum asperum Darlington, 1952 (New Guinea)
- Idiagonum capellae Baehr, 2012 (Indonesia, New Guinea, and Papua)
- Idiagonum darlingtoni Baehr, 2000 (Indonesia and New Guinea)
- Idiagonum eliti Baehr, 2000 (Indonesia and New Guinea)
- Idiagonum giluwe Darlington, 1971 (New Guinea)
- Idiagonum inasperum Darlington, 1952 (Indonesia and New Guinea)
- Idiagonum latius Baehr, 2000 (Indonesia and New Guinea)
- Idiagonum limatulum Darlington, 1971 (New Guinea)
- Idiagonum longipenne Baehr, 2000 (Indonesia and New Guinea)
- Idiagonum macrocephalum Baehr, 2000 (New Guinea)
- Idiagonum muscorum Darlington, 1952 (Indonesia and New Guinea)
- Idiagonum opacicolle Baehr, 2000 (Indonesia and New Guinea)
- Idiagonum riedeli Baehr, 2000 (Indonesia and New Guinea)
- Idiagonum sinuatipenne Baehr, 2000 (Indonesia and New Guinea)
- Idiagonum wapenamandae Baehr, 2000 (New Guinea)
