= Skouedhirraad =

Scientific classification
- Domain: Eukaryota
- Kingdom: Animalia
- Phylum: Arthropoda
- Class: Insecta
- Order: Coleoptera
- Suborder: Adephaga
- Family: Carabidae
- Subfamily: Platyninae
- Tribe: Platynini
- Subtribe: Platynina
- Genus: Skouedhirraad; Morvan, 1999

Genus of beetles

Skouedhirraad is a genus of ground beetles in the family Carabidae. There are at least two described species in Skouedhirraad, found in India.

== Species ==
These two species belong to the genus Skouedhirraad:

- Skouedhirraad kucerai Morvan, 2004
- Skouedhirraad sikkimensis Morvan, 1999
