= Archagonum =

Scientific classification
- Domain: Eukaryota
- Kingdom: Animalia
- Phylum: Arthropoda
- Class: Insecta
- Order: Coleoptera
- Suborder: Adephaga
- Family: Carabidae
- Subfamily: Platyninae
- Tribe: Platynini
- Subtribe: Platynina
- Genus: Archagonum; Basilewsky, 1953

Genus of beetles

Archagonum is a genus of beetles in the family Carabidae, containing the following species:

- Archagonum dichroum (Putzeys, 1880)
- Archagonum hirtum (Raffray, 1886)
