= Liocolpodes =

Scientific classification
- Domain: Eukaryota
- Kingdom: Animalia
- Phylum: Arthropoda
- Class: Insecta
- Order: Coleoptera
- Suborder: Adephaga
- Family: Carabidae
- Subfamily: Platyninae
- Tribe: Platynini
- Subtribe: Platynina
- Genus: Liocolpodes; Basilewsky, 1985

Genus of beetles

Liocolpodes is a genus of ground beetles in the family Carabidae. There are at least three described species in Liocolpodes, found in Madagascar.

== Species ==
These three species belong to the genus Liocolpodes:

- Liocolpodes caraboides (Alluaud, 1909)
- Liocolpodes perspinosus Basilewsky, 1985
- Liocolpodes spinosus Basilewsky, 1985
