= Bothrocolpodes =

Scientific classification
- Domain: Eukaryota
- Kingdom: Animalia
- Phylum: Arthropoda
- Class: Insecta
- Order: Coleoptera
- Suborder: Adephaga
- Family: Carabidae
- Subfamily: Platyninae
- Tribe: Platynini
- Subtribe: Platynina
- Genus: Bothrocolpodes; Basilewsky, 1985

Genus of beetles

Bothrocolpodes is a genus of beetles in the family Carabidae, found in Madagascar.

== Species ==
These species are members of the genus Bothrocolpodes.

- Bothrocolpodes fossulatus (Jeannel, 1948)
- Bothrocolpodes manjarivoloanus Basilewsky, 1985
- Bothrocolpodes rudis (Alluaud, 1909)
- Bothrocolpodes splendens Basilewsky, 1985
