= Mesocolpodes =

Scientific classification
- Domain: Eukaryota
- Kingdom: Animalia
- Phylum: Arthropoda
- Class: Insecta
- Order: Coleoptera
- Suborder: Adephaga
- Family: Carabidae
- Subfamily: Platyninae
- Tribe: Platynini
- Subtribe: Platynina
- Genus: Mesocolpodes; Basilewsky, 1985
- Species: M. coptoderoides

Binomial name
- Mesocolpodes coptoderoides (Jeannel, 1957)

Genus of beetles

Mesocolpodes is a genus of ground beetles in the family Carabidae. This genus has a single species, Mesocolpodes coptoderoides. It is found in Mauritius.
