= Arhytinus =

Scientific classification
- Domain: Eukaryota
- Kingdom: Animalia
- Phylum: Arthropoda
- Class: Insecta
- Order: Coleoptera
- Suborder: Adephaga
- Family: Carabidae
- Subfamily: Platyninae
- Tribe: Platynini
- Subtribe: Platynina
- Genus: Arhytinus; Henry Walter Bates, 1889

Genus of beetles

Arhytinus is a genus in the beetle family Carabidae. There are more than 50 described species in Arhytinus.

== Species ==
These 53 species belong to the genus Arhytinus:

- Arhytinus angustibasis Baehr & J.Schmidt, 2010 (Indonesia and Borneo)
- Arhytinus angustimargo Baehr, 2010 (Malaysia, Indonesia, and Borneo)
- Arhytinus atripennis Baehr, 2012 (Indonesia)
- Arhytinus baliensis Baehr, 2012 (Indonesia)
- Arhytinus bastai Baehr, 2014 (Malaysia)
- Arhytinus bembidioides Bates, 1889 (India, Myanmar, Vietnam, Indonesia, Borneo)
- Arhytinus borcherdingi Baehr, 2010 (Malaysia, Indonesia, and Borneo)
- Arhytinus brendelli Baehr & J.Schmidt, 2010 (Indonesia)
- Arhytinus bulirschi Baehr, 2014 (Malaysia)
- Arhytinus cechovskyi Baehr, 2014 (Malaysia)
- Arhytinus celebensis Baehr, 2010 (Indonesia)
- Arhytinus circumcinctus Baehr, 2010 (Myanmar and Thailand)
- Arhytinus cordicollis Baehr, 2010 (Indonesia and Borneo)
- Arhytinus crenulipennis Baehr, 2010 (Indonesia and Borneo)
- Arhytinus darlingtoni Baehr, 2012 (Philippines)
- Arhytinus flavomarginatus Baehr, 2014 (Vietnam)
- Arhytinus frater Baehr, 2010 (Indonesia and New Guinea)
- Arhytinus gerdi Baehr & J.Schmidt, 2010 (China)
- Arhytinus gerstmeieri Baehr, 2016 (Vietnam)
- Arhytinus granum Darlington, 1952 (New Guinea and Papua)
- Arhytinus hammondi Baehr & J.Schmidt, 2010 (Malaysia)
- Arhytinus harpago Baehr, 2010 (Indonesia and Borneo)
- Arhytinus inarmatus Baehr, 2010 (Indonesia)
- Arhytinus indicus Baehr, 2010 (India)
- Arhytinus irideus Jedlicka, 1936 (Philippines)
- Arhytinus javanus Baehr, 2012 (Indonesia)
- Arhytinus leytensis Baehr & J.Schmidt, 2010 (Philippines)
- Arhytinus lieftincki Louwerens, 1951 (Indonesia)
- Arhytinus lorenzi Baehr, 2010 (India)
- Arhytinus ludewigi Baehr, 2012
- Arhytinus major Darlington, 1952 (New Guinea and Papua)
- Arhytinus maximus Baehr, 2014 (Vietnam)
- Arhytinus medius Darlington, 1952 (Indonesia, New Guinea, and Papua)
- Arhytinus minimus Jedlicka, 1936 (Philippines)
- Arhytinus minor Baehr, 2010 (New Guinea and Papua)
- Arhytinus missai Baehr, 2010 (New Guinea and Papua)
- Arhytinus moluccensis Baehr, 2010 (Indonesia)
- Arhytinus multispinosus Baehr, 2010 (Malaysia, Indonesia, and Borneo)
- Arhytinus nepalensis Baehr & J.Schmidt, 2010 (Nepal)
- Arhytinus nitescens Baehr, 2010 (Taiwan)
- Arhytinus nitidipennis Baehr, 2010 (Indonesia and Borneo)
- Arhytinus novaeirlandiae Baehr, 2010 (New Guinea and Papua)
- Arhytinus philippinus Jedlicka, 1936 (Philippines)
- Arhytinus piceus Jedlicka, 1936 (Philippines)
- Arhytinus punctibasis Baehr, 2018 (Vietnam)
- Arhytinus riedeli Baehr, 2010 (Indonesia)
- Arhytinus sumatrensis Baehr, 2010 (Indonesia)
- Arhytinus taiwanensis Baehr, 2010 (Taiwan)
- Arhytinus timorensis Baehr, 2017 (Indonesia)
- Arhytinus unispinus Baehr, 2010 (New Guinea and Papua)
- Arhytinus vietnamensis Baehr, 2014 (Vietnam)
- Arhytinus weigeli Baehr, 2014 (Vietnam)
- Arhytinus yunnanus Baehr, 2012 (China)
