= Plicagonum =

Scientific classification
- Domain: Eukaryota
- Kingdom: Animalia
- Phylum: Arthropoda
- Class: Insecta
- Order: Coleoptera
- Suborder: Adephaga
- Family: Carabidae
- Subfamily: Platyninae
- Tribe: Platynini
- Subtribe: Platynina
- Genus: Plicagonum; Darlington, 1952

Genus of beetles

Plicagonum is a genus of ground beetles in the family Carabidae. There are at least three described species in Plicagonum, found in Indonesia and Papua New Guinea.

== Species ==
These three species belong to the genus Plicagonum:

- Plicagonum fulvum Darlington, 1952
- Plicagonum kaindi Darlington, 1971
- Plicagonum rugifrons Darlington, 1952
