= Laevagonum =

Scientific classification
- Domain: Eukaryota
- Kingdom: Animalia
- Phylum: Arthropoda
- Class: Insecta
- Order: Coleoptera
- Suborder: Adephaga
- Family: Carabidae
- Subfamily: Platyninae
- Tribe: Platynini
- Subtribe: Platynina
- Genus: Laevagonum; Darlington, 1952

Genus of beetles

Laevagonum is a genus of ground beetles in the family Carabidae. There are about 10 described species in Laevagonum, found on New Guinea.

== Species ==
These 10 species belong to the genus Laevagonum:

- Laevagonum alticola Baehr, 2012
- Laevagonum cistelum Darlington, 1952
- Laevagonum citum Darlington, 1952
- Laevagonum frustum Darlington, 1971
- Laevagonum giluwe Darlington, 1971
- Laevagonum huon Baehr, 2012
- Laevagonum parafrustum Baehr, 2012
- Laevagonum pertenue Darlington, 1971
- Laevagonum subcistelum Darlington, 1952
- Laevagonum subcitum Darlington, 1952
