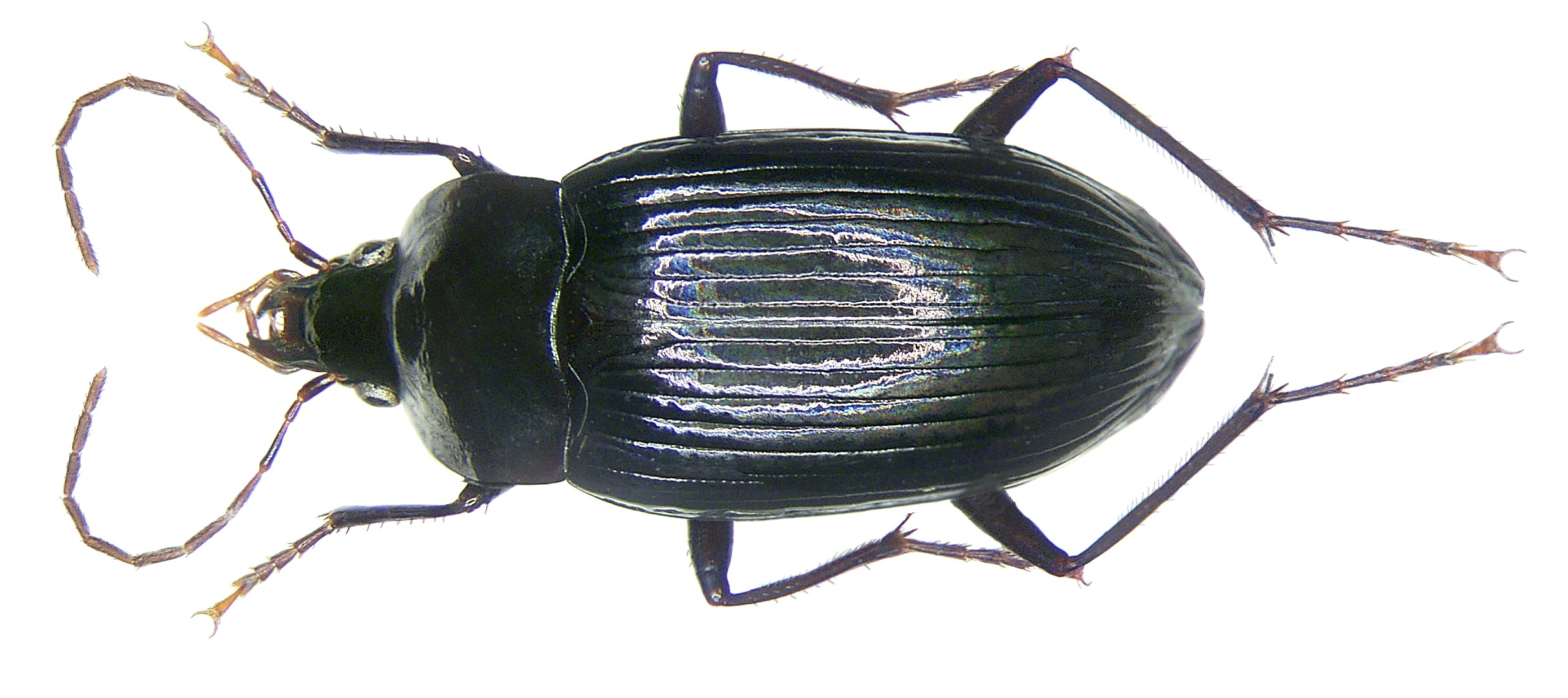
- Fortagonum skalei

Scientific classification
- Domain: Eukaryota
- Kingdom: Animalia
- Phylum: Arthropoda
- Class: Insecta
- Order: Coleoptera
- Suborder: Adephaga
- Family: Carabidae
- Subfamily: Platyninae
- Tribe: Platynini
- Subtribe: Platynina
- Genus: Fortagonum; Darlington, 1952

= Fortagonum =

Genus of beetles

Fortagonum is a genus in the beetle family Carabidae. There are more than 20 described species in Fortagonum, found in Indonesia and New Guinea.

== Species ==
These 29 species belong to the genus Fortagonum:

- Fortagonum acuticolle Baehr, 1995 (Indonesia and New Guinea)
- Fortagonum antecessor Darlington, 1971 (New Guinea)
- Fortagonum bigenum (Darlington, 1971) (New Guinea)
- Fortagonum bisetosiceps Baehr, 1995 (Indonesia and New Guinea)
- Fortagonum bufo Darlington, 1952 (Indonesia and New Guinea)
- Fortagonum curtum Baehr, 1992 (Indonesia and New Guinea)
- Fortagonum cychriceps Darlington, 1952 (Indonesia and New Guinea)
- Fortagonum denticulatum Baehr, 1995 (Indonesia and New Guinea)
- Fortagonum depressum Baehr, 1995 (Indonesia and New Guinea)
- Fortagonum forceps Darlington, 1952 (Indonesia and New Guinea)
- Fortagonum formiceps Darlington, 1971 (Indonesia and New Guinea)
- Fortagonum fortellum Darlington, 1952 (New Guinea)
- Fortagonum globulipenne Baehr, 1997 (Indonesia and New Guinea)
- Fortagonum hornabrookianum Baehr, 2001 (New Guinea)
- Fortagonum insulare Baehr, 2001 (Indonesia and New Guinea)
- Fortagonum laevigatum Baehr, 1997 (Indonesia and New Guinea)
- Fortagonum laevissimum Baehr, 2001 (New Guinea)
- Fortagonum latum Baehr, 1995 (Indonesia and New Guinea)
- Fortagonum longispinum Baehr, 2012 (New Guinea and Papua)
- Fortagonum okapa Darlington, 1971 (New Guinea)
- Fortagonum oodinum Darlington, 1971 (New Guinea)
- Fortagonum sinak Baehr, 1997 (Indonesia and New Guinea)
- Fortagonum skalei Baehr, 2008 (Indonesia and New Guinea)
- Fortagonum spinipenne Baehr, 1997 (Indonesia and New Guinea)
- Fortagonum spinosum Baehr, 1995 (Indonesia and New Guinea)
- Fortagonum subconicolle (Darlington, 1971) (Indonesia and New Guinea)
- Fortagonum substriatum Baehr, 2001 (New Guinea)
- Fortagonum sulcipenne Baehr, 2012 (Indonesia and New Guinea)
- Fortagonum unipunctatum Baehr, 1995 (Indonesia and New Guinea)
