= Lassalleianum =

Scientific classification
- Domain: Eukaryota
- Kingdom: Animalia
- Phylum: Arthropoda
- Class: Insecta
- Order: Coleoptera
- Suborder: Adephaga
- Family: Carabidae
- Subfamily: Platyninae
- Tribe: Platynini
- Subtribe: Platynina
- Genus: Lassalleianum; Morvan, 1999

Genus of beetles

Lassalleianum is a genus of ground beetles in the family Carabidae. There are at least two described species in Lassalleianum, found in Nepal.

== Species ==
These two species belong to the genus Lassalleianum:

- Lassalleianum damhenvel Morvan, 1999
- Lassalleianum lassallei Morvan, 1999
