= Hemiplatynus =

Scientific classification
- Kingdom: Animalia
- Phylum: Arthropoda
- Class: Insecta
- Order: Coleoptera
- Suborder: Adephaga
- Family: Carabidae
- Subfamily: Platyninae
- Tribe: Platynini
- Subtribe: Platynina
- Genus: Hemiplatynus; Casey, 1920
- Species: H. chihuahuae

Binomial name
- Hemiplatynus chihuahuae (Bates, 1884)

Genus of beetles

Hemiplatynus chihuahuae is a species of beetle in the family Carabidae, the only species in the genus Hemiplatynus.
