= Ponapagonum =

Scientific classification
- Domain: Eukaryota
- Kingdom: Animalia
- Phylum: Arthropoda
- Class: Insecta
- Order: Coleoptera
- Suborder: Adephaga
- Family: Carabidae
- Subfamily: Platyninae
- Tribe: Platynini
- Subtribe: Platynina
- Genus: Ponapagonum; Darlington, 1970

Genus of beetles

Ponapagonum is a genus of beetles in the family Carabidae, containing the following species:

- Ponapagonum dybasi Darlington, 1970
- Ponapagonum pairoti Darlington, 1970
