= Euleptus =

Scientific classification
- Domain: Eukaryota
- Kingdom: Animalia
- Phylum: Arthropoda
- Class: Insecta
- Order: Coleoptera
- Suborder: Adephaga
- Family: Carabidae
- Subfamily: Platyninae
- Tribe: Platynini
- Subtribe: Platynina
- Genus: Euleptus; Klug, 1833

Genus of beetles

Euleptus is a genus of beetles in the family Carabidae, containing the following species:

- Euleptus albicornis Kolbe, 1889
- Euleptus caffer Boheman, 1848
- Euleptus coriacea Habu, 1973
- Euleptus foveolatus Kolbe, 1889
- Euleptus geniculatus Klug, 1833
- Euleptus intermedius Peringuey, 1896
- Euleptus jeanneli Burgeon, 1935
- Euleptus kilimanus Basilewsky, 1962
- Euleptus ooderus Chaudoir, 1850
- Euleptus paganus Kuntzen, 1919
- Euleptus peringueyi Csiki, 1931
- Euleptus virens Gestro, 1895
- Euleptus zuluanus (Barker, 1922)
