= Celaenagonum =

Scientific classification
- Kingdom: Animalia
- Phylum: Arthropoda
- Class: Insecta
- Order: Coleoptera
- Suborder: Adephaga
- Family: Carabidae
- Subfamily: Platyninae
- Tribe: Platynini
- Subtribe: Platynina
- Genus: Celaenagonum; Habu, 1978

Genus of beetles

Celaenagonum is a genus of ground beetles in the family Carabidae. There are about eight described species in Celaenagonum, found in Asia.

== Species ==
These eight species belong to the genus Celaenagonum:

- Celaenagonum angulum Morvan, 2006 (China)
- Celaenagonum deuvei (Morvan, 1999) (China)
- Celaenagonum eurydamas (Bates, 1883) (Japan)
- Celaenagonum kesharishresthae Morvan, 1999 (Nepal)
- Celaenagonum kucerai Morvan, 2002 (India)
- Celaenagonum mantillerii Morvan, 2006 (China)
- Celaenagonum obesum Morvan & Tian, 2001 (China)
- Celaenagonum pangxiongfeii Morvan & Tian, 2001 (China)
