= Vitagonum =

Scientific classification
- Domain: Eukaryota
- Kingdom: Animalia
- Phylum: Arthropoda
- Class: Insecta
- Order: Coleoptera
- Suborder: Adephaga
- Family: Carabidae
- Subfamily: Platyninae
- Tribe: Platynini
- Subtribe: Platynina
- Genus: Vitagonum; B.Moore, 1999
- Species: V. apterum

Binomial name
- Vitagonum apterum B.Moore, 1999

Genus of beetles

Vitagonum is a genus of ground beetles in the family Carabidae. This genus has a single species, Vitagonum apterum. It is found in Fiji.
