= Lorostema =

Scientific classification
- Kingdom: Animalia
- Phylum: Arthropoda
- Class: Insecta
- Order: Coleoptera
- Suborder: Adephaga
- Family: Carabidae
- Subfamily: Platyninae
- Tribe: Platynini
- Subtribe: Platynina
- Genus: Lorostema; Motschulsky, 1865

Genus of beetles

Lorostema is a genus of ground beetles in the family Carabidae. There are about six described species in Lorostema.

== Species ==
These six species belong to the genus Lorostema:

- Lorostema alutacea Motschulsky, 1865 (worldwide)
- Lorostema bothriophora (L.Redtenbacher, 1868) (Australia, New Caledonia, Samoa, Tahiti, and Vanuatu)
- Lorostema informalis Darlington, 1952 (Indonesia and New Guinea)
- Lorostema interstitialis Jedlicka, 1935 (Philippines)
- Lorostema ogurae (Bates, 1883) (Japan)
- Lorostema subnitens Andrewes, 1929 (Indonesia)
