= Habragonum =

Scientific classification
- Kingdom: Animalia
- Phylum: Arthropoda
- Class: Insecta
- Order: Coleoptera
- Suborder: Adephaga
- Family: Carabidae
- Subfamily: Platyninae
- Tribe: Platynini
- Subtribe: Platynina
- Genus: Habragonum; Ueno, 1964
- Species: H. amamioshimense

Binomial name
- Habragonum amamioshimense (Habu, 1955)

Genus of beetles

Habragonum amamioshimense is a species of beetle in the family Carabidae, the only species in the genus Habragonum.
