= Pachyferonia =

Scientific classification
- Domain: Eukaryota
- Kingdom: Animalia
- Phylum: Arthropoda
- Class: Insecta
- Order: Coleoptera
- Suborder: Adephaga
- Family: Carabidae
- Subfamily: Platyninae
- Tribe: Platynini
- Subtribe: Platynina
- Genus: Pachyferonia; Jeannel, 1951
- Species: P. quadricollis

Binomial name
- Pachyferonia quadricollis Jeannel, 1951

Genus of beetles

Pachyferonia is a genus of ground beetles in the family Carabidae. This genus has a single species, Pachyferonia quadricollis. It is found in Madagascar.
