= Incagonum =

Scientific classification
- Kingdom: Animalia
- Phylum: Arthropoda
- Class: Insecta
- Order: Coleoptera
- Suborder: Adephaga
- Family: Carabidae
- Subfamily: Platyninae
- Tribe: Platynini
- Subtribe: Platynina
- Genus: Incagonum; Liebherr, 1994

Genus of beetles

Incagonum is a genus of ground beetles in the family Carabidae. There are more than 20 described species in Incagonum, found in South America.

== Species ==
These 25 species belong to the genus Incagonum:

- Incagonum aeneum (Reiche, 1843) (Colombia, Ecuador, and Peru)
- Incagonum ambiguum (Solier, 1849) (Chile)
- Incagonum andicola (Bates, 1891) (Ecuador and Peru)
- Incagonum angulatum (Chaudoir, 1854) (Brazil)
- Incagonum bonariense (Gemminger & Harold, 1868) (Argentina)
- Incagonum brasiliense (Dejean, 1828) (Brazil)
- Incagonum chilense (Dejean, 1831) (Chile)
- Incagonum circumdatum (Erichson, 1834) (Chile)
- Incagonum cordicolle (Solier, 1849) (Chile)
- Incagonum dejeani (Solier, 1849) (Chile)
- Incagonum discosulcatum (Dejean, 1828) (Argentina)
- Incagonum fuscoaeneum (Gemminger & Harold, 1868) (Argentina)
- Incagonum gayi (Solier, 1849) (Chile)
- Incagonum hiekei Allegro; Giachino & Moret, 2016 (Peru)
- Incagonum inca (Moret, 1994) (Peru)
- Incagonum laevicolle (Solier, 1849) (Chile)
- Incagonum lineatopunctatum (Dejean, 1831) (Argentina)
- Incagonum lucidum Allegro; Giachino & Moret, 2016 (Peru)
- Incagonum mateui (Moret, 1994) (Peru)
- Incagonum melas (Solier, 1849) (Argentina and Chile)
- Incagonum opacum Allegro; Giachino & Moret, 2016 (Peru)
- Incagonum pedestre (Putzeys, 1878) (Colombia)
- Incagonum peruvianum Allegro; Giachino & Moret, 2016 (Peru)
- Incagonum quadricolle (Dejean, 1828) (Argentina)
- Incagonum semistriatum (Fairmaire, 1884) (Argentina)
