= Liamegalonychus =

Scientific classification
- Domain: Eukaryota
- Kingdom: Animalia
- Phylum: Arthropoda
- Class: Insecta
- Order: Coleoptera
- Suborder: Adephaga
- Family: Carabidae
- Subfamily: Platyninae
- Tribe: Platynini
- Subtribe: Platynina
- Genus: Liamegalonychus; Basilewsky, 1963

Genus of beetles

Liamegalonychus is a genus of ground beetles in the family Carabidae. There are about eight described species in Liamegalonychus, found in Africa.

== Species ==
These eight species belong to the genus Liamegalonychus:

- Liamegalonychus alluaudi (Burgeon, 1935) (Kenya and Uganda)
- Liamegalonychus bambusicola (Basilewsky, 1954) (Kenya and Uganda)
- Liamegalonychus buxtoni (Burgeon, 1935) (Democratic Republic of the Congo and Uganda)
- Liamegalonychus cratericola (Burgeon, 1935) (Kenya and Uganda)
- Liamegalonychus diversus (Péringuey, 1896) (South Africa)
- Liamegalonychus ericarum (Burgeon, 1935) (Kenya and Uganda)
- Liamegalonychus niger (Basilewsky, 1950) (South Africa)
- Liamegalonychus oblongus (Boheman, 1848) (South Africa and Zimbabwe)
