= Tostkar =

Scientific classification
- Domain: Eukaryota
- Kingdom: Animalia
- Phylum: Arthropoda
- Class: Insecta
- Order: Coleoptera
- Suborder: Adephaga
- Family: Carabidae
- Subfamily: Platyninae
- Tribe: Platynini
- Subtribe: Platynina
- Genus: Tostkar; Morvan, 1998

Genus of beetles

Tostkar is a genus of ground beetles in the family Carabidae. There are about five described species in Tostkar, found in Nepal.

== Species ==
These five species belong to the genus Tostkar:

- Tostkar daoulivek Morvan, 1998
- Tostkar deuvei Morvan, 1998
- Tostkar kumatai (Habu, 1973)
- Tostkar nepalensis Morvan, 1998
- Tostkar tev Morvan, 1998
