= Maculagonum =

Scientific classification
- Domain: Eukaryota
- Kingdom: Animalia
- Phylum: Arthropoda
- Class: Insecta
- Order: Coleoptera
- Suborder: Adephaga
- Family: Carabidae
- Subfamily: Platyninae
- Tribe: Platynini
- Subtribe: Platynina
- Genus: Maculagonum; Darlington, 1952

Genus of beetles

Maculagonum is a genus of ground beetles in the family Carabidae. There are at least 20 described species in Maculagonum, found in Indonesia and Papua New Guinea.

== Species ==
These 20 species belong to the genus Maculagonum:

- Maculagonum altipox Darlington, 1952
- Maculagonum atropox Darlington, 1971
- Maculagonum canipox Darlington, 1971
- Maculagonum coeruleipenne Baehr, 2018
- Maculagonum daymanpox Darlington, 1971
- Maculagonum depilapox Darlington, 1971
- Maculagonum giluwe Baehr, 2018
- Maculagonum kaindipox Darlington, 1971
- Maculagonum loebli Baehr, 2018
- Maculagonum oculare Baehr, 2018
- Maculagonum opacipenne Baehr, 2018
- Maculagonum plagipox Darlington, 1952
- Maculagonum pox Darlington, 1952
- Maculagonum quadrimaculatum Baehr, 2018
- Maculagonum riedeli Baehr, 2018
- Maculagonum scaphipox Darlington, 1952
- Maculagonum seripox Darlington, 1971
- Maculagonum setipox Darlington, 1952
- Maculagonum tafapox Darlington, 1952
- Maculagonum waupox Darlington, 1971
