= Klapperichella =

Scientific classification
- Domain: Eukaryota
- Kingdom: Animalia
- Phylum: Arthropoda
- Class: Insecta
- Order: Coleoptera
- Suborder: Adephaga
- Family: Carabidae
- Subfamily: Platyninae
- Tribe: Platynini
- Subtribe: Platynina
- Genus: Klapperichella; Jedlicka, 1956

Genus of beetles

Klapperichella is a genus of ground beetles in the family Carabidae. There are at least two described species in Klapperichella.

== Species ==
These two species belong to the genus Klapperichella:

- Klapperichella afganistana Jedlicka, 1956 (Afghanistan)
- Klapperichella melanoxantha Kryzhanovskij, 1993 (China)
