= Orophicus =

Scientific classification
- Kingdom: Animalia
- Phylum: Arthropoda
- Clade: Pancrustacea
- Class: Insecta
- Order: Coleoptera
- Suborder: Adephaga
- Family: Carabidae
- Subfamily: Platyninae
- Tribe: Platynini
- Subtribe: Platynina
- Genus: Orophicus; Alluaud, 1925

Genus of beetles

Orophicus is a genus of ground beetles in the family Carabidae.

== Distribution ==
There are at least two described species in Orophicus, found in Mauritius.

== Species ==
These two species belong to the genus Orophicus:

- Orophicus antelmei Alluaud, 1925
- Orophicus vinsoni Jeannel, 1951
