= Colpomimus =

Scientific classification
- Domain: Eukaryota
- Kingdom: Animalia
- Phylum: Arthropoda
- Class: Insecta
- Order: Coleoptera
- Suborder: Adephaga
- Family: Carabidae
- Subfamily: Platyninae
- Tribe: Platynini
- Subtribe: Platynina
- Genus: Colpomimus; Basilewsky, 1985
- Species: C. colpodoides

Binomial name
- Colpomimus colpodoides (Jeannel, 1951)

Genus of beetles

Colpomimus colpodoides is a species of beetle in the family Carabidae, the only species in the genus Colpomimus.
