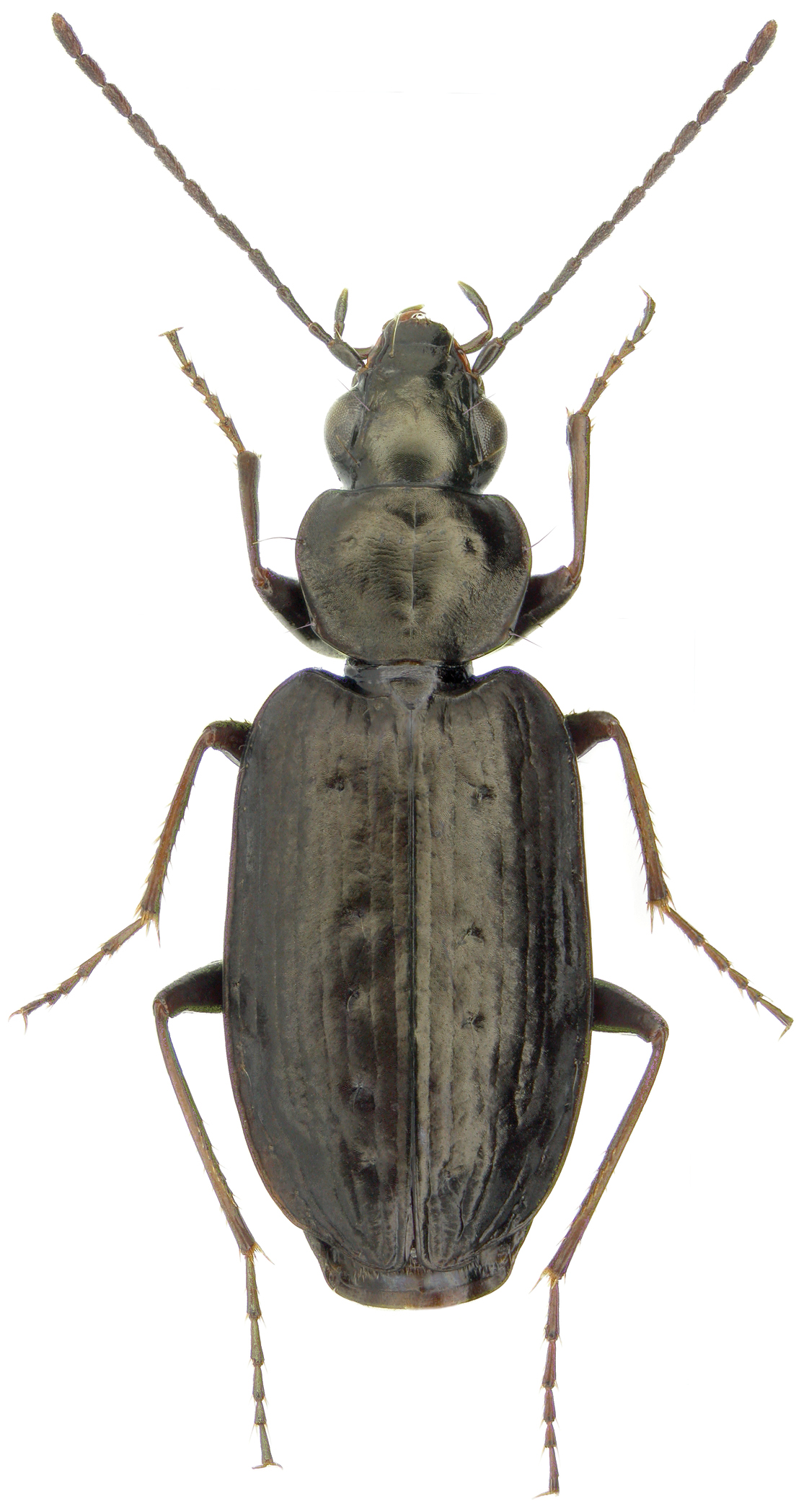
- Sericoda quadripunctata

Scientific classification
- Kingdom: Animalia
- Phylum: Arthropoda
- Clade: Pancrustacea
- Class: Insecta
- Order: Coleoptera
- Suborder: Adephaga
- Family: Carabidae
- Subfamily: Platyninae
- Tribe: Platynini; Bonelli, 1810

Genera
- See text.

= Platynini =

Tribe of beetle

Platynini is a large tribe of ground beetles in the family Carabidae. There are at least 190 genera and 3000 described species in Platynini.

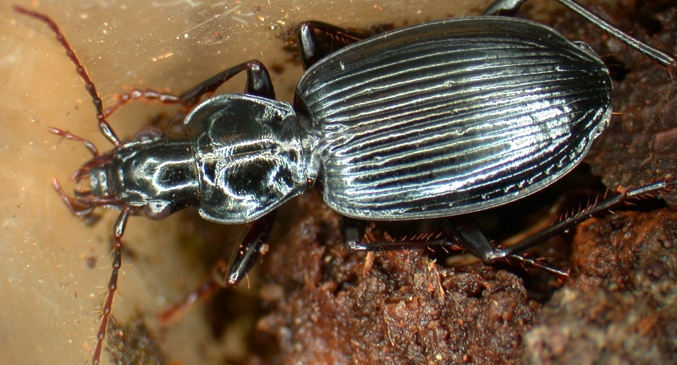
Platynus ovipennis

== Genera ==
- Abacetodes Straneo, 1939
- Achaetocephala Habu, 1975
- Achaetoprothorax Habu, 1978
- Aepsera Chaudoir, 1874
- Agelaea Gené, 1839
- Agonidium Jeannel, 1948
- Agonobembix Jeannel, 1948
- Agonoriascus Basilewsky, 1985
- Agonorites Jeannel, 1951
- Agonum Bonelli, 1810
- Altagonum Darlington, 1952
- Anchomenus Bonelli, 1810
- Andinocolpodes Perrault, 1991
- Andrewesius Andrewes, 1939
- Aparupa Andrewes, 1930
- Archagonum Basilewsky, 1953
- Archicolpodes J.Schmidt, 2001
- Arhytinus Bates, 1889
- Atranodes Jedlicka, 1953
- Atranus LeConte, 1847
- Austroglyptolenus Roig-Juñent, 2003
- Beckeria Jedlicka, 1931
- Blackburnia Sharp, 1878
- Bothrocolpodes Basilewsky, 1985
- Bruskespar Morvan, 1998
- Bruskmoal Morvan, 1998
- Bryanites Valentine, 1987
- Callidagonum Lorenz, 1998
- Cardiomera Bassi, 1834
- Catacolpodes Basilewsky, 1985
- Celaenagonum Habu, 1978
- Chaetagonum Burgeon, 1933
- Chaetosaurus J.Schmidt, 2001
- Cinctagonum Baehr, 2012
- Cistelagonum Baehr, 2012
- Collagonum Baehr, 1995
- Colpodes W.S.MacLeay, 1825
- Colpoides Jedlicka, 1931
- Colpomimus Basilewsky, 1985
- Colposphodrus Jedlicka, 1953
- Ctenognathus Fairmaire, 1843
- Cymenopterus Jeannel, 1948
- Cyrtopilus Basilewsky, 1985
- Dalatagonum Fedorenko, 2011
- Deliaesianum Morvan, 1999
- Deltocolpodes Morvan, 1992
- Dendragonum Jeannel, 1948
- Diacanthostylus Habu, 1978
- Dicranoncoides Habu, 1978
- Dicranoncus Chaudoir, 1850
- Dinocolpodes J.Schmidt, 2001
- Dirotus W.S.MacLeay, 1825
- Dister Morvan, 2006
- Dolichocolpodes Basilewsky, 1985
- Dyscolus Dejean, 1831
- Elliptoleus Bates, 1882
- Enoicus Péringuey, 1896
- Epicolpodes Basilewsky, 1985
- Eucolpodes Jeannel, 1948
- Euleptus Klug, 1833
- Euplynes Schmidt-Goebel, 1846
- Feroniascus Jeannel, 1951
- Fortagonum Darlington, 1952
- Galiciotyphlotes Assmann, 1999
- Gastragonum Darlington, 1952
- Glaucagonum Habu, 1978
- Glyptolenoides Perrault, 1991
- Glyptolenus Bates, 1878
- Gyrochaetostylus Habu, 1978
- Habragonum Ueno, 1964
- Hannaphota Landin, 1955
- Haplocolpodes Jeannel, 1951
- Haplopeza Boheman, 1848
- Helluocolpodes Liebherr, 2005
- Hemiplatynus Casey, 1920
- Henvelik Morvan, 1999
- Herculagonum Baehr, 2002
- Hikosanoagonum Habu, 1954
- Idiagonum Darlington, 1952
- Idiastes Andrewes, 1931
- Idiocolpodes Basilewsky, 1985
- Incagonum Liebherr, 1994
- Iridagonum Darlington, 1952
- Ischnagonum Kasahara & Satô, 1997
- Jocqueius Basilewsky, 1988
- Jujiroa Ueno, 1952
- Kalchdigor Morvan, 1999
- Kar Morvan, 1998
- Karnes Morvan, 2010
- Kaszabellus Jedlicka, 1954
- Kiwiplatynus Larochelle & Larivière, 2021
- Klapperichella Jedlicka, 1956
- Kuceraianum Morvan, 2002
- Kupeplatynus Larochelle & Larivière, 2021
- Laevagonum Darlington, 1952
- Lassalleianum Morvan, 1999
- Lepcha Andrewes, 1930
- Leptagonum Kolbe, 1897
- Leptocolpodes Basilewsky, 1985
- Letouzeya Bruneau de Miré, 1982
- Liagonum Jeannel, 1948
- Liamegalonychus Basilewsky, 1963
- Liocolpodes Basilewsky, 1985
- Lissagonum Habu, 1978
- Lithagonum Darlington, 1952
- Lobocolpodes Basilewsky, 1985
- Lorostema Motschulsky, 1865
- Loxocrepis Eschscholtz, 1829
- Lucicolpodes J.Schmidt, 2000
- Maculagonum Darlington, 1952
- Maoriplatynus Larochelle & Larivière, 2021
- Meleagros Kirschenhofer, 1999
- Mesocolpodes Basilewsky, 1985
- Metacolpodes Jeannel, 1948
- Mexisphodrus Barr, 1965
- Montagonum Darlington, 1952
- Mooreagonum Baehr, 2016
- Morimotoidius Habu, 1954
- Nebriagonum Darlington, 1952
- Negreum Habu, 1958
- Neobatenus Jeannel, 1948
- Neocolpodes Jeannel, 1948
- Neodendragonum Basilewsky, 1953
- Neomegalonychus Jeannel, 1948
- Nesiocolpodes Jeannel, 1948
- Nipponagonum Habu, 1978
- Notagonum Darlington, 1952
- Notocolpodes Basilewsky, 1985
- Notoplatynus B.Moore, 1985
- Nymphagonum Habu, 1978
- Olisthopus Dejean, 1828
- Oncostylus Habu, 1978
- Onotokiba Alluaud, 1927
- Onycholabis Bates, 1873
- Onypterygia Dejean, 1831
- Orophicus Alluaud, 1925
- Orthotrichus Peyron, 1856
- Oxygonium Basilewsky, 1951
- Oxypselaphus Chaudoir, 1843
- Pachybatenus Basilewsky, 1973
- Pachyferonia Jeannel, 1951
- Paracolpodes Basilewsky, 1985
- Paraliagonum Basilewsky, 1957
- Paramegalonychus Basilewsky, 1953
- Paranchodemus Habu, 1978
- Paranchus Lindroth, 1974
- Paraplatynus Baehr, 2016
- Pawgammm Morvan, 1999
- Platyagonum Habu, 1978
- Platynus Bonelli, 1810
- Plaumannium Liebke, 1939
- Plicagonum Darlington, 1952
- Ponapagonum Darlington, 1970
- Potamagonum Darlington, 1952
- Praepristus Kirschenhofer, 1999
- Promecoptera Dejean, 1831
- Promegalonychus Basilewsky, 1953
- Prophenorites Basilewsky, 1985
- Prosphodrus Britton, 1959
- Protocolpodes Basilewsky, 1985
- Pseudanchomenus Tarnier, 1860
- Pseudobatenus Basilewsky, 1951
- Pseudomegalonychus Basilewsky, 1950
- Rhadine LeConte, 1846
- Rupa Jedlicka, 1935
- Scotagonum Habu, 1978
- Sericoda Kirby, 1837
- Shibataia Habu, 1978
- Sinocolpodes J.Schmidt, 2001
- Skoeda Morvan, 1995
- Skorlagad Morvan, 1999
- Skouedhirraad Morvan, 1999
- Sophroferonia Alluaud, 1933
- Speagonum B.Moore, 1977
- Speocolpodes Barr, 1974
- Speokokosia Alluaud, 1932
- Sperkanhir Morvan, 2010
- Stenocnemus Mannerheim, 1837
- Straneoa Basilewsky, 1953
- Syletor Tschitscherine, 1899
- Takasagoagonum Habu, 1977
- Tanystoma Motschulsky, 1845
- Tarsagonum Darlington, 1952
- Tetraleucus Casey, 1920
- Tostkar Morvan, 1998
- Trogloagonum Casale, 1982
- Tuiplatynus Larochelle & Larivière, 2021
- Vitagonum B.Moore, 1999
- Vulcanophilus Heller, 1898
- Xestagonum Habu, 1978
- †Praeanchodemus Schmidt et al.
