= Henvelik =

Scientific classification
- Domain: Eukaryota
- Kingdom: Animalia
- Phylum: Arthropoda
- Class: Insecta
- Order: Coleoptera
- Suborder: Adephaga
- Family: Carabidae
- Subfamily: Platyninae
- Tribe: Platynini
- Subtribe: Platynina
- Genus: Henvelik; Morvan, 1999

Genus of beetles

Henvelik is a genus of ground beetles in the family Carabidae. There are at least two described species in Henvelik.

== Species ==
These two species belong to the genus Henvelik:

- Henvelik kalchhigenn Morvan, 1999 (Nepal)
- Henvelik kucerai Morvan, 2004 (India)
