= Syletor =

Scientific classification
- Domain: Eukaryota
- Kingdom: Animalia
- Phylum: Arthropoda
- Class: Insecta
- Order: Coleoptera
- Suborder: Adephaga
- Family: Carabidae
- Subfamily: Platyninae
- Tribe: Platynini
- Subtribe: Platynina
- Genus: Syletor; Tschitscherine, 1899
- Species: S. imerinae

Binomial name
- Syletor imerinae Tschitscherine, 1899

Genus of beetles

Syletor is a genus of ground beetles in the family Carabidae. This genus has a single species, Syletor imerinae. It is found on Reunion Island in the Indian Ocean.
