= Leptocolpodes =

Scientific classification
- Domain: Eukaryota
- Kingdom: Animalia
- Phylum: Arthropoda
- Class: Insecta
- Order: Coleoptera
- Suborder: Adephaga
- Family: Carabidae
- Subfamily: Platyninae
- Tribe: Platynini
- Subtribe: Platynina
- Genus: Leptocolpodes; Basilewsky, 1985

Genus of beetles

Leptocolpodes is a genus of ground beetles in the family Carabidae. There are about 12 described species in Leptocolpodes.

== Species ==
These 12 species belong to the genus Leptocolpodes:

- Leptocolpodes bispinosus (Jeannel, 1948) (Madagascar)
- Leptocolpodes corynoscitus (Basilewsky, 1960) (South Africa)
- Leptocolpodes erythropus (Jeannel, 1951) (Madagascar)
- Leptocolpodes leleupi (Basilewsky, 1950) (Democratic Republic of the Congo, Kenya, and Uganda)
- Leptocolpodes leroyi (Burgeon, 1937) (Democratic Republic of the Congo and Rwanda)
- Leptocolpodes mgetae (Basilewsky, 1962) (Tanzania)
- Leptocolpodes overlaeti (Burgeon, 1937) (Democratic Republic of the Congo and Ivory Coast)
- Leptocolpodes pictus (Basilewsky, 1970) (Madagascar)
- Leptocolpodes subpictus Basilewsky, 1985 (Madagascar)
- Leptocolpodes suturifer (Csiki, 1931) (South Africa)
- Leptocolpodes usambaranus (Alluaud, 1914) (Tanzania)
- Leptocolpodes velox (Péringuey, 1898) (South Africa)
