= Notoplatynus =

Scientific classification
- Domain: Eukaryota
- Kingdom: Animalia
- Phylum: Arthropoda
- Class: Insecta
- Order: Coleoptera
- Suborder: Adephaga
- Family: Carabidae
- Subfamily: Platyninae
- Tribe: Platynini
- Subtribe: Platynina
- Genus: Notoplatynus; B.Moore, 1985

Genus of beetles

Notoplatynus is a genus of ground beetles in the family Carabidae. There are at least two described species in Notoplatynus, found in Australia.

== Species ==
These two species belong to the genus Notoplatynus:

- Notoplatynus darlingtoni B.Moore, 1985
- Notoplatynus hilaris (Olliff, 1889)
