= Protocolpodes =

Scientific classification
- Domain: Eukaryota
- Kingdom: Animalia
- Phylum: Arthropoda
- Class: Insecta
- Order: Coleoptera
- Suborder: Adephaga
- Family: Carabidae
- Subfamily: Platyninae
- Tribe: Platynini
- Subtribe: Platynina
- Genus: Protocolpodes; Basilewsky, 1985
- Species: P. tratorius

Binomial name
- Protocolpodes tratorius (Basilewsky, 1970)

Genus of beetles

Protocolpodes is a genus of ground beetles in the family Carabidae. This genus has a single species, Protocolpodes tratorius. It is found in Madagascar.
