= Colposphodrus =

Scientific classification
- Domain: Eukaryota
- Kingdom: Animalia
- Phylum: Arthropoda
- Class: Insecta
- Order: Coleoptera
- Suborder: Adephaga
- Family: Carabidae
- Subfamily: Platyninae
- Tribe: Platynini
- Subtribe: Platynina
- Genus: Colposphodrus; Jedlicka, 1953
- Species: C. mirandus

Binomial name
- Colposphodrus mirandus (Jedlicka, 1940)

Genus of beetles

Colposphodrus mirandus is a species of beetle in the family Carabidae, the only species in the genus Colposphodrus.
