= Letouzeya =

Scientific classification
- Domain: Eukaryota
- Kingdom: Animalia
- Phylum: Arthropoda
- Class: Insecta
- Order: Coleoptera
- Suborder: Adephaga
- Family: Carabidae
- Subfamily: Platyninae
- Tribe: Platynini
- Subtribe: Platynina
- Genus: Letouzeya; Bruneau de Miré, 1982

Genus of beetles

Letouzeya is a genus of ground beetles in the family Carabidae. There are at least two described species in Letouzeya, found in Cameroon.

== Species ==
These two species belong to the genus Letouzeya:

- Letouzeya mirabilis Bruneau de Miré, 1982
- Letouzeya spectabilis Bruneau de Miré, 1982
