= Epicolpodes =

Scientific classification
- Domain: Eukaryota
- Kingdom: Animalia
- Phylum: Arthropoda
- Class: Insecta
- Order: Coleoptera
- Suborder: Adephaga
- Family: Carabidae
- Subfamily: Platyninae
- Tribe: Platynini
- Subtribe: Platynina
- Genus: Epicolpodes; Basilewsky, 1985

Genus of beetles

Epicolpodes is a genus in the ground beetle family Carabidae. There are about six described species in Epicolpodes, found in Madagascar.

== Species ==
These six species belong to the genus Epicolpodes:

- Epicolpodes amydrus Basilewsky, 1985
- Epicolpodes benschi (Alluaud, 1909)
- Epicolpodes juratulus Basilewsky, 1985
- Epicolpodes perviridis Basilewsky, 1985
- Epicolpodes sikorai (Alluaud, 1897)
- Epicolpodes tanala (Alluaud, 1909)
