= Aepsera =

Scientific classification
- Domain: Eukaryota
- Kingdom: Animalia
- Phylum: Arthropoda
- Class: Insecta
- Order: Coleoptera
- Suborder: Adephaga
- Family: Carabidae
- Subfamily: Platyninae
- Tribe: Platynini
- Subtribe: Platynina
- Genus: Aepsera; Chaudoir, 1874
- Species: A. ferruginea

Binomial name
- Aepsera ferruginea Chaudoir, 1874

Genus of beetles

Aepsera ferruginea is a species of beetle in the family Carabidae, the only species in the genus Aepsera.
