= Agonorites =

Scientific classification
- Domain: Eukaryota
- Kingdom: Animalia
- Phylum: Arthropoda
- Class: Insecta
- Order: Coleoptera
- Suborder: Adephaga
- Family: Carabidae
- Subfamily: Platyninae
- Tribe: Platynini
- Subtribe: Platynina
- Genus: Agonorites; Jeannel, 1951

Genus of beetles

Agonorites is a genus of beetles in the family Carabidae, containing the following species:

- Agonorites anacritus Basilewsky, 1985
- Agonorites anchomeninus (Alluaud, 1932)
- Agonorites ankaratrae (Jeannel, 1948)
- Agonorites antsifotrae Basilewsky, 1985
- Agonorites culminicola Basilewsky, 1985
- Agonorites descarpentriesi Basilewsky, 1985
- Agonorites griveaudi Basilewsky, 1985
- Agonorites jeanneli Basilewsky, 1985
- Agonorites microphthalmus (Jeannel, 1948)
- Agonorites montanus Basilewsky, 1985
- Agonorites pauliani Basilewsky, 1985
