= Promegalonychus =

Scientific classification
- Domain: Eukaryota
- Kingdom: Animalia
- Phylum: Arthropoda
- Class: Insecta
- Order: Coleoptera
- Suborder: Adephaga
- Family: Carabidae
- Subfamily: Platyninae
- Tribe: Platynini
- Subtribe: Platynina
- Genus: Promegalonychus; Basilewsky, 1953

Genus of beetles

Promegalonychus is a genus of ground beetles in the family Carabidae. There are about 11 described species in Promegalonychus, found in Africa.

== Species ==
These 11 species belong to the genus Promegalonychus:

- Promegalonychus brauneanus (Burgeon, 1933) (Burundi, Democratic Republic of the Congo, and Rwanda)
- Promegalonychus calathoides (Basilewsky, 1949) (Kenya)
- Promegalonychus clarkei Basilewsky, 1975 (Ethiopia)
- Promegalonychus decumanus Basilewsky, 1960 (Democratic Republic of the Congo)
- Promegalonychus fageli Basilewsky, 1953 (Democratic Republic of the Congo)
- Promegalonychus frantonius Basilewsky, 1985 (Cameroon)
- Promegalonychus kivuensis (Burgeon, 1933) (Democratic Republic of the Congo and Rwanda)
- Promegalonychus oribates (Alluaud, 1917) (Kenya)
- Promegalonychus pauliani (Burgeon, 1942) (Cameroon)
- Promegalonychus ruwenzoricus (Burgeon, 1933) (Democratic Republic of the Congo and Uganda)
- Promegalonychus sphodroides Basilewsky, 1975 (Ethiopia)
