= Achaetocephala =

Scientific classification
- Kingdom: Animalia
- Phylum: Arthropoda
- Class: Insecta
- Order: Coleoptera
- Suborder: Adephaga
- Family: Carabidae
- Subfamily: Platyninae
- Tribe: Platynini
- Subtribe: Platynina
- Genus: Achaetocephala; Habu, 1975
- Species: A. atrata

Binomial name
- Achaetocephala atrata Habu, 1975

Genus of beetles

Achaetocephala is a monotypic genus of beetles in the family Carabidae. The sole species is Achaetocephala atrata. It is endemic to Taiwan.

Achaetocephala atrata measure 11.5–13 mm (0.45–0.51 in) in length.
