= Colpoides =

Scientific classification
- Domain: Eukaryota
- Kingdom: Animalia
- Phylum: Arthropoda
- Class: Insecta
- Order: Coleoptera
- Suborder: Adephaga
- Family: Carabidae
- Subfamily: Platyninae
- Tribe: Platynini
- Subtribe: Platynina
- Genus: Colpoides; Jedlicka, 1931

Genus of beetles

Colpoides is a genus in the beetle family Carabidae. There are about five described species in Colpoides.

== Species ==
These five species belong to the genus Colpoides:

- Colpoides formosanus Jedlicka, 1940 (Taiwan)
- Colpoides hauseri Jedlicka, 1931 (China)
- Colpoides kulti Jedlicka, 1952 (China)
- Colpoides orousseti Perrault, 1983 (Philippines)
- Colpoides pecirkai Jedlicka, 1931 (China, Indonesia, and Borneo)
