= Bruskespar =

Scientific classification
- Domain: Eukaryota
- Kingdom: Animalia
- Phylum: Arthropoda
- Class: Insecta
- Order: Coleoptera
- Suborder: Adephaga
- Family: Carabidae
- Subfamily: Platyninae
- Tribe: Platynini
- Subtribe: Platynina
- Genus: Bruskespar; Morvan, 1998

Genus of beetles

Bruskespar is a genus in the beetle family Carabidae. There are at least three described species in Bruskespar, found in China.

== Species ==
These three species belong to the genus Bruskespar:

- Bruskespar deuvei Morvan, 1998 (China)
- Bruskespar deuvesianum Morvan, 2007 (China)
- Bruskespar kevnidennek Morvan, 1998 (China)
