= Deliaesianum =

Scientific classification
- Domain: Eukaryota
- Kingdom: Animalia
- Phylum: Arthropoda
- Class: Insecta
- Order: Coleoptera
- Suborder: Adephaga
- Family: Carabidae
- Subfamily: Platyninae
- Tribe: Platynini
- Subtribe: Platynina
- Genus: Deliaesianum; Morvan, 1999

Genus of beetles

Deliaesianum is a genus in the beetle family Carabidae. There are about six described species in Deliaesianum.

== Species ==
These six species belong to the genus Deliaesianum:

- Deliaesianum bengalense (Chaudoir, 1878) (India)
- Deliaesianum damruz (Morvan, 1999) (Nepal)
- Deliaesianum deliae Morvan, 1999 (Nepal)
- Deliaesianum kucerai Morvan, 2007 (India)
- Deliaesianum nepalense Morvan, 1999 (Nepal)
- Deliaesianum queinneci (Deuve, 1986) (Nepal)
