= Onypterygia =

Scientific classification
- Kingdom: Animalia
- Phylum: Arthropoda
- Class: Insecta
- Order: Coleoptera
- Suborder: Adephaga
- Family: Carabidae
- Subfamily: Platyninae
- Tribe: Platynini
- Subtribe: Platynina
- Genus: Onypterygia; Dejean, 1831

Genus of beetles

Onypterygia is a genus of ground beetles in the family Carabidae. There are more than 30 described species in Onypterygia, found in North, Central, and South America, with the exception of Onypterygia tricolor which is found worldwide.

== Species ==
These 34 species belong to the genus Onypterygia:

- Onypterygia aeneipennis Chaudoir, 1878 (Mexico)
- Onypterygia amecameca Whitehead & Ball, 1997 (Mexico)
- Onypterygia angustata Chevrolat, 1835 (Guatemala and Mexico)
- Onypterygia atoyac Whitehead & Ball, 1997 (Mexico)
- Onypterygia batesi Whitehead & Ball, 1997 (Mexico)
- Onypterygia championi Bates, 1882 (Panama)
- Onypterygia chrysura Bates, 1882 (Guatemala)
- Onypterygia crabilli Whitehead & Ball, 1997 (Costa Rica)
- Onypterygia cupricauda Casey, 1920 (Mexico)
- Onypterygia cyanea Chaudoir, 1878 (Mexico)
- Onypterygia donato Ball & Shpeley, 1992 (Costa Rica)
- Onypterygia exeuros Whitehead & Ball, 1997 (Mexico)
- Onypterygia famini Solier, 1835 (Guatemala, Mexico, and Nicaragua)
- Onypterygia fulgens Dejean, 1831 (Costa Rica, Guatemala, Mexico, and Venezuela)
- Onypterygia hoepfneri Dejean, 1831 (Guatemala and Mexico)
- Onypterygia iris Chaudoir, 1863 (Mexico)
- Onypterygia kathleenae Whitehead & Ball, 1997 (Mexico)
- Onypterygia longispinis Bates, 1882 (Guatemala)
- Onypterygia pacifica Whitehead & Ball, 1997 (Mexico)
- Onypterygia pallidipes Chaudoir, 1878 (Mexico)
- Onypterygia perissostigma Whitehead & Ball, 1997 (Mexico)
- Onypterygia polytreta Whitehead & Ball, 1997 (Panama)
- Onypterygia pseudangustata Whitehead & Ball, 1997 (Mexico)
- Onypterygia pusilla Chaudoir, 1878 (Guatemala and Mexico)
- Onypterygia quadrispinosa Bates, 1882 (Guatemala)
- Onypterygia rawlinsi Whitehead & Ball, 1997 (Mexico)
- Onypterygia rubida Bates, 1884 (Mexico)
- Onypterygia sallei Chaudoir, 1863 (Mexico)
- Onypterygia scintillans Whitehead & Ball, 1997 (Costa Rica)
- Onypterygia shpeleyi Whitehead & Ball, 1997 (Mexico)
- Onypterygia stenapteryx Whitehead & Ball, 1997 (Mexico)
- Onypterygia striblingi Whitehead & Ball, 1997 (Mexico)
- Onypterygia tricolor Dejean, 1831 (worldwide)
- Onypterygia wappesi Whitehead & Ball, 1997 (Mexico)
