= Chaetagonum =

Scientific classification
- Kingdom: Animalia
- Phylum: Arthropoda
- Clade: Pancrustacea
- Class: Insecta
- Order: Coleoptera
- Suborder: Adephaga
- Family: Carabidae
- Subfamily: Platyninae
- Tribe: Platynini
- Subtribe: Platynina
- Genus: Chaetagonum; Burgeon, 1933
- Species: C. collarti

Binomial name
- Chaetagonum collarti (Burgeon, 1933)

Genus of insects

Chaetagonum collarti is a species of beetle in the family Carabidae, the only species in the genus Chaetagonum.
