= Enoicus =

Scientific classification
- Kingdom: Animalia
- Phylum: Arthropoda
- Class: Insecta
- Order: Coleoptera
- Suborder: Adephaga
- Family: Carabidae
- Subfamily: Platyninae
- Tribe: Platynini
- Subtribe: Enoicina
- Genus: Enoicus; Péringuey, 1896
- Species: E. fallax

Binomial name
- Enoicus fallax Péringuey, 1896

Genus of beetles

Enoicus fallax is a species of beetle in the family Carabidae, the only species in the genus Enoicus.
