= Dicranoncus =

Scientific classification
- Domain: Eukaryota
- Kingdom: Animalia
- Phylum: Arthropoda
- Class: Insecta
- Order: Coleoptera
- Suborder: Adephaga
- Family: Carabidae
- Subfamily: Platyninae
- Tribe: Platynini
- Subtribe: Platynina
- Genus: Dicranoncus de Chaudoir, 1850

Genus of beetles

Dicranoncus is a genus of beetles in the family Carabidae, containing the following species:

- Dicranoncus femoralis Chaudoir, 1850
- Dicranoncus philippinensis Jedlicka, 1935
- Dicranoncus pocillator Bates, 1892
- Dicranoncus queenslandicus (Sloane, 1903)
