= Plaumannium =

Scientific classification
- Domain: Eukaryota
- Kingdom: Animalia
- Phylum: Arthropoda
- Class: Insecta
- Order: Coleoptera
- Suborder: Adephaga
- Family: Carabidae
- Subfamily: Platyninae
- Tribe: Platynini
- Subtribe: Platynina
- Genus: Plaumannium; Liebke, 1939
- Species: P. denticolle

Binomial name
- Plaumannium denticolle Liebke, 1939

Genus of beetles

Plaumannium is a genus of ground beetles in the family Carabidae. This genus has a single species, Plaumannium denticolle. It is found in Argentina and Brazil.
