= Prophenorites =

Scientific classification
- Kingdom: Animalia
- Phylum: Arthropoda
- Class: Insecta
- Order: Coleoptera
- Suborder: Adephaga
- Family: Carabidae
- Subfamily: Platyninae
- Tribe: Platynini
- Subtribe: Platynina
- Genus: Prophenorites; Basilewsky, 1985
- Species: P. marojejyanus

Binomial name
- Prophenorites marojejyanus Basilewsky, 1985

Genus of beetles

Prophenorites is a genus of ground beetles in the family Carabidae. This genus has a single species, Prophenorites marojejyanus, which is found in Madagascar.
