= Vulcanophilus =

Scientific classification
- Kingdom: Animalia
- Phylum: Arthropoda
- Clade: Pancrustacea
- Class: Insecta
- Order: Coleoptera
- Suborder: Adephaga
- Family: Carabidae
- Subfamily: Platyninae
- Tribe: Platynini
- Subtribe: Platynina
- Genus: Vulcanophilus; Heller, 1898
- Species: V. calathoides

Binomial name
- Vulcanophilus calathoides Heller, 1898

Genus of beetles

Vulcanophilus is a genus of ground beetles in the family Carabidae. This genus has a single species, Vulcanophilus calathoides. It is found in Indonesia.
