= Trogloagonum =

Scientific classification
- Domain: Eukaryota
- Kingdom: Animalia
- Phylum: Arthropoda
- Class: Insecta
- Order: Coleoptera
- Suborder: Adephaga
- Family: Carabidae
- Subfamily: Platyninae
- Tribe: Platynini
- Subtribe: Platynina
- Genus: Trogloagonum; Casale, 1982
- Species: T. novaehiberniae

Binomial name
- Trogloagonum novaehiberniae Casale, 1982

Genus of beetles

Trogloagonum is a genus of ground beetles in the family Carabidae. This genus has a single species, Trogloagonum novaehiberniae. It is found on New Guinea.
