= Idiastes =

Scientific classification
- Domain: Eukaryota
- Kingdom: Animalia
- Phylum: Arthropoda
- Class: Insecta
- Order: Coleoptera
- Suborder: Adephaga
- Family: Carabidae
- Subfamily: Platyninae
- Tribe: Platynini
- Subtribe: Platynina
- Genus: Idiastes; Andrewes, 1931

Genus of beetles

Idiastes is a genus of ground beetles in the family Carabidae. There are at least two described species in Idiastes, found in Borneo and Indonesia.

== Species ==
These two species belong to the genus Idiastes:

- Idiastes alaticollis Andrewes, 1931
- Idiastes costatus Andrewes, 1931
