= Pawgammm =

Scientific classification
- Domain: Eukaryota
- Kingdom: Animalia
- Phylum: Arthropoda
- Class: Insecta
- Order: Coleoptera
- Suborder: Adephaga
- Family: Carabidae
- Subfamily: Platyninae
- Tribe: Platynini
- Subtribe: Platynina
- Genus: Pawgammm; Morvan, 1999
- Species: P. rougemonti

Binomial name
- Pawgammm rougemonti Morvan, 1999

Genus of beetles

Pawgammm is a genus of ground beetles in the family Carabidae. This genus has a single species, Pawgammm rougemonti.
