= Dirotus =

Scientific classification
- Domain: Eukaryota
- Kingdom: Animalia
- Phylum: Arthropoda
- Class: Insecta
- Order: Coleoptera
- Suborder: Adephaga
- Family: Carabidae
- Subfamily: Platyninae
- Tribe: Platynini
- Subtribe: Platynina
- Genus: Dirotus; W.S.MacLeay, 1825

Genus of beetles

Dirotus is a genus of beetles in the family Carabidae, containing the following species:

- Dirotus extensicollis (Bates, 1892)
- Dirotus feae (Bates, 1889)
- Dirotus reflexus Andrewes, 1929
- Dirotus sikkimensis Jedlicka, 1955
- Dirotus subiridescens (W.S. MacLeay, 1825)
