= Idiocolpodes =

Scientific classification
- Domain: Eukaryota
- Kingdom: Animalia
- Phylum: Arthropoda
- Class: Insecta
- Order: Coleoptera
- Suborder: Adephaga
- Family: Carabidae
- Subfamily: Platyninae
- Tribe: Platynini
- Subtribe: Platynina
- Genus: Idiocolpodes; Basilewsky, 1985
- Species: I. tsaratanensis

Binomial name
- Idiocolpodes tsaratanensis Basilewsky, 1985

Genus of beetles

Idiocolpodes is a genus of ground beetles in the family Carabidae. This genus has a single species, Idiocolpodes tsaratanensis. It is found in Madagascar.
