= Callidagonum =

Scientific classification
- Domain: Eukaryota
- Kingdom: Animalia
- Phylum: Arthropoda
- Class: Insecta
- Order: Coleoptera
- Suborder: Adephaga
- Family: Carabidae
- Subfamily: Platyninae
- Tribe: Platynini
- Subtribe: Platynina
- Genus: Callidagonum; Lorenz, 1998
- Species: C. pallidum

Binomial name
- Callidagonum pallidum (Jedlicka, 1955)

Genus of beetles

Callidagonum pallidum is a species of beetle in the family Carabidae, the only species in the genus Callidagonum.
