= Negreum =

Scientific classification
- Kingdom: Animalia
- Phylum: Arthropoda
- Class: Insecta
- Order: Coleoptera
- Suborder: Adephaga
- Family: Carabidae
- Subfamily: Platyninae
- Tribe: Platynini
- Subtribe: Platynina
- Genus: Negreum; Habu, 1958

Genus of beetles

Negreum is a genus of ground beetles in the family Carabidae. There are about 15 described species in Negreum, found in eastern Asia.

== Species ==
These 15 species belong to the genus Negreum:

- Negreum amagisanum (Morita, 1994) (Japan)
- Negreum asakoae (Morita, 1994) (Japan)
- Negreum bentonis (Bates, 1883) (Japan)
- Negreum bicolore Morvan, 2006 (China)
- Negreum ehikoense (Habu, 1954) (Japan)
- Negreum kulti (Jedlicka, 1940) (Taiwan)
- Negreum lianzhouense Morvan & Tian, 2001 (China)
- Negreum morvani Lassalle, 1997 (China)
- Negreum mutator (Bates, 1883) (Japan)
- Negreum nanlingense Morvan & Tian, 2001 (China)
- Negreum peliotes (Habu, 1974) (Japan)
- Negreum qiongxiense Morvan & Tian, 2001 (China)
- Negreum rougemonti Morvan, 1998 (Thailand)
- Negreum wangmini Morvan & Tian, 2001 (China)
- Negreum yasuii (Habu, 1974) (Japan)
