= Promecoptera =

Scientific classification
- Kingdom: Animalia
- Phylum: Arthropoda
- Class: Insecta
- Order: Coleoptera
- Suborder: Adephaga
- Family: Carabidae
- Subfamily: Platyninae
- Tribe: Platynini
- Subtribe: Platynina
- Genus: Promecoptera; Dejean, 1831
- Species: P. marginalis

Binomial name
- Promecoptera marginalis (Wiedemann, 1823)

Genus of beetles

Promecoptera is a genus of ground beetles in the family Carabidae. This genus has a single species, Promecoptera marginalis. It is found in India.
