= Oxygonium =

Scientific classification
- Domain: Eukaryota
- Kingdom: Animalia
- Phylum: Arthropoda
- Class: Insecta
- Order: Coleoptera
- Suborder: Adephaga
- Family: Carabidae
- Subfamily: Platyninae
- Tribe: Platynini
- Subtribe: Platynina
- Genus: Oxygonium; Basilewsky, 1951

Genus of beetles

Oxygonium is a genus of ground beetles in the family Carabidae. There are at least two described species in Oxygonium.

== Species ==
These two species belong to the genus Oxygonium:

- Oxygonium acutangulum Basilewsky, 1951 (Guinea)
- Oxygonium striatopunctatum Lecordier, 1966 (Sierra Leone)
