= Nipponagonum =

Scientific classification
- Kingdom: Animalia
- Phylum: Arthropoda
- Class: Insecta
- Order: Coleoptera
- Suborder: Adephaga
- Family: Carabidae
- Subfamily: Platyninae
- Tribe: Platynini
- Subtribe: Platynina
- Genus: Nipponagonum; Habu, 1978

Genus of beetles

Nipponagonum is a genus of ground beetles in the family Carabidae. There are about six described species in Nipponagonum, found in eastern Asia.

== Species ==
These six species belong to the genus Nipponagonum:

- Nipponagonum amphinomus (Bates, 1883) (Japan)
- Nipponagonum askellek (Morvan, 1998) (China)
- Nipponagonum hakonum (Harold, 1878) (Japan)
- Nipponagonum meridies (Habu, 1975) (China, Japan, and Taiwan)
- Nipponagonum minamikawai (Habu, 1959) (Japan)
- Nipponagonum nepalense Morvan, 1998 (Nepal)
