= Notocolpodes =

Scientific classification
- Domain: Eukaryota
- Kingdom: Animalia
- Phylum: Arthropoda
- Class: Insecta
- Order: Coleoptera
- Suborder: Adephaga
- Family: Carabidae
- Subfamily: Platyninae
- Tribe: Platynini
- Subtribe: Platynina
- Genus: Notocolpodes; Basilewsky, 1985

Genus of beetles

Notocolpodes is a genus of ground beetles in the family Carabidae. There are more than 30 described species in Notocolpodes, found in Madagascar.

== Species ==
These 33 species belong to the genus Notocolpodes:

- Notocolpodes aeneolus (Jeannel, 1948)
- Notocolpodes ambatovositrae Basilewsky, 1985
- Notocolpodes ankaratrae Basilewsky, 1985
- Notocolpodes commistus Basilewsky, 1985
- Notocolpodes cribellatus Basilewsky, 1985
- Notocolpodes euleptus (Alluaud, 1909)
- Notocolpodes gallienii (Alluaud, 1909)
- Notocolpodes hylonomus (Alluaud, 1935)
- Notocolpodes jeanneli (Basilewsky, 1970)
- Notocolpodes lampros Basilewsky, 1985
- Notocolpodes lapidicola Basilewsky, 1985
- Notocolpodes lautus (Basilewsky, 1970)
- Notocolpodes lenis (Jeannel, 1955)
- Notocolpodes mananarae Basilewsky, 1985
- Notocolpodes marojejyanus Basilewsky, 1985
- Notocolpodes metallicus Basilewsky, 1985
- Notocolpodes micracis (Jeannel, 1948)
- Notocolpodes midongyanus Basilewsky, 1985
- Notocolpodes morpho (Jeannel, 1948)
- Notocolpodes nigrita (Jeannel, 1955)
- Notocolpodes obtusidens (Alluaud, 1897)
- Notocolpodes olsoufieffi (Alluaud, 1935)
- Notocolpodes onivensis (Alluaud, 1935)
- Notocolpodes ovalipennis (Jeannel, 1948)
- Notocolpodes perturbatus Basilewsky, 1985
- Notocolpodes punctatostriatus (Basilewsky, 1970)
- Notocolpodes rufobrunneus (Basilewsky, 1970)
- Notocolpodes rugicollis (Jeannel, 1948)
- Notocolpodes sericeus (Jeannel, 1948)
- Notocolpodes sogai (Basilewsky, 1970)
- Notocolpodes suavis (Alluaud, 1899)
- Notocolpodes subpolitus (Alluaud, 1932)
- Notocolpodes vicinus Basilewsky, 1985
