= Tarsagonum =

Scientific classification
- Domain: Eukaryota
- Kingdom: Animalia
- Phylum: Arthropoda
- Class: Insecta
- Order: Coleoptera
- Suborder: Adephaga
- Family: Carabidae
- Subfamily: Platyninae
- Tribe: Platynini
- Subtribe: Platynina
- Genus: Tarsagonum; Darlington, 1952

Subgenera
- Louwerensium Fedorenko, 2020; Tarsagonum Darlington, 1952

Genus of beetles

Tarsagonum is a genus of ground beetles in the family Carabidae. There are at least four described species in Tarsagonum.

== Species ==
These four species belong to the genus Tarsagonum:

- Tarsagonum breve Fedorenko, 2020 (Laos)
- Tarsagonum indicum Fedorenko, 2020 (India)
- Tarsagonum kaszabi Louwerens, 1966 (Borneo and Indonesia)
- Tarsagonum latipes Darlington, 1952 (New Guinea)
