= Lucicolpodes =

Scientific classification
- Domain: Eukaryota
- Kingdom: Animalia
- Phylum: Arthropoda
- Class: Insecta
- Order: Coleoptera
- Suborder: Adephaga
- Family: Carabidae
- Subfamily: Platyninae
- Tribe: Platynini
- Subtribe: Platynina
- Genus: Lucicolpodes; J.Schmidt, 2000

Subgenera
- Lucicolpodes J.Schmidt, 2000; Vivacolpodes J.Schmidt, 2009

Genus of beetles

Lucicolpodes is a genus of ground beetles in the family Carabidae. There are at least 20 described species in Lucicolpodes, found in southern and eastern Asia.

== Species ==
These 20 species belong to the genus Lucicolpodes:

- Lucicolpodes deuvei Morvan, 2010 (Nepal)
- Lucicolpodes eberti (Jedlicka, 1965) (India and Nepal)
- Lucicolpodes gingko (J.Schmidt, 2000) (China)
- Lucicolpodes kira J.Schmidt, 2009 (Nepal)
- Lucicolpodes lotos (J.Schmidt, 2000) (Myanmar)
- Lucicolpodes lucens (Andrewes, 1947) (Myanmar)
- Lucicolpodes macropus (Andrewes, 1947) (Myanmar)
- Lucicolpodes mandarin (J.Schmidt, 2000) (China)
- Lucicolpodes obsoletus (Louwerens, 1953) (India)
- Lucicolpodes orchis (J.Schmidt, 2000) (China and Myanmar)
- Lucicolpodes panda (J.Schmidt, 2000) (China)
- Lucicolpodes pavo (J.Schmidt, 2000) (Myanmar)
- Lucicolpodes raja (J.Schmidt, 2000) (Nepal)
- Lucicolpodes rani J.Schmidt, 2009 (Nepal)
- Lucicolpodes rhododendron (J.Schmidt, 2000) (China)
- Lucicolpodes sciakyi J.Schmidt, 2009 (Vietnam)
- Lucicolpodes tragopan (J.Schmidt, 2000) (Myanmar)
- Lucicolpodes utheinaungi J.Schmidt, 2009 (Myanmar)
- Lucicolpodes vivax (Andrewes, 1947) (China and Myanmar)
- Lucicolpodes wrasei J.Schmidt, 2009 (Myanmar)
