= Onycholabis =

Scientific classification
- Domain: Eukaryota
- Kingdom: Animalia
- Phylum: Arthropoda
- Class: Insecta
- Order: Coleoptera
- Suborder: Adephaga
- Family: Carabidae
- Subfamily: Platyninae
- Tribe: Platynini
- Subtribe: Platynina
- Genus: Onycholabis; Bates, 1873

Genus of beetles

Onycholabis is a genus of ground beetles in the family Carabidae. There are about seven described species in Onycholabis.

== Species ==
These seven species belong to the genus Onycholabis:

- Onycholabis acutangulus Andrewes, 1923 (China and India)
- Onycholabis arrowi Jedlicka, 1935 (Philippines)
- Onycholabis melitopus Bates, 1892 (worldwide)
- Onycholabis nakanei Kasahara, 1986 (Japan)
- Onycholabis pendulangulus Liang & Imura, 2003 (China, Laos, and Vietnam)
- Onycholabis sinensis Bates, 1873 (China, South Korea, Taiwan, Vietnam, and temperate Asia)
- Onycholabis stenothorax Liang & Kavanaugh, 2005 (China)
