= Paraliagonum =

Scientific classification
- Domain: Eukaryota
- Kingdom: Animalia
- Phylum: Arthropoda
- Class: Insecta
- Order: Coleoptera
- Suborder: Adephaga
- Family: Carabidae
- Subfamily: Platyninae
- Tribe: Platynini
- Subtribe: Platynina
- Genus: Paraliagonum; Basilewsky, 1957
- Species: P. longipes

Binomial name
- Paraliagonum longipes Basilewsky, 1957

Genus of beetles

Paraliagonum is a genus of ground beetles in the family Carabidae. This genus has a single species, Paraliagonum longipes. It is found in Somalia.
