= Hannaphota =

Scientific classification
- Domain: Eukaryota
- Kingdom: Animalia
- Phylum: Arthropoda
- Class: Insecta
- Order: Coleoptera
- Suborder: Adephaga
- Family: Carabidae
- Subfamily: Platyninae
- Tribe: Platynini
- Subtribe: Platynina
- Genus: Hannaphota; Landin, 1955
- Species: H. distincta

Binomial name
- Hannaphota distincta Landin, 1955

Genus of beetles

Hannaphota distincta is a species of beetle in the family Carabidae, the only species in the genus Hannaphota.
