= Bryanites (beetle) =

Scientific classification
- Domain: Eukaryota
- Kingdom: Animalia
- Phylum: Arthropoda
- Class: Insecta
- Order: Coleoptera
- Suborder: Adephaga
- Family: Carabidae
- Subfamily: Platyninae
- Tribe: Platynini
- Subtribe: Platynina
- Genus: Bryanites; Valentine, 1987

Genus of beetles

Bryanites is a genus of in the beetle family Carabidae. There are at least three described species in Bryanites.

== Species ==
These three species belong to the genus Bryanites:

- Bryanites barri Valentine, 1987
- Bryanites graeffii Liebherr, 2017 (Samoa)
- Bryanites samoaensis Valentine, 1987 (Samoa)
