= Glyptolenoides =

Scientific classification
- Domain: Eukaryota
- Kingdom: Animalia
- Phylum: Arthropoda
- Class: Insecta
- Order: Coleoptera
- Suborder: Adephaga
- Family: Carabidae
- Subfamily: Platyninae
- Tribe: Platynini
- Subtribe: Platynina
- Genus: Glyptolenoides; Perrault, 1991

Subgenera
- Cuevadytes Deuve, 2019; Glyptolenoides Perrault, 1991

Genus of beetles

Glyptolenoides is a genus in the beetle family Carabidae. There are about 11 described species in Glyptolenoides.

== Species ==
These 11 species belong to the genus Glyptolenoides:

- Glyptolenoides azureipennis (Chaudoir, 1859) (Colombia and Brazil)
- Glyptolenoides azureus (Chaudoir, 1859) (Bolivia, Colombia, Venezuela, and Ecuador)
- Glyptolenoides balli Moret, 2005 (Ecuador)
- Glyptolenoides cyclothorax (Chaudoir, 1879) (Colombia, Ecuador, and Peru)
- Glyptolenoides elegantulus (Chaudoir, 1878) (Colombia)
- Glyptolenoides germaini Perrault, 1991 (Bolivia)
- Glyptolenoides lipsae Deuve, 2019 (Peru)
- Glyptolenoides purpuripennis (Chaudoir, 1879) (Mexico)
- Glyptolenoides siemeradskii Perrault, 1991 (Ecuador)
- Glyptolenoides sulcipennis (Chaudoir, 1879) (Colombia)
- Glyptolenoides sulcitarsis (Chaudoir, 1878) (Colombia)
