= Nebriagonum =

Scientific classification
- Domain: Eukaryota
- Kingdom: Animalia
- Phylum: Arthropoda
- Class: Insecta
- Order: Coleoptera
- Suborder: Adephaga
- Family: Carabidae
- Subfamily: Platyninae
- Tribe: Platynini
- Subtribe: Platynina
- Genus: Nebriagonum; Darlington, 1952

Genus of beetles

Nebriagonum is a genus of ground beetles in the family Carabidae. There are about 11 described species in Nebriagonum, found in Indonesia and Papua New Guinea.

== Species ==
These 11 species belong to the genus Nebriagonum:

- Nebriagonum arboreum Darlington, 1952
- Nebriagonum basipunctum Baehr, 2012
- Nebriagonum bipunctatum Baehr, 2012
- Nebriagonum cephalum Darlington, 1952
- Nebriagonum foedum Darlington, 1971
- Nebriagonum percephalum Darlington, 1952
- Nebriagonum persetosum Baehr, 2012
- Nebriagonum subcephalum Darlington, 1952
- Nebriagonum transitior Darlington, 1952
- Nebriagonum transitum Darlington, 1952
- Nebriagonum unipunctum Baehr, 2008
