= Platyagonum =

Scientific classification
- Kingdom: Animalia
- Phylum: Arthropoda
- Class: Insecta
- Order: Coleoptera
- Suborder: Adephaga
- Family: Carabidae
- Subfamily: Platyninae
- Tribe: Platynini
- Subtribe: Platynina
- Genus: Platyagonum; Habu, 1978

Genus of beetles

Platyagonum is a genus of ground beetles in the family Carabidae. There are at least two described species in Platyagonum, found in Japan.

== Species ==
These two species belong to the genus Platyagonum:

- Platyagonum esakii (Habu, 1954)
- Platyagonum pseudamphinomus (Habu, 1974)
