= Collagonum =

Scientific classification
- Domain: Eukaryota
- Kingdom: Animalia
- Phylum: Arthropoda
- Class: Insecta
- Order: Coleoptera
- Suborder: Adephaga
- Family: Carabidae
- Subfamily: Platyninae
- Tribe: Platynini
- Subtribe: Platynina
- Genus: Collagonum; Baehr, 1995

Subgenera
- Collagonum Baehr, 1995; Paracollagonum Baehr, 2001; Procollagonum Baehr, 2001

Genus of beetles

Collagonum is a genus in the beetle family Carabidae. There are about 11 described species in Collagonum, found in Indonesia and New Guinea.

== Species ==
These 11 species belong to the genus Collagonum:

- Collagonum convexum Baehr, 1995 (Indonesia and New Guinea)
- Collagonum distortum (Darlington, 1971) (New Guinea)
- Collagonum hornabrooki (Darlington, 1971) (New Guinea)
- Collagonum laticolle (Baehr, 1992) (Indonesia and New Guinea)
- Collagonum limum (Darlington, 1952) (New Guinea)
- Collagonum longipenne Baehr, 2001 (New Guinea)
- Collagonum ophthalmicum (Baehr, 1992) (Indonesia and New Guinea)
- Collagonum riedeli Baehr, 1995 (Indonesia and New Guinea)
- Collagonum robustum Baehr, 1995 (Indonesia and New Guinea)
- Collagonum thoracicum Baehr, 2001 (New Guinea)
- Collagonum violaceum Baehr, 1995 (New Guinea)
