= Speokokosia =

Scientific classification
- Kingdom: Animalia
- Phylum: Arthropoda
- Class: Insecta
- Order: Coleoptera
- Suborder: Adephaga
- Family: Carabidae
- Subfamily: Platyninae
- Tribe: Platynini
- Subtribe: Platynina
- Genus: Speokokosia; Alluaud, 1932
- Species: S. corneti

Binomial name
- Speokokosia corneti Alluaud, 1932

Genus of beetles

Speokokosia is a genus of ground beetles in the family Carabidae. This genus has a single species, Speokokosia corneti. It is found in the Democratic Republic of the Congo.
