= Ischnagonum =

Scientific classification
- Domain: Eukaryota
- Kingdom: Animalia
- Phylum: Arthropoda
- Class: Insecta
- Order: Coleoptera
- Suborder: Adephaga
- Family: Carabidae
- Subfamily: Platyninae
- Tribe: Platynini
- Subtribe: Platynina
- Genus: Ischnagonum; Kasahara & Satô, 1997
- Species: I. carinigerum

Binomial name
- Ischnagonum carinigerum Kasahara & Satô, 1997

Genus of beetles

Ischnagonum is a genus of ground beetles in the family Carabidae. This genus has a single species, Ischnagonum carinigerum. It is found in Japan.
