= Austroglyptolenus =

Scientific classification
- Domain: Eukaryota
- Kingdom: Animalia
- Phylum: Arthropoda
- Class: Insecta
- Order: Coleoptera
- Suborder: Adephaga
- Family: Carabidae
- Subfamily: Platyninae
- Tribe: Platynini
- Subtribe: Platynina
- Genus: Austroglyptolenus; Roig-Juñent, 2003

Genus of beetles

Austroglyptolenus is a genus of beetles in the family Carabidae, containing the following species:

- Austroglyptolenus mendozensis Roig-Junient, 2003
- Austroglyptolenus precordillerae Roig-Junient, 2003
