= Neobatenus =

Scientific classification
- Domain: Eukaryota
- Kingdom: Animalia
- Phylum: Arthropoda
- Class: Insecta
- Order: Coleoptera
- Suborder: Adephaga
- Family: Carabidae
- Subfamily: Platyninae
- Tribe: Platynini
- Subtribe: Platynina
- Genus: Neobatenus; Jeannel, 1948

Genus of beetles

Neobatenus is a genus of ground beetles in the family Carabidae. There are about 17 described species in Neobatenus, found in Africa.

== Species ==
These 17 species belong to the genus Neobatenus:

- Neobatenus deprimatus Basilewsky, 1988 (South Africa)
- Neobatenus elgonensis (Burgeon, 1935) (Kenya and Uganda)
- Neobatenus fallaciosus (Péringuey, 1898) (Mozambique, South Africa, and Zimbabwe)
- Neobatenus halophilus Basilewsky, 1962 (Tanzania)
- Neobatenus harroyi Basilewsky, 1956 (Burundi and Democratic Republic of the Congo)
- Neobatenus harveyi (Basilewsky, 1962) (Tanzania)
- Neobatenus jimmae Basilewsky, 1975 (Ethiopia)
- Neobatenus kilimanus (Alluaud, 1917) (Tanzania)
- Neobatenus laetulus (Péringuey, 1898) (South Africa and Zimbabwe)
- Neobatenus malawiensis Basilewsky, 1988 (Malawi)
- Neobatenus pridhami (Basilewsky, 1962) (Tanzania)
- Neobatenus pseudophanes (Alluaud, 1935) (Madagascar)
- Neobatenus ruandanus (Burgeon, 1935) (Democratic Republic of the Congo and Rwanda)
- Neobatenus striatitarsis (Péringuey, 1896) (South Africa)
- Neobatenus transvaalensis (Péringuey, 1926) (South Africa and Zimbabwe)
- Neobatenus witteanus (Burgeon, 1935) (Democratic Republic of the Congo, Namibia, Rwanda, and Tanzania)
- Neobatenus zavattarii (Basilewsky, 1953) (Ethiopia)
