= Liagonum =

Scientific classification
- Domain: Eukaryota
- Kingdom: Animalia
- Phylum: Arthropoda
- Class: Insecta
- Order: Coleoptera
- Suborder: Adephaga
- Family: Carabidae
- Subfamily: Platyninae
- Tribe: Platynini
- Subtribe: Platynina
- Genus: Liagonum; Jeannel, 1948

Genus of beetles

Liagonum is a genus of ground beetles in the family Carabidae. There are more than 50 described species in Liagonum, most found in Africa.

== Species ==
These 55 species belong to the genus Liagonum:

- Liagonum aereum (Coquerel, 1866) (Madagascar)
- Liagonum analavelonae Basilewsky, 1985 (Madagascar)
- Liagonum anosyanum Basilewsky, 1985 (Madagascar)
- Liagonum arecarum (Coquerel, 1866) (Reunion)
- Liagonum assimile Jeannel, 1948 (Madagascar)
- Liagonum baleense (Basilewsky, 1975) (Ethiopia)
- Liagonum beckeri Jeannel, 1961 (the Lesser Antilles)
- Liagonum bicolor (Basilewsky, 1956) (Democratic Republic of the Congo, Rwanda, and Uganda)
- Liagonum bintumanum Basilewsky, 1971 (Sierra Leone)
- Liagonum bosmansi Basilewsky, 1985 (Cameroon)
- Liagonum brachypterum Basilewsky, 1985 (Madagascar)
- Liagonum chappuisi (Burgeon, 1935) (Kenya)
- Liagonum chenzemae Basilewsky, 1976 (Tanzania)
- Liagonum coquereli (Alluaud, 1897) (the Comoro Islands and Madagascar)
- Liagonum curvipes Basilewsky, 1985 (Madagascar)
- Liagonum decellei Basilewsky, 1968 (Ivory Coast)
- Liagonum deplanatum Basilewsky, 1985 (Madagascar)
- Liagonum descarpentriesi (Basilewsky, 1967) (Congo (Brazzaville))
- Liagonum florens Basilewsky, 1988 (South Africa)
- Liagonum fulvipes (LaFerté-Sénectère, 1853) (worldwide)
- Liagonum grandidieri (Alluaud, 1897) (Madagascar)
- Liagonum hova (Alluaud, 1897) (Madagascar)
- Liagonum incertum Basilewsky, 1985 (Madagascar)
- Liagonum jeanneli (Alluaud, 1917) (Tanzania)
- Liagonum kiymbiae (Basilewsky, 1960) (Democratic Republic of the Congo)
- Liagonum laticolle Jeannel, 1948 (Madagascar)
- Liagonum lichenyanum Basilewsky, 1988 (Malawi)
- Liagonum mahafalyanum Basilewsky, 1985 (Madagascar)
- Liagonum mandibulare (Basilewsky, 1963) (Guinea and Sierra Leone)
- Liagonum mangindranum Basilewsky, 1985 (Madagascar)
- Liagonum mantasoae Basilewsky, 1985 (Madagascar)
- Liagonum marakwetianum (Burgeon, 1935) (Kenya)
- Liagonum marojejyanum Basilewsky, 1985 (Madagascar)
- Liagonum metrium (Alluaud, 1933) (Mauritius)
- Liagonum monticola (Jeannel, 1951) (Madagascar)
- Liagonum nebrioides Basilewsky, 1985 (Madagascar)
- Liagonum orophilum Basilewsky, 1985 (Madagascar)
- Liagonum pauliani Basilewsky, 1985 (Madagascar)
- Liagonum peyrierasi Basilewsky, 1985 (Madagascar)
- Liagonum ranomandryae Basilewsky, 1985 (Madagascar)
- Liagonum rhetoborum Basilewsky, 1985 (Madagascar)
- Liagonum scordiscum (Basilewsky, 1975) (Ethiopia)
- Liagonum scotti Basilewsky, 1957 (Ethiopia)
- Liagonum sexpunctatum (Dejean, 1831) (Reunion)
- Liagonum simplex (Alluaud, 1897) (Madagascar)
- Liagonum solidum (Alluaud, 1897) (Madagascar)
- Liagonum submimum (Basilewsky, 1963) (Guinea)
- Liagonum subsolanum Jeannel, 1948 (Madagascar)
- Liagonum tsaratananae Basilewsky, 1985 (Madagascar)
- Liagonum ueleanum (Burgeon, 1933) (Democratic Republic of the Congo)
- Liagonum vadoni Basilewsky, 1985 (Madagascar)
- Liagonum vakoanae (Jeannel, 1951) (Madagascar)
- Liagonum vanderijsti (Burgeon, 1933) (worldwide)
- Liagonum vicinum Jeannel, 1951 (Madagascar)
- Liagonum viettei Basilewsky, 1985 (Madagascar)
