= Dinocolpodes =

Scientific classification
- Domain: Eukaryota
- Kingdom: Animalia
- Phylum: Arthropoda
- Class: Insecta
- Order: Coleoptera
- Suborder: Adephaga
- Family: Carabidae
- Subfamily: Platyninae
- Tribe: Platynini
- Subtribe: Platynina
- Genus: Dinocolpodes; J.Schmidt, 2001
- Species: D. emeishanicus

Binomial name
- Dinocolpodes emeishanicus J.Schmidt, 2001

Genus of beetles

Dinocolpodes emeishanicus is a species of beetle in the family Carabidae, the only species in the genus Dinocolpodes.
