= Herculagonum =

Scientific classification
- Domain: Eukaryota
- Kingdom: Animalia
- Phylum: Arthropoda
- Class: Insecta
- Order: Coleoptera
- Suborder: Adephaga
- Family: Carabidae
- Subfamily: Platyninae
- Tribe: Platynini
- Subtribe: Platynina
- Genus: Herculagonum; Baehr, 2002

Genus of beetles

Herculagonum is a genus of ground beetles in the family Carabidae. There are at least three described species in Herculagonum.

== Species ==
These three species belong to the genus Herculagonum:

- Herculagonum anassa (Darlington, 1971) (New Guinea)
- Herculagonum anax (Darlington, 1971) (New Guinea)
- Herculagonum atlas Baehr, 2002 (Papua)
