= Meleagros (beetle) =

Scientific classification
- Domain: Eukaryota
- Kingdom: Animalia
- Phylum: Arthropoda
- Class: Insecta
- Order: Coleoptera
- Suborder: Adephaga
- Family: Carabidae
- Subfamily: Platyninae
- Tribe: Platynini
- Subtribe: Platynina
- Genus: Meleagros; Kirschenhofer, 1999

Genus of beetles

Meleagros is a genus of in the beetle family Carabidae. There are about seven described species in Meleagros, found in Indomalaya.

== Species ==
These seven species belong to the genus Meleagros:

- Meleagros astericollis Fedorenko, 2020 (Vietnam)
- Meleagros burmanensis Morvan, 2004 (Myanmar)
- Meleagros coeruleus Kirschenhofer, 1999 (Malaysia)
- Meleagros pseudosinicola Fedorenko, 2020 (Vietnam)
- Meleagros setulosus Fedorenko, 2020 (Vietnam)
- Meleagros sikkimensis (Andrewes, 1923) (Nepal, Bhutan, India, Myanmar, and Malaysia)
- Meleagros sinicola Morvan, 2006 (China)
