= Stenocnemus =

Scientific classification
- Kingdom: Animalia
- Phylum: Arthropoda
- Clade: Pancrustacea
- Class: Insecta
- Order: Coleoptera
- Suborder: Adephaga
- Family: Carabidae
- Subfamily: Platyninae
- Tribe: Platynini
- Subtribe: Platynina
- Genus: Stenocnemus; Mannerheim, 1837
- Species: S. mannerheimii

Binomial name
- Stenocnemus mannerheimii (Chaudoir, 1859)

Genus of beetles

Stenocnemus is a genus of ground beetles in the family Carabidae. This genus has a single species, Stenocnemus mannerheimii. It is found in Hispaniola.
