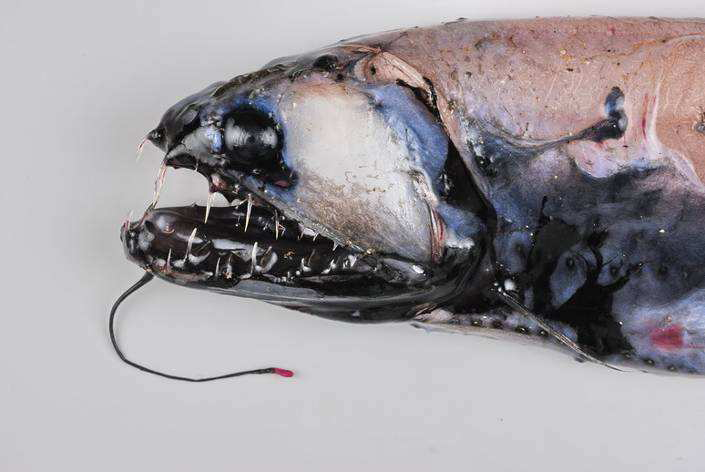
- Astronesthes sp. (2008). The soft skin on this specimen was damaged by the net in which it was collected.

Scientific classification
- Domain: Eukaryota
- Kingdom: Animalia
- Phylum: Chordata
- Class: Actinopterygii
- Order: Stomiiformes
- Family: Stomiidae
- Subfamily: Astronesthinae
- Genus: Astronesthes; J. Richardson, 1845

Species
- See text

= Stareater (fish) =

Stareater Temporal range: ?Late Eocene to present

Genus of fishes

Snaggletooths or stareaters are any of a number of small, deep-sea stomiid fish in the genus Astronesthes. They possess a bioluminescent red chin barbel that the fish use as a lure to attract small prey into striking distance.

The fish have delicate skin, and mouths filled with sharp, needlelike, curved teeth.

== Species ==
There are currently 48 recognized species in this genus:

- Astronesthes atlanticus Parin & Borodulina, 1996
- Astronesthes bilobatus Parin & Borodulina, 1996 (Twinlobe snaggletooth)
- Astronesthes boulengeri Gilchrist, 1902 (Boulenger's snaggletooth)
- Astronesthes caulophorus Regan & Trewavas, 1929
- Astronesthes chrysophekadion (Bleeker, 1849)
- Astronesthes cyaneus (A. B. Brauer, 1902)
- Astronesthes decoratus Parin & Borodulina, 2002
- Astronesthes dupliglandis Parin & Borodulina, 1997
- Astronesthes exsul Parin & Borodulina, 2002 (Exile snaggletooth)
- Astronesthes fedorovi Parin & Borodulina, 1994
- Astronesthes formosana Y. C. Liao, L. S. Chen & K. T. Shao, 2006
- Astronesthes galapagensis Parin, Borodulina & Hulley, 1999
- Astronesthes gemmifer Goode & T. H. Bean, 1896
- Astronesthes gibbsi Borodulina, 1992
- Astronesthes gudrunae Parin & Borodulina, 2002
- Astronesthes haplophos Parin & Borodulina, 2002
- Astronesthes ijimai S. Tanaka (I), 1908 (Ijima's snaggletooth)
- Astronesthes illuminatus Parin, Borodulina & Hulley, 1999
- Astronesthes indicus A. B. Brauer, 1902 (Black snaggletooth)
- Astronesthes indopacificus Parin & Borodulina, 1997 (Indo-Pacific snaggletooth)
- Astronesthes karsteni Parin & Borodulina, 2002
- Astronesthes kreffti Gibbs & McKinney, 1988 (Krefft's snaggletooth)
- Astronesthes lamellosus Goodyear & Gibbs, 1970
- Astronesthes lampara Parin & Borodulina, 1998
- Astronesthes leucopogon Regan & Trewavas, 1929
- Astronesthes lucibucca Parin & Borodulina, 1996
- Astronesthes lucifer C. H. Gilbert, 1905 (Pacific astronesthid fish)
- Astronesthes luetkeni Regan & Trewavas, 1929
- Astronesthes lupina Whitley, 1941 (Little wolf)
- Astronesthes macropogon Goodyear & Gibbs, 1970
- Astronesthes martensii Klunzinger, 1871
- Astronesthes micropogon Goodyear & Gibbs, 1970
- Astronesthes neopogon Regan & Trewavas, 1929
- Astronesthes niger J. Richardson, 1845
- Astronesthes nigroides Gibbs & Aron, 1960
- Astronesthes oligoa Parin & Borodulina, 2002
- Astronesthes psychrolutes (Gibbs & S. H. Weitzman, 1965) (Temperate snaggletooth)
- Astronesthes quasiindicus Parin & Borodulina, 1996
- Astronesthes richardsoni (Poey, 1852) (Richardson's snaggletooth)
- Astronesthes similus A. E. Parr, 1927
- Astronesthes spatulifer Gibbs & McKinney, 1988
- Astronesthes splendidus A. B. Brauer, 1902 (Splendid snaggletooth)
- Astronesthes tanibe Parin & Borodulina, 2001
- Astronesthes tatyanae Parin & Borodulina, 1998
- Astronesthes tchuvasovi Parin & Borodulina, 1996
- Astronesthes trifibulatus Gibbs, Amaoka & Haruka, 1984 (Triplethread snaggletooth)
- Astronesthes zetgibbsi Parin & Borodulina, 1997
- Astronesthes zharovi Parin & Borodulina, 1998

The only potential fossil species of this genus is ?Astronesthes simus Arambourg, 1967 from the Late Eocene or Early Oligocene-aged Pabdeh Formation of Iran. However, its taxonomic assignment to this genus is uncertain. Remains from the Middle Eocene of Georgia previously assigned to this genus are now placed in their own genus, Azemiolestes.

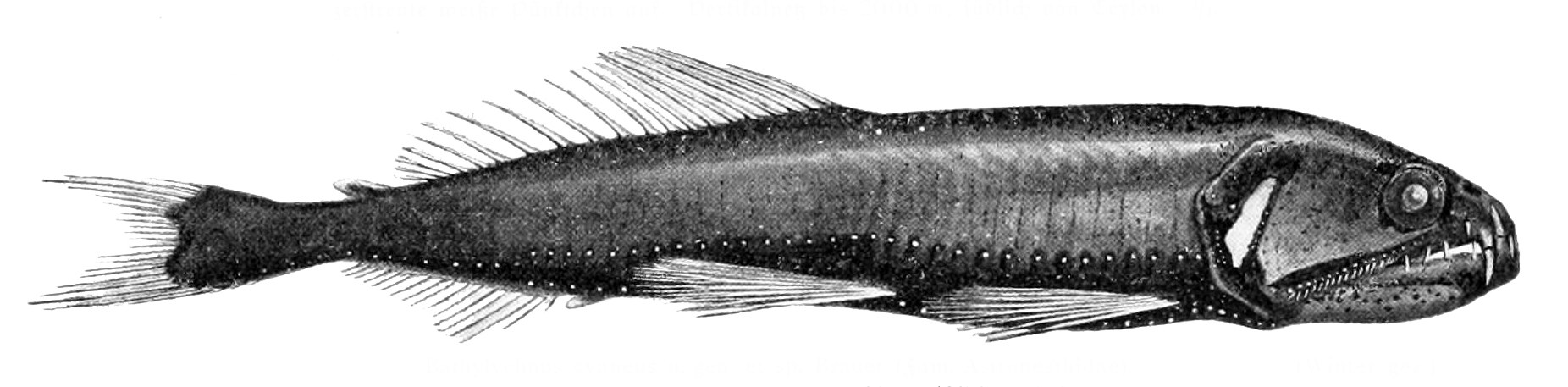
Astronesthes cyaneus

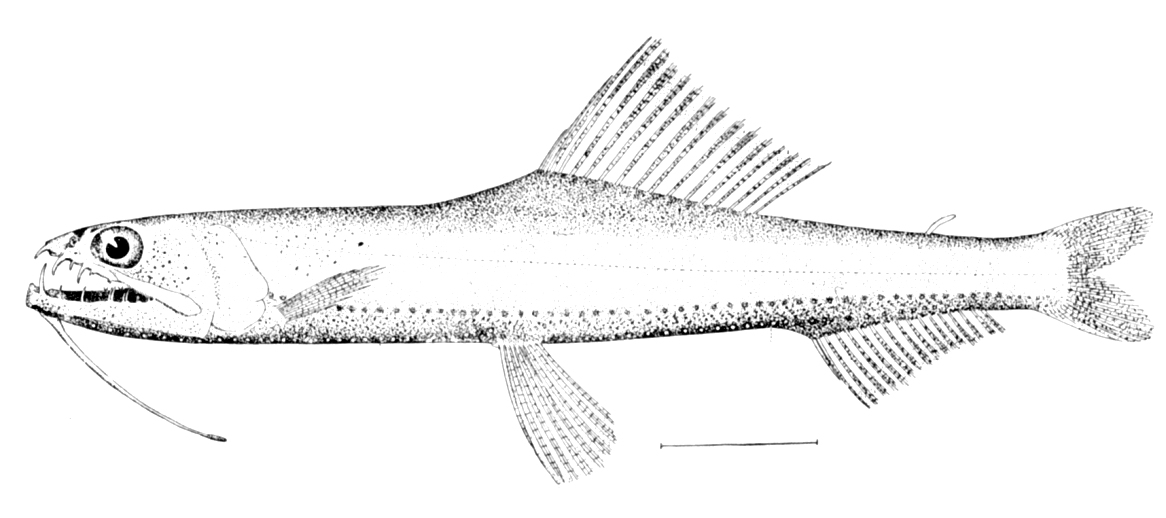
Astronesthes gemmifer

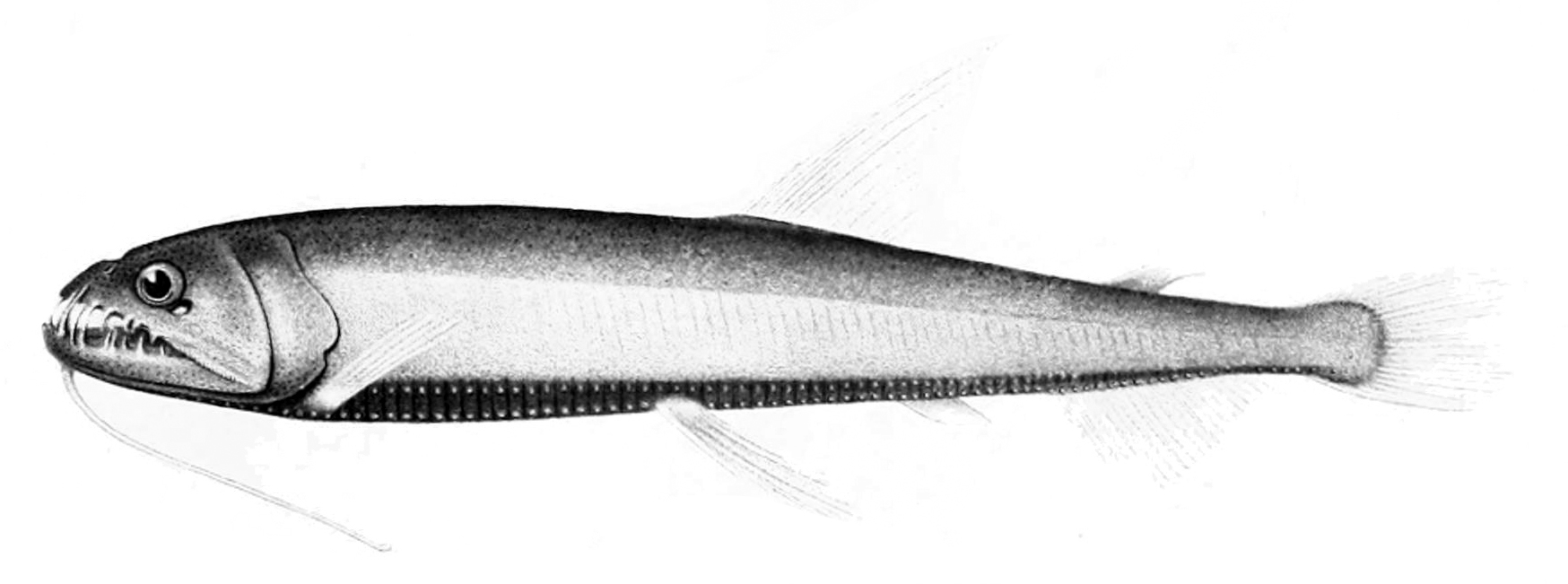
Astronesthes lucifer

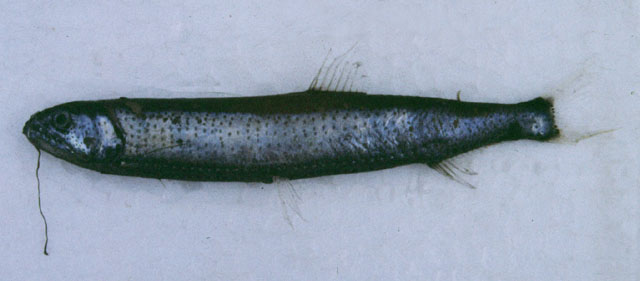
Astronesthes martensii

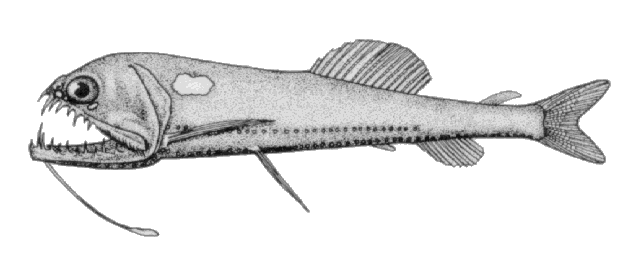
Astronesthes niger

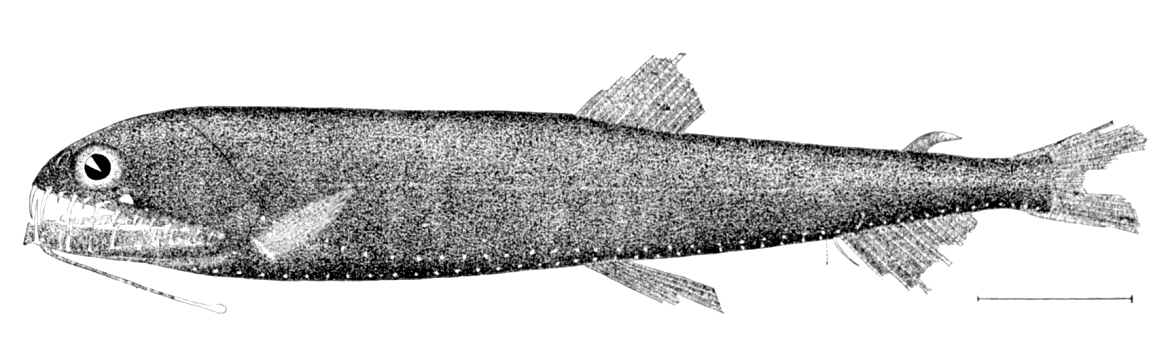
Astronesthes richardsoni

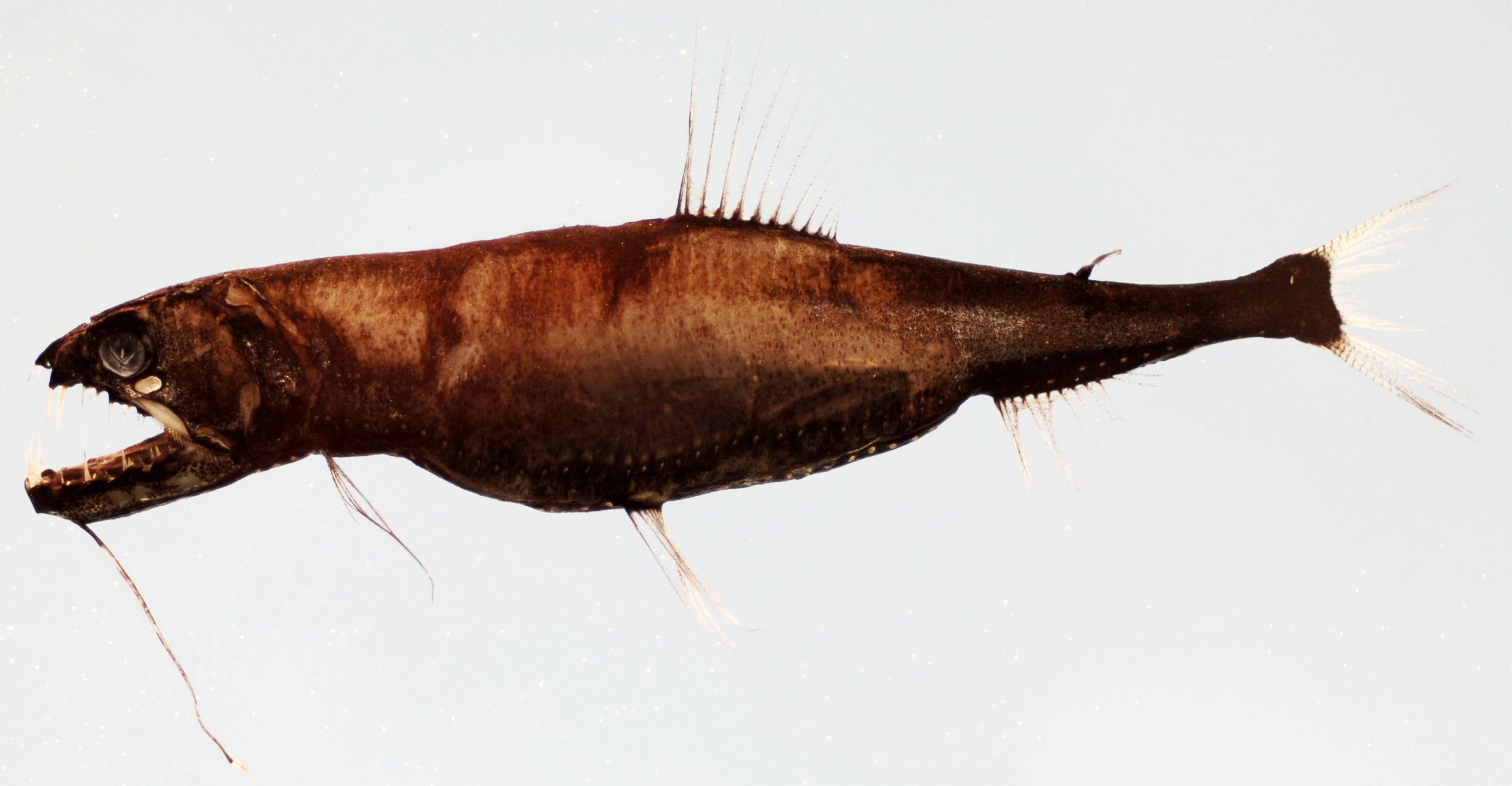
Astronesthes similus

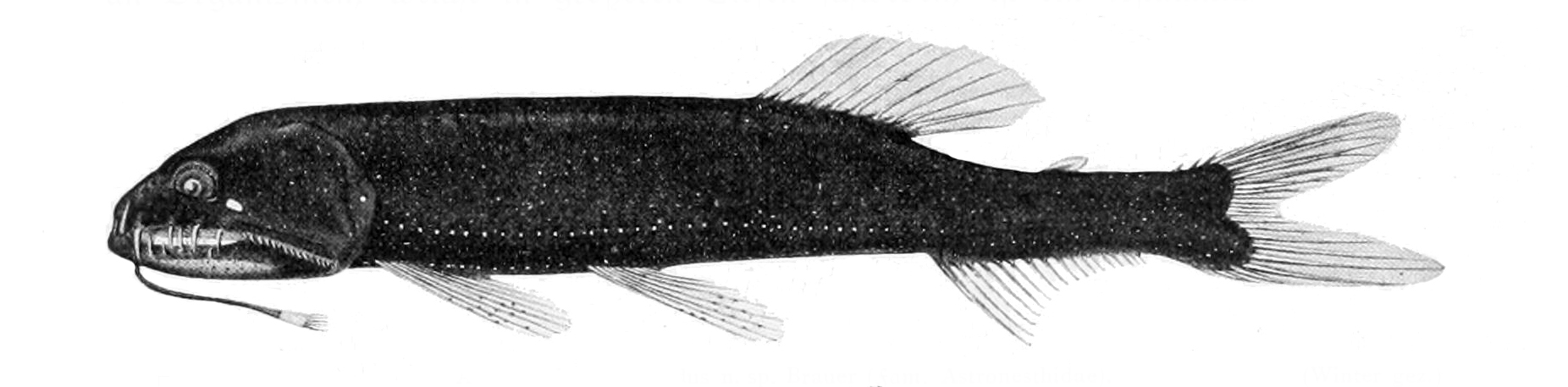
Astronesthes splendida
