= A. fedorovi =

A. fedorovi may refer to:

- Andrewesius fedorovi, a species of beetle in the genus Andrewesius
- Apristurus fedorovi, a species of shark
- Astronesthes fedorovi, a species of fish
