= Astronesthes exsul =

Scientific classification
- Kingdom: Animalia
- Phylum: Chordata
- Class: Actinopterygii
- Order: Stomiiformes
- Family: Stomiidae
- Genus: Astronesthes
- Species: A. exsul

Binomial name
- Astronesthes exsul Parin & Borodulina, 2002

Species of fish

Astronesthes exsul, also known as the exile snaggletooth, is a deep sea fish in the family Stomiidae. It can be found off the northwest coast of Australia.
