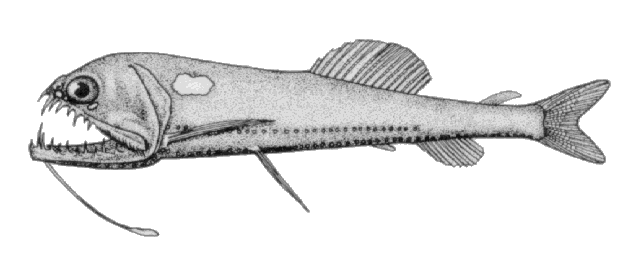

Scientific classification
- Kingdom: Animalia
- Phylum: Chordata
- Class: Actinopterygii
- Order: Stomiiformes
- Family: Stomiidae
- Genus: Astronesthes
- Species: A. niger

Binomial name
- Astronesthes niger J. Richardson, 1845

Synonyms
- Astronesthes nigra Richardson, 1845; Chauliodus fieldii (Valenciennes, 1846); Stomias fieldii Valenciennes, 1846

= Astronesthes niger =

Species of fish

Astronesthes niger, commonly known as snaggletooth, is a species of small, deep sea fish in the family Stomiidae. It occurs in the tropical and subtropical Atlantic Ocean, the Caribbean Sea and the Gulf of Mexico, as well as the Indian Ocean and western Pacific Ocean, at depths to 1,000 m (3,300 ft).

== Description ==
Astronesthes niger is a slender, somewhat elongate, black fish with a large mouth, fang-like teeth, and a long barbel on its chin tipped by a knob. This fish grows to a maximum length of about 16 cm (6.3 in) and can be distinguished from other closely related species by its snout lacking a turned up tip, by the barbel being less than 1.7 times the length of the head, and by the swollen portion on the barbel being one third to one half its length. The dorsal fin has 15 to 17 soft rays and is set slightly behind the pelvic fins. There is a ventral adipose fin in front of the anus, and the anal fin has 12 to 15 soft rays. There are two longitudinal rows of photophores on either flank and there are luminous patches in front of the eye, above the nostrils, above the eye, and a large patch above the pectoral fin.

== Distribution and habitat ==
The species is found in the mesopelagic zone of the tropical and subtropical Atlantic Ocean, the Caribbean Sea and the Gulf of Mexico, between about 40°N and the equator. It is also present in the western Pacific and the Indian Oceans. Although its depth range extends to about 1,000 m (3,300 ft), at night it is most abundant at less than about 100 m (300 ft). Also can be found in Australian waters.

== Ecology ==
Astronesthes niger is a predator and feeds on krill, amphipods and lanternfishes. It appears to only rise to the very top layer of the water column when both the sun and moon are below the horizon, at about the periods of the month when the moon is in its first or third quarter phase; it appears that the fish needs the moon for its vertical migrations but avoids the surface when it is illuminated. Little is known about the reproduction of this fish and the development of its larvae.
