= Astronesthes formosana =

Scientific classification
- Kingdom: Animalia
- Phylum: Chordata
- Class: Actinopterygii
- Order: Stomiiformes
- Family: Stomiidae
- Genus: Astronesthes
- Species: A. formosana

Binomial name
- Astronesthes formosana Liao, Chen & Shao, 2006

Species of fish

Astronesthes formosana is a deep sea fish in the family Stomiidae.
