= Astronesthes bilobatus =

Scientific classification
- Kingdom: Animalia
- Phylum: Chordata
- Class: Actinopterygii
- Order: Stomiiformes
- Family: Stomiidae
- Genus: Astronesthes
- Species: A. bilobatus

Binomial name
- Astronesthes bilobatus Parin & Borodulina, 1996

Species of fish

Astronesthes bilobatus, also known as the twinlobe snaggletooth, is a deep sea fish in the family Stomiidae.
