= Astronesthes caulophorus =

Scientific classification
- Kingdom: Animalia
- Phylum: Chordata
- Class: Actinopterygii
- Order: Stomiiformes
- Family: Stomiidae
- Genus: Astronesthes
- Species: A. caulophorus

Binomial name
- Astronesthes caulophorus Regan & Trewavas, 1929

Species of fish

Astronesthes caulophorus is a deep sea fish in the family Stomiidae.
