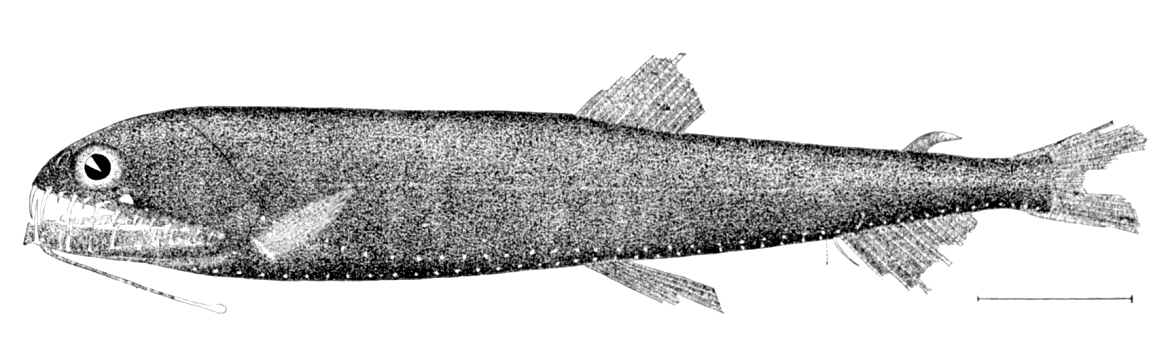

Scientific classification
- Kingdom: Animalia
- Phylum: Chordata
- Class: Actinopterygii
- Order: Stomiiformes
- Family: Stomiidae
- Genus: Astronesthes
- Species: A. richardsoni

Binomial name
- Astronesthes richardsoni Poey, 1852

Synonyms
- Astronesthes filifer Regan & Trewavas, 1929; Astronesthes oculatus Regan & Trewavas, 1929; Astronesthes richardsonii (Poey, 1852); Chauliodus richardsoni Poey, 1852

= Astronesthes richardsoni =

Species of fish

Astronesthes richardsoni, or Richardson's snaggletooth, is a species of small, deep sea fish in the family Stomiidae. It occurs in the tropical western Atlantic Ocean, the Caribbean Sea and the Gulf of Mexico. First described by the Cuban zoologist Felipe Poey in 1852, it was named Chauliodus richardsoni in honour of the Scottish explorer and naturalist John Richardson. It was later transferred to the genus Astronesthes.

== Description ==
Richardson's snaggletooth is a slender, laterally-compressed fish with a short snout, a terminal, horizontal mouth and large fang-like teeth. The teeth on the maxillae are backwards-pointing and comb-like. The long barbel on the chin is ribbon-like and lacks a bulb or swelling at its tip. The dorsal fin has 12 to 14 soft rays and the anal fin has 13 to 18. The origin of the dorsal fin is behind the insertion of the pelvic fins. There is a dorsal adipose fin anterior to the caudal peduncle, and a small ventral adipose fin just anterior to the anus. There are two rows of photophores (luminous spots) on each side of the underside of the fish, numerous other photophores on the head and body and a luminous patch on the edge of the preoperculum; the colour of this fish is black and the maximum standard length is 145 mm (5.7 in).

== Distribution and habitat ==
The species is found in the mesopelagic zone of the tropical western Atlantic, the Caribbean Sea and the eastern Gulf of Mexico. Although its depth range extends to about 1,000 m (3,300 ft), it is most abundant above about 300 m (1,000 ft).

== Ecology ==
As a predator, Richardson's snaggletooth feeds on other fish and on krill.
