= Astronesthes dupliglandis =

Scientific classification
- Kingdom: Animalia
- Phylum: Chordata
- Class: Actinopterygii
- Order: Stomiiformes
- Family: Stomiidae
- Genus: Astronesthes
- Species: A. dupliglandis

Binomial name
- Astronesthes dupliglandis Parin & Borodulina, 1997

Species of fish

Astronesthes dupliglandis is a deep sea fish in the family Stomiidae, that can be found in the Pacific Ocean.
