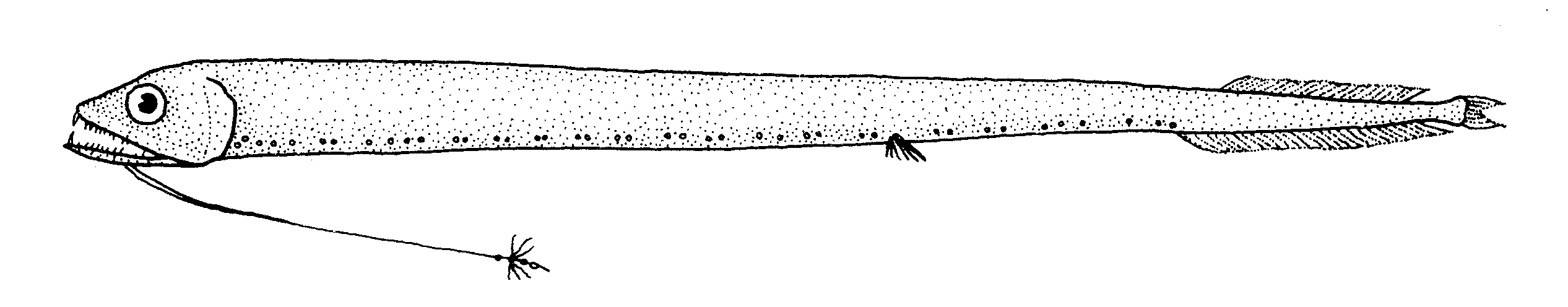
- Eustomias trewavasae
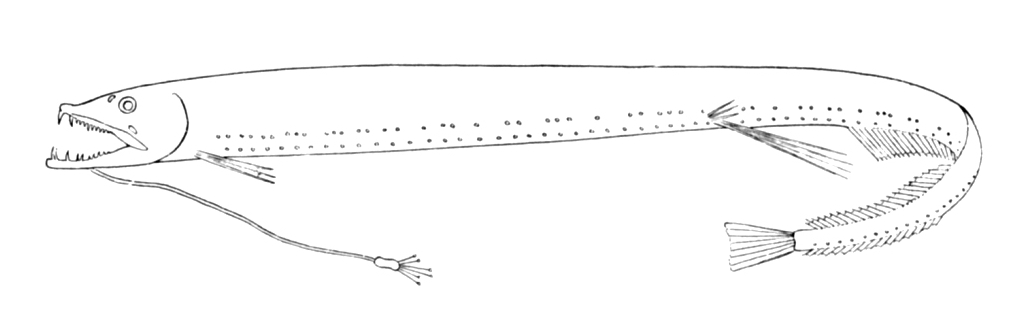
- Eustomias obscurus

Scientific classification
- Kingdom: Animalia
- Phylum: Chordata
- Class: Actinopterygii
- Order: Stomiiformes
- Family: Stomiidae
- Subfamily: Melanostomiinae
- Genus: Eustomias; Vaillant, 1888

Type species
- Eustomias obscurus Vaillant, 1888

Synonyms
- Eustomias Vaillant, 1884; Neostomias Gilchrist, 1906; Pareustomias Bailly, 1930; Achirostomias Regan & Trewavas, 1930; Dinematochirus Regan & Trewavas, 1930; Haploclonus Regan & Trewavas, 1930; Nominostomias Regan & Trewavas, 1930; Rhynchostomias Regan & Trewavas, 1930; Spilostomias Regan & Trewavas, 1930; Triclonostomias Regan & Trewavas, 1930; Urostomias Regan & Trewavas, 1930; Parastomias Roule & Angel, 1931; Biradiostomias Gomon & Gibbs, 1985

= Eustomias =

Genus of fishes

Eustomias is a genus of barbeled dragonfishes native to the oceanic depths of the Indian, Atlantic and Pacific oceans.

== Species ==
There are currently 121 recognized species in this genus:

- Eustomias achirus Parin & Pokhil'skaya, 1974 (Proud dragonfish)
- Eustomias acinosus Regan & Trewavas, 1930
- Eustomias aequatorialis T. A. Clarke, 1998
- Eustomias albibulbus T. A. Clarke, 2001
- Eustomias appositus Gibbs, T. A. Clarke & J. R. Gomon, 1983
- Eustomias arborifer A. E. Parr, 1927
- Eustomias australensis Gibbs, T. A. Clarke & J. R. Gomon, 1983 (Australian dragonfish)
- Eustomias austratlanticus Gibbs, T. A. Clarke & J. R. Gomon, 1983
- Eustomias bertelseni Gibbs, T. A. Clarke & J. R. Gomon, 1983
- Eustomias bibulboides Gibbs, T. A. Clarke & J. R. Gomon, 1983
- Eustomias bibulbosus A. E. Parr, 1927
- Eustomias bifilis Gibbs, 1960 (Twinthread dragonfish)
- Eustomias bigelowi W. W. Welsh, 1923
- Eustomias bimargaritatus Regan & Trewavas, 1930
- Eustomias bimargaritoides Gibbs, T. A. Clarke & J. R. Gomon, 1983
- Eustomias binghami A. E. Parr, 1927
- Eustomias bituberatus Regan & Trewavas, 1930
- Eustomias bituberoides Gibbs, T. A. Clarke & J. R. Gomon, 1983
- Eustomias borealis T. A. Clarke, 2000
- Eustomias braueri Zugmayer, 1911
- Eustomias brevibarbatus A. E. Parr, 1927
- Eustomias bulbiramis T. A. Clarke, 2001
- Eustomias bulbornatus Gibbs, 1960 (Grapevine dragonfish)
- Eustomias cancriensis Gibbs, T. A. Clarke & J. R. Gomon, 1983
- Eustomias cirritus Gibbs, T. A. Clarke & J. R. Gomon, 1983
- Eustomias contiguus J. R. Gomon & Gibbs, 1985
- Eustomias crossotus Gibbs, T. A. Clarke & J. R. Gomon, 1983
- Eustomias crucis Gibbs & Craddock, 1973
- Eustomias cryptobulbus T. A. Clarke, 2001 (Hiddenbulb dragonfish)
- Eustomias curtatus Gibbs, T. A. Clarke & J. R. Gomon, 1983
- Eustomias curtifilis T. A. Clarke, 2000
- Eustomias danae T. A. Clarke, 2001
- Eustomias decoratus Gibbs, 1971
- Eustomias dendriticus Regan & Trewavas, 1930
- Eustomias dendrobium Koeda & Ho, 2019 (Dendrobium dragonfish)
- Eustomias deofamiliaris Gibbs, T. A. Clarke & J. R. Gomon, 1983
- Eustomias digitatus J. R. Gomon & Gibbs, 1985
- Eustomias dinema T. A. Clarke, 1999
- Eustomias dispar J. R. Gomon & Gibbs, 1985
- Eustomias dubius A. E. Parr, 1927
- Eustomias elongatus T. A. Clarke, 2001
- Eustomias enbarbatus W. W. Welsh, 1923 (Barbate dragonfish)
- Eustomias filifer Gilchrist, 1906
- Eustomias fissibarbis Pappenheim, 1912
- Eustomias flagellifer T. A. Clarke, 2001
- Eustomias furcifer Regan & Trewavas, 1930
- Eustomias gibbsi R. K. Johnson & Rosenblatt, 1971
- Eustomias globulifer Regan & Trewavas, 1930
- Eustomias grandibulbus Gibbs, T. A. Clarke & J. R. Gomon, 1983
- Eustomias hulleyi J. R. Gomon & Gibbs, 1985
- Eustomias hypopsilus J. R. Gomon & Gibbs, 1985
- Eustomias ignotus J. R. Gomon & Gibbs, 1985
- Eustomias inconstans Gibbs, T. A. Clarke & J. R. Gomon, 1983
- Eustomias insularum T. A. Clarke, 1998
- Eustomias intermedius T. A. Clarke, 1998
- Eustomias interruptus T. A. Clarke, 1999
- Eustomias ioani Parin & Pokhil'skaya, 1974
- Eustomias jimcraddocki Sutton & Hartel, 2004
- Eustomias kikimora Prokofiev, 2015
- Eustomias kreffti Gibbs, T. A. Clarke & J. R. Gomon, 1983
- Eustomias lanceolatus T. A. Clarke, 1999
- Eustomias leptobolus Regan & Trewavas, 1930
- Eustomias lipochirus Regan & Trewavas, 1930
- Eustomias longibarba A. E. Parr, 1927
- Eustomias longiramis T. A. Clarke, 2001
- Eustomias macronema Regan & Trewavas, 1930 (Bigbarb dragonfish)
- Eustomias macrophthalmus A. E. Parr, 1927
- Eustomias macrurus Regan & Trewavas, 1930 (Yellowstem dragonfish)
- Eustomias magnificus T. A. Clarke, 2001
- Eustomias medusa Gibbs, T. A. Clarke & J. R. Gomon, 1983
- Eustomias melanonema Regan & Trewavas, 1930
- Eustomias melanostigma Regan & Trewavas, 1930
- Eustomias melanostigmoides Gibbs, T. A. Clarke & J. R. Gomon, 1983
- Eustomias mesostenus Gibbs, T. A. Clarke & J. R. Gomon, 1983
- Eustomias metamelas J. R. Gomon & Gibbs, 1985
- Eustomias micraster A. E. Parr, 1927
- Eustomias micropterygius A. E. Parr, 1927
- Eustomias minimus T. A. Clarke, 1999
- Eustomias monoclonoides T. A. Clarke, 1999
- Eustomias monoclonus Regan & Trewavas, 1930
- Eustomias monodactylus Regan & Trewavas, 1930
- Eustomias multifilis Parin & Pokhil'skaya, 1978 (Multi-thread dragonfish)
- Eustomias obscurus Vaillant, 1884
- Eustomias orientalis Gibbs, T. A. Clarke & J. R. Gomon, 1983
- Eustomias pacificus Gibbs, T. A. Clarke & J. R. Gomon, 1983
- Eustomias parini T. A. Clarke, 2001 (Parin's dragonfish)
- Eustomias parri Regan & Trewavas, 1930
- Eustomias patulus Regan & Trewavas, 1930
- Eustomias paucifilis A. E. Parr, 1927
- Eustomias paxtoni T. A. Clarke, 2001
- Eustomias perplexus Gibbs, T. A. Clarke & J. R. Gomon, 1983
- Eustomias pinnatus T. A. Clarke, 1999
- Eustomias polyaster A. E. Parr, 1927
- Eustomias posti Gibbs, T. A. Clarke & J. R. Gomon, 1983
- Eustomias precarius J. R. Gomon & Gibbs, 1985
- Eustomias problematicus T. A. Clarke, 2001
- Eustomias pyrifer Regan & Trewavas, 1930
- Eustomias quadrifilis J. R. Gomon & Gibbs, 1985
- Eustomias radicifilis Borodin, 1930
- Eustomias satterleei Beebe, 1933 (Twinray dragonfish)
- Eustomias schiffi Beebe, 1932
- Eustomias schmidti Regan & Trewavas, 1930 (Schmidt's dragonfish)
- Eustomias securicula Prokofiev & Orlov, 2022
- Eustomias silvescens Regan & Trewavas, 1930
- Eustomias similis Parin, 1978
- Eustomias simplex Regan & Trewavas, 1930
- Eustomias spherulifer Gibbs, T. A. Clarke & J. R. Gomon, 1983
- Eustomias stamen Koeda & Ho, 2019 (Stamen dragonfish)
- Eustomias suluensis Gibbs, T. A. Clarke & J. R. Gomon, 1983
- Eustomias tenisoni Regan & Trewavas, 1930
- Eustomias tetranema Zugmayer, 1913
- Eustomias teuthidopsis Gibbs, T. A. Clarke & J. R. Gomon, 1983
- Eustomias tomentosis T. A. Clarke, 1998
- Eustomias trewavasae Norman, 1930 (Deepsea dragonfish)
- Eustomias triramis Regan & Trewavas, 1930
- Eustomias tritentaculatus Koeda & Ho, 2019 (Three-tentacled dragonfish)
- Eustomias uniramis T. A. Clarke, 1999
- Eustomias variabilis Regan & Trewavas, 1930
- Eustomias vitiazi Parin & Pokhil'skaya, 1974 (Vitiaz dragonfish)
- Eustomias vulgaris T. A. Clarke, 2001 (Common dragonfish)
- Eustomias woollardi T. A. Clarke, 1998
- Eustomias xenobolus Regan & Trewavas, 1930
