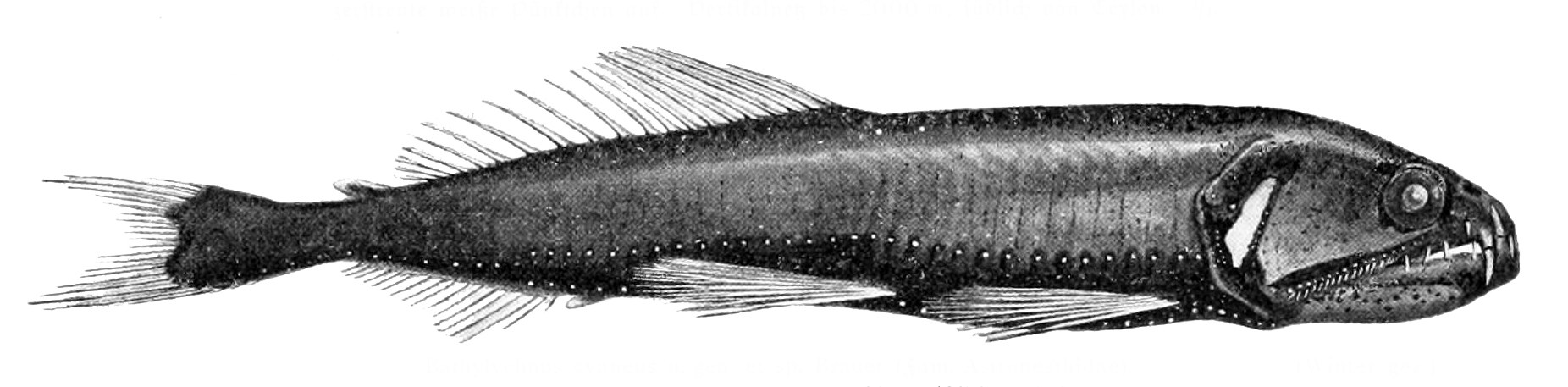

Scientific classification
- Kingdom: Animalia
- Phylum: Chordata
- Class: Actinopterygii
- Order: Stomiiformes
- Family: Stomiidae
- Genus: Astronesthes
- Species: A. cyaneus

Binomial name
- Astronesthes cyaneus Brauer, 1902

= Astronesthes cyaneus =

Species of fish

Astronesthes cyaneus is a deep sea fish in the family Stomiidae.
