= Astronesthes chrysophekadion =

Scientific classification
- Kingdom: Animalia
- Phylum: Chordata
- Class: Actinopterygii
- Order: Stomiiformes
- Family: Stomiidae
- Genus: Astronesthes
- Species: A. chrysophekadion

Binomial name
- Astronesthes chrysophekadion (Bleeker, 1849)

Synonyms
- Stomianodon chrysophekadion Bleeker, 1849

Species of fish

Astronesthes chrysophekadion is a deep sea fish in the family Stomiidae.
