= Astronesthes decoratus =

Scientific classification
- Kingdom: Animalia
- Phylum: Chordata
- Class: Actinopterygii
- Order: Stomiiformes
- Family: Stomiidae
- Genus: Astronesthes
- Species: A. decoratus

Binomial name
- Astronesthes decoratus Parin & Borodulina, 2002

Species of fish

Astronesthes decoratus is a deep sea fish in the family Stomiidae, that can be found in portions of the Atlantic Ocean.
