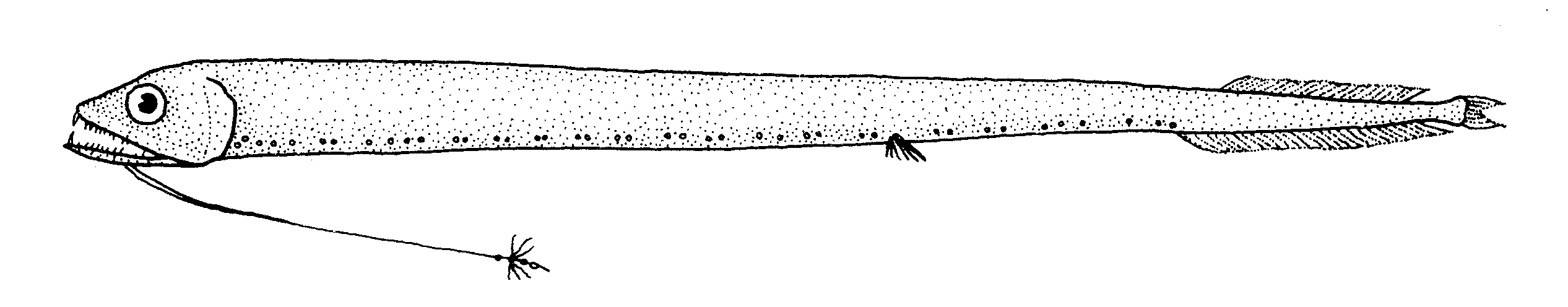

Scientific classification
- Kingdom: Animalia
- Phylum: Chordata
- Class: Actinopterygii
- Order: Stomiiformes
- Family: Stomiidae
- Genus: Eustomias
- Species: E. trewavasae

Binomial name
- Eustomias trewavasae Norman, 1930

= Eustomias trewavasae =

Species of fish

Eustomias trewavasae, the deepsea dragonfish, is a small abyssal barbeled dragonfish of the family Stomiidae, found worldwide in tropical and subtropical oceans at depths down to 1,500 m. Its length is up to 26 centimetres (10 in) TL.

Named in honor of Ethelwynn Trewavas (1900-1993), British Museum (Natural History), for her work on the stomiid fishes of the Dana expeditions.
