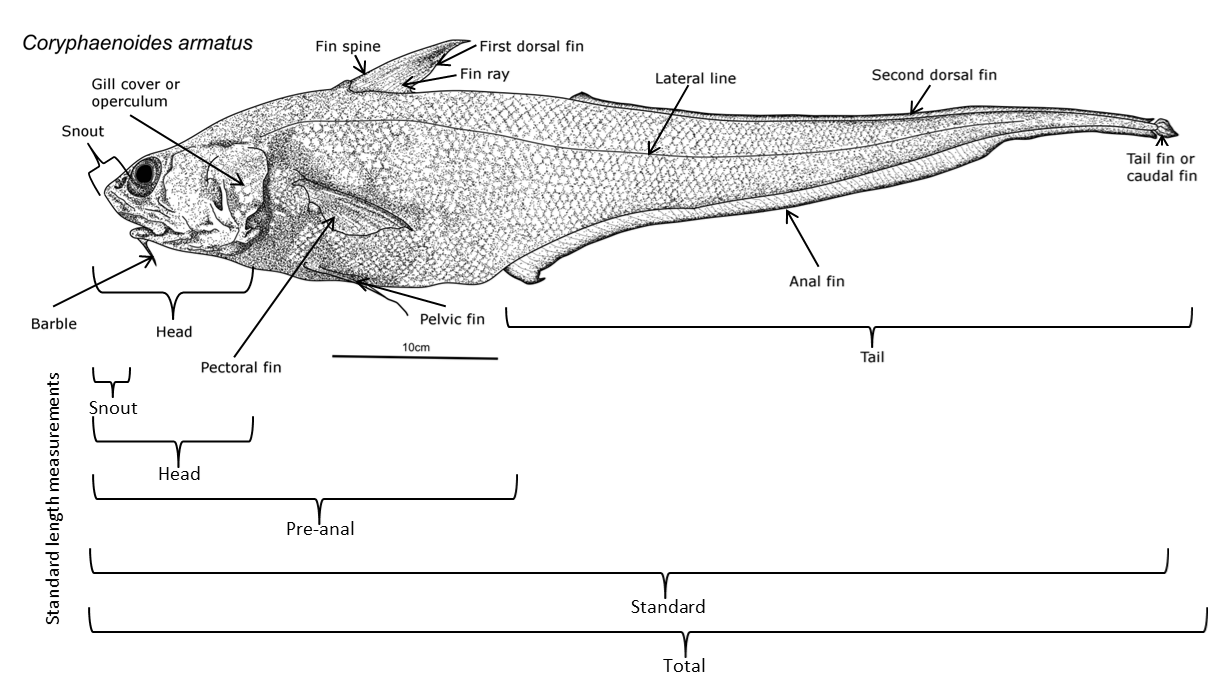
- Abyssal grenadier, Coryphaenoides armatus

Conservation status
- Least Concern (IUCN 3.1)

Scientific classification
- Kingdom: Animalia
- Phylum: Chordata
- Class: Actinopterygii
- Order: Gadiformes
- Suborder: Macrouroidei
- Family: Macrouridae
- Genus: Coryphaenoides
- Species: C. armatus

Binomial name
- Coryphaenoides armatus (Hector, 1875)

Synonyms
- Macrurus armatus Hector, 1875; Nematonurus armatus (Hector, 1875); Coryphaenoides variabilis Günther, 1878; Macrurus asper Goode & Bean, 1883; Macrurus goodii Günther, 1887; Coryphaenoides gigas Vaillant, 1888; Nematonurus gigas (Vaillant, 1888); Nematonurus cyclolepis Gilbert, 1896; Coryphaenoides cyclolepis (Gilbert, 1896); Dolloa cyclolepis (Gilbert, 1896); Macrurus cyclolepis (Gilbert, 1896); Moseleya cyclolepis (Gilbert, 1896); Macrurus suborbitalis Gill & Townsend, 1897; Coryphaenoides suborbitalis (Gill & Townsend, 1897); Nematonurus suborbitalis (Gill & Townsend, 1897); Nematonurus abyssorum Gilbert, 1915; Coryphaenoides abyssorum (Gilbert, 1915)

= Abyssal grenadier =

Species of fish

The abyssal grenadier, Coryphaenoides armatus, is an abyssal fish of the genus Coryphaenoides, found in all the world's oceans, at depths between 800 and 5,493 metres (2,625 and 18,022 ft). Its adult length is 20 to 40 centimetres (8 to 16 in), although Fishbase gives lengths up to 1 metre (3 ft 3 in). The abyssal grenadier's body is unique in that it contains two dorsal spines and about 124 dorsal soft rays, which are the flexible jointed rays supporting a fin nearest to the back in the spinal column. It has no anal spines, but has 115 anal soft rays along its body. The head and eyes of this fish are very large, while the mouth is very small. The color of the abyssal grenadier is brown apart from the abdomen, which is bluish.

== Overview ==
Coryphaenoides armatus occurs at the deep-slope, on the upper continental rise between 2,000 m and 4,700 m. However, they have been observed at depths between 282 m and 5493 m. This depth range is dependent on the ocean as C. armatus lives in depths between 2000 and 4800 meters in the Atlantic and Indian Oceans but are limited to nutrient-dense environments between 2000 and 4300 meters in the Pacific Ocean. Its diet changes as it matures, from benthic invertebrates such as crustaceans and holothuroids when young to mesopelagic and bathypelagic fish, sea urchins and cephalopods when adult. The sensory specialty of C. armatus also changes over its lifecycle; juveniles are more reliant on sight than olfaction, but developed adults are considered to be olfactory specialists. Very few ripe females, and no spent individuals have been collected, and this is suggestive of this species being semelparous. A study done on the influence of carrion supply in the role of temporal changes in grenadier abundance showed a direct positive correlation to amount of carrion and the population of abyssal grenadier in the eastern North Pacific.

== Feeding and hunting behavior ==
C. armatus' diet is mainly composed of mid-water cephalopods and fishes, but it can also consume echinoderms. Examination of the stomach contents of specimens collected by trawling below 2,600 m deep in the Hudson Canyon showed that an important proportion of the diet of C. armatus is caught in the deep mesopelagic and bathypelagic regions. Though the diet of C. armatus largely consists of animals, these fish have been observed to opportunistically consume phytodetritus, especially in regions where phytodetritus falls are more common. This finding was supported by researchers who found a positive correlation between increased swim speed in months with increased levels of benthic nutrient enrichment via marine snow. Research studies focused on the feeding and foraging habits of C. armatus has revealed that this species follows an active foraging strategy consistent with the optimal foraging theory. C. armatus has been observed to maintain low metabolic rates and slow aerobic activity in their foraging; these behaviors are thought to reflect a need to conserve energy due to the extreme environmental conditions and food scarcity that exists in C. armatus' natural habitats.

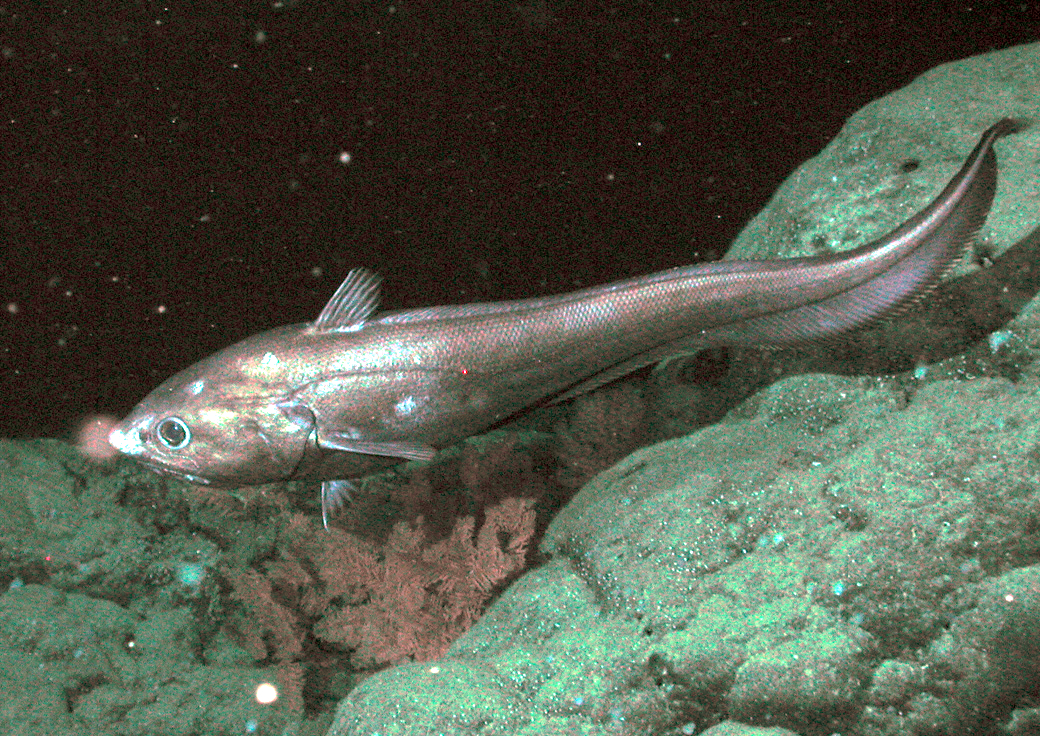
On the Davidson Seamount at 2253 meters depth

Coryphaenoides armatus is seen in this video describing the operation and use of an autonomous lander (RV Kaharoa) in deep sea research
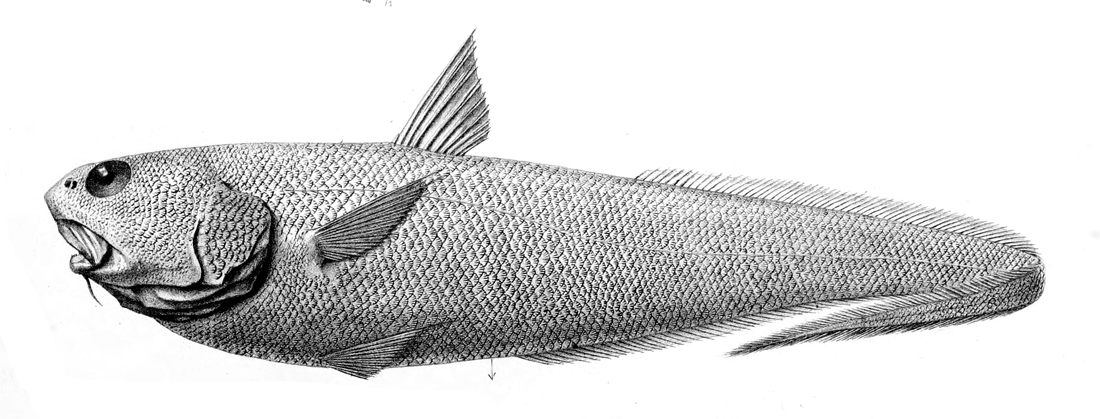

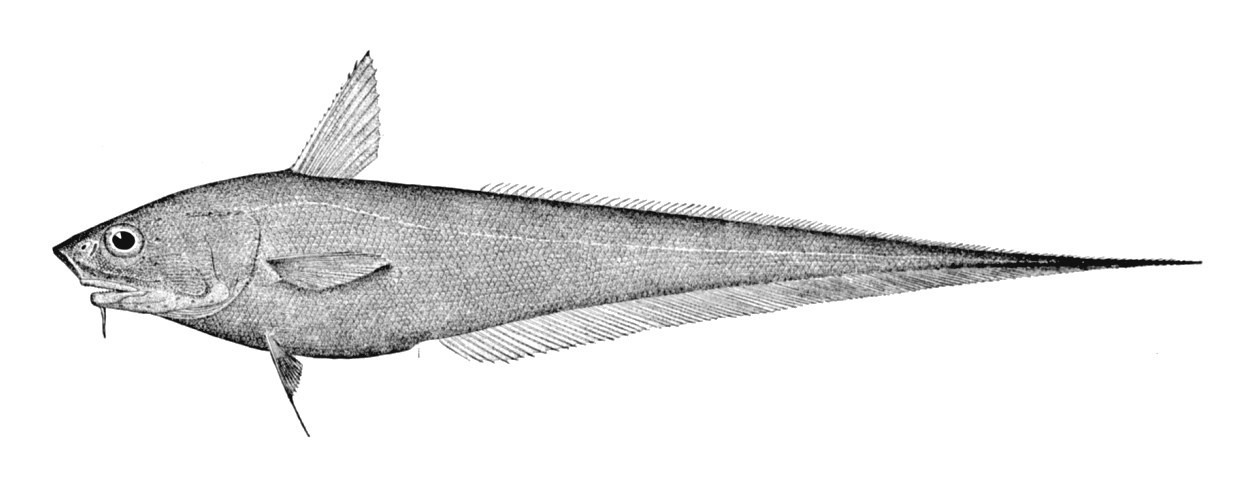
Abyssal grenadier, Coryphaenoides armatus

== See also ==
- Grenadiers (fish)
- Coryphaenoides yaquinae
