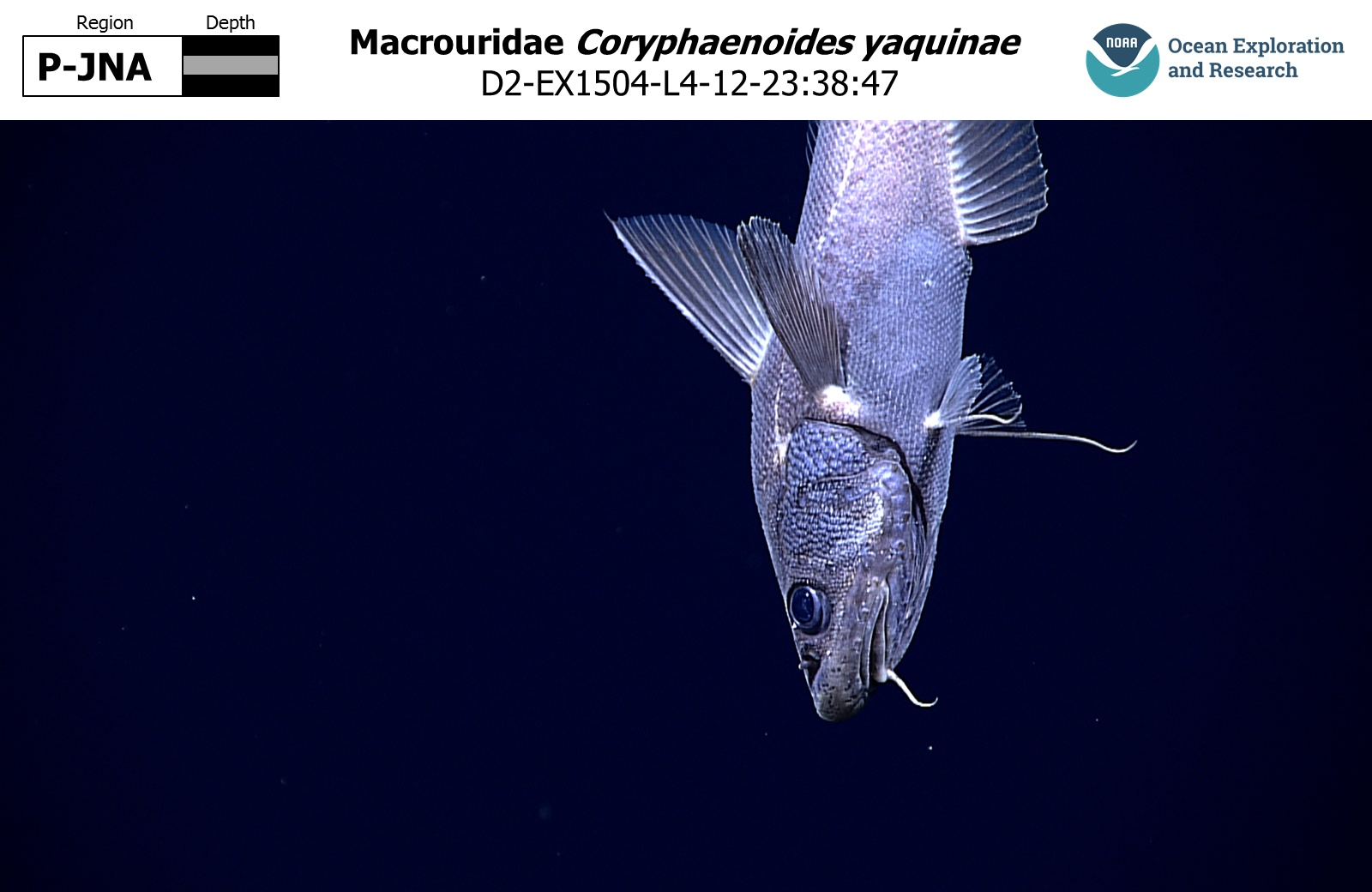
- Front half specimen collected during a dive from the Okeanos Explorer in 2015

Scientific classification
- Kingdom: Animalia
- Phylum: Chordata
- Class: Actinopterygii
- Order: Gadiformes
- Family: Macrouridae
- Genus: Coryphaenoides
- Species: C. yaquinae

Binomial name
- Coryphaenoides yaquinae (Iwamoto & Stein, 1974)

= Coryphaenoides yaquinae =

Species of fish

The rough abyssal grenadier (Coryphaenoides yaquinae) is a species of deep-sea grenadier fish in the family Macrouridae. First described as a separate species in 1974, the rough abyssal grenadier was historically confused with its congener, Coryphaenoides armatus. Unlike C. armatus, which has been recorded in the waters of the Atlantic, Pacific, Indian, and Southern oceans, observations of C. yaquinae have been confined exclusively to the Pacific ocean. C. yaquinae tends to inhabit abyssopelagic depths between 3,400 and 5,800 meters (11,200 and 19,000 ft). However, observations of C. yaquinae have been made as deep as 6,945 meters (22,785 ft) in the Japan Trench and 7,012 meters (23,005 ft) in the Mariana Trench. C. yaquinae is the only known macrourid from the hadal zone.

== Diet and ecology ==
The rough abyssal grenadier is an active benthic forager, with a diet that features a variety of seafloor fauna. Squids, crustaceans, and polychaetes comprise the most consistent sources of prey for C. yaquinae, though stomach content analyses have revealed echinoderms, fish, and food scavenged from carrion. The availability of these food sources varies, however, as seasonal migrations of pelagic teleosts and changes in the rate of phytodetritus affect the amount of organic matter that reaches the ocean floor.
