= Astronesthes fedorovi =

Conservation status
- Least Concern (IUCN 3.1)

Scientific classification
- Kingdom: Animalia
- Phylum: Chordata
- Class: Actinopterygii
- Division: Teleostei
- Order: Stomiiformes
- Family: Stomiidae
- Genus: Astronesthes
- Species: A. fedorovi

Binomial name
- Astronesthes fedorovi Parin and Borodulina, 1994

Species of fish

Astronesthes fedorovi is a deep sea fish in the family Stomiidae.
