= Eustomias jimcraddocki =

Scientific classification
- Kingdom: Animalia
- Phylum: Chordata
- Class: Actinopterygii
- Order: Stomiiformes
- Family: Stomiidae
- Genus: Eustomias
- Species: E. jimcraddocki

Binomial name
- Eustomias jimcraddocki Sutton & Hartel, 2004

Species of fish

Eustomias jimcraddocki is a species of abyssal barbeled dragonfish of the family Stomiidae, found in the western North Atlantic. Eustomias jimcraddocki can grow to a length of 14.33 centimetres (5.64 in) SL.
