= Andrewesius =

Scientific classification
- Domain: Eukaryota
- Kingdom: Animalia
- Phylum: Arthropoda
- Class: Insecta
- Order: Coleoptera
- Suborder: Adephaga
- Family: Carabidae
- Subfamily: Platyninae
- Tribe: Platynini
- Subtribe: Platynina
- Genus: Andrewesius; Andrewes, 1939

Genus of beetles

Andrewesius is a genus in the beetle family Carabidae. There are more than 20 described species in Andrewesius. Most species are found in China, although a few are found in Myanmar, Nepal, and India.

== Species ==
These 27 species belong to the genus Andrewesius:

- Andrewesius amicus Kryzhanovskij, 1995 (China)
- Andrewesius arlettae Morvan, 1998 (China)
- Andrewesius boulbeni Morvan, 1998 (China)
- Andrewesius cavazzutii Morvan, 1998 (China)
- Andrewesius coeruleatus (Fairmaire, 1891) (China)
- Andrewesius delavayi Morvan, 1997 (China)
- Andrewesius fedorovi Kryzhanovskij, 1994 (China)
- Andrewesius glasaour Morvan, 1998 (China)
- Andrewesius intermedius Morvan & Tian, 2003 (China)
- Andrewesius kambaiticola (Landin, 1955) (Myanmar)
- Andrewesius largomarginatus Morvan, 2002 (China)
- Andrewesius ollivieri Morvan, 1997 (China)
- Andrewesius omeishanicus Kryzhanovskij, 1994 (China)
- Andrewesius pratti (Bates, 1891) (China)
- Andrewesius remondi Morvan, 1997 (China)
- Andrewesius renati (Landin, 1955) (Myanmar)
- Andrewesius rougemonti Morvan, 1997 (China)
- Andrewesius rutilans Morvan & Tian, 2003 (China)
- Andrewesius subsericatus (Fairmaire, 1886) (China)
- Andrewesius szetschuanus (Jedlicka, 1932) (China)
- Andrewesius tibetanus Morvan, 2002 (China)
- Andrewesius troncatus (Morvan, 2004) (Nepal)
- Andrewesius vikara (Andrewes, 1923) (China, India, and Myanmar)
- Andrewesius vimmeri Jedlicka, 1932 (China)
- Andrewesius vulpinus (Andrewes, 1923) (India)
- Andrewesius yunnanus (Csiki, 1931) (China)
- Andrewesius zezeae (Csiki, 1931) (China)
