= Robert Henry Gibbs =

American ichthyologist

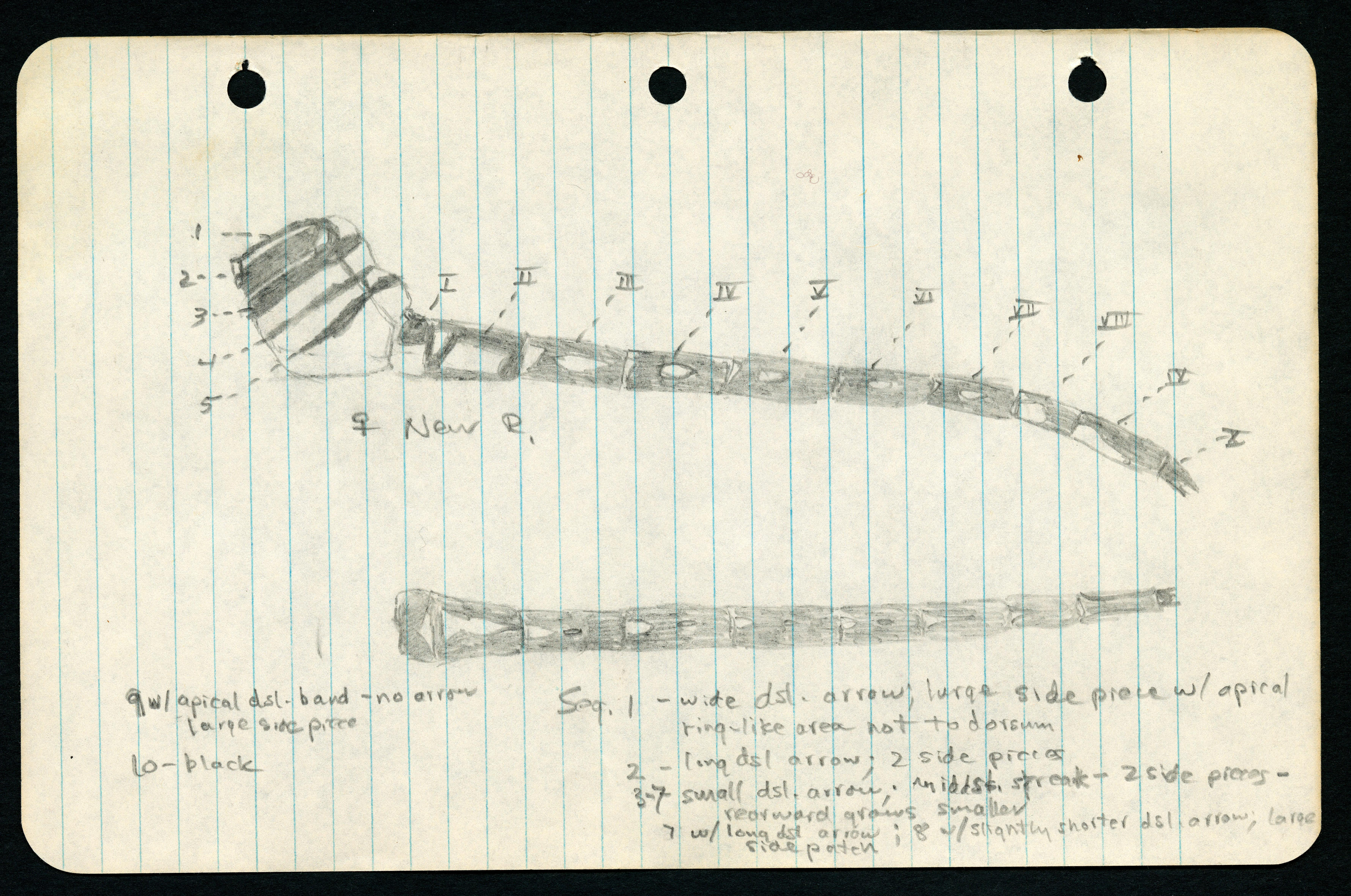
A page from Gibbs' field notebook

Robert Henry Gibbs Jr. (1929–1988) was an American ichthyologist. He was a long-standing curator at the National Museum of Natural History and devoted much of his career to the study of pelagic and deep-sea fishes. He was also an avid conservationist and a member of the American Society of Ichthyologists and Herpetologists for over 30 years.

The Society honored him posthumously with the Robert H. Gibbs Jr. Memorial Award for Excellence in Systematic Ichthyology, whose recipients have included shark authority Leonard J.V. Compagno, and anglerfish authority Theodore W. Pietsch.

== See also ==
- Category:Taxa named by Robert Henry Gibbs
