= Deep scattering layer =

Layer of small animals in the ocean

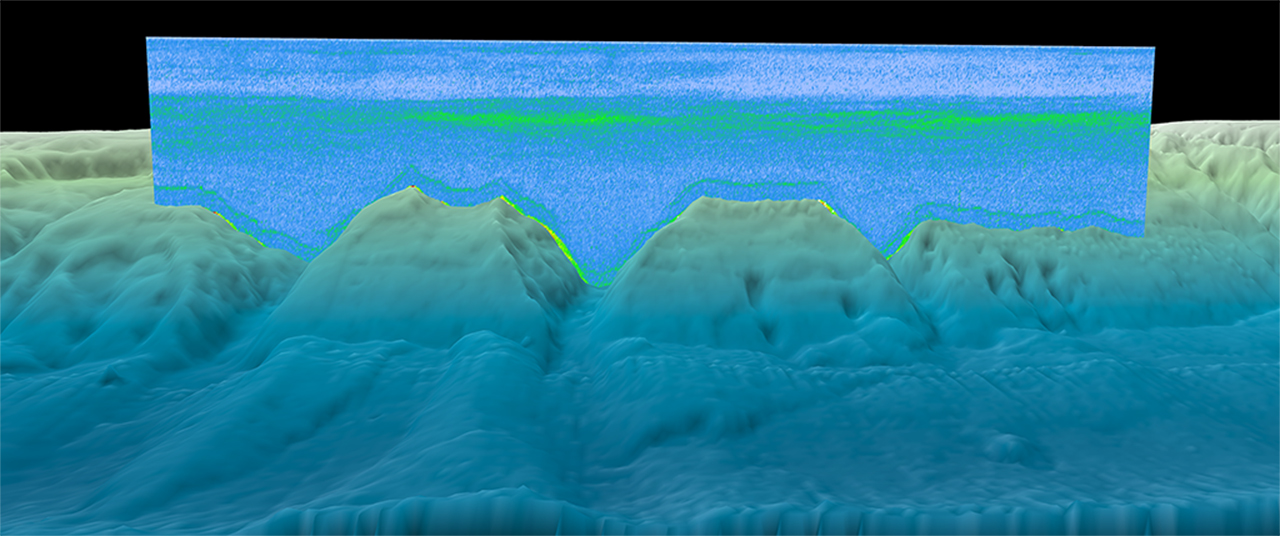
Static image of a sonar scan. The backscattered signal (green) above the bottom is likely the deep scattering layer.

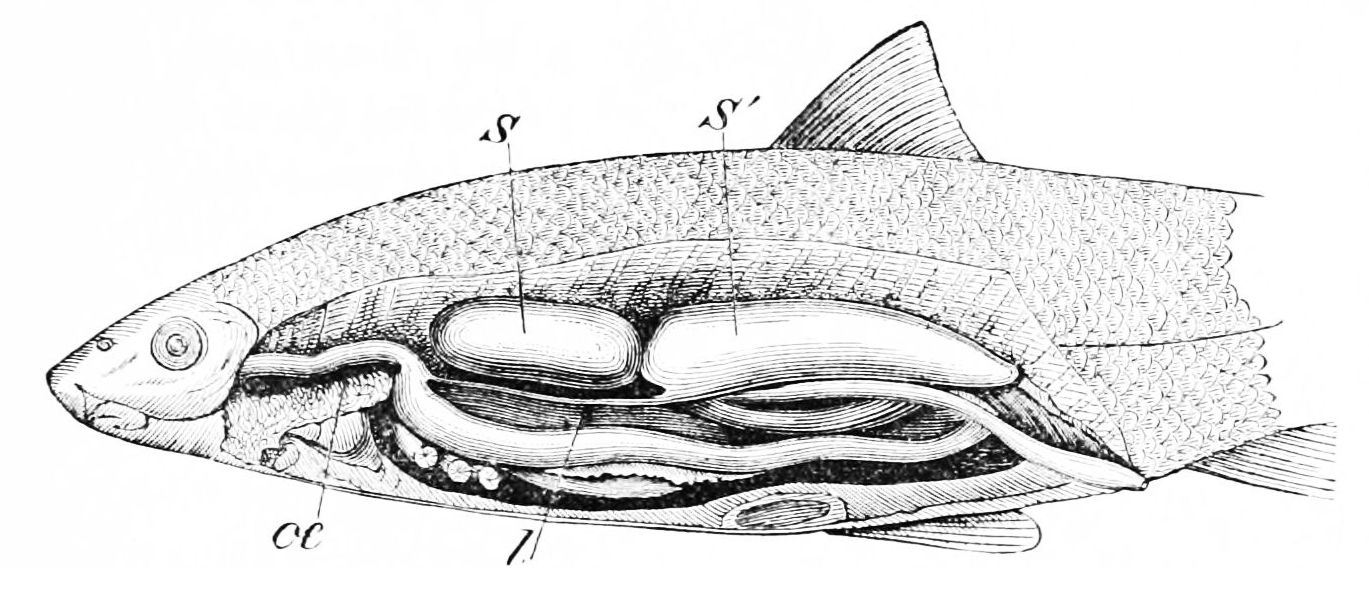
The swim bladder (marked here as S and S') of Alburnoides bipunctatus. The swim bladders of large numbers of mesopelagic fishes cause sonar waves to be reflected in a recognisable layer.

The deep scattering layer, sometimes referred to as the sound scattering layer, is a layer in the ocean consisting of a variety of marine animals. It was discovered through the use of sonar, as ships found a layer that scattered the sound and was thus sometimes mistaken for the seabed. For this reason it is sometimes called the false bottom or phantom bottom. It can be seen to rise and fall each day in keeping with diel vertical migration.

Sonar operators, using the newly developed sonar technology during World War II, were puzzled by what appeared to be a false sea floor 300–500 metres (980–1,640 ft) deep at day, and less deep at night. Initially, this mysterious phenomenon was called the ECR layer using the initials of its three discoverers. It turned out to be due to millions of marine organisms, most particularly small mesopelagic fish, with swim bladders that reflected the sonar. These organisms migrate up into shallower water at dusk to feed on plankton. The layer is deeper when the moon is out, and can become shallower when clouds pass over the moon. Lanternfish account for much of the biomass responsible for the deep scattering layer of the world's oceans. Sonar reflects off the millions of lanternfish swim bladders, giving the appearance of a false bottom.

== Description ==
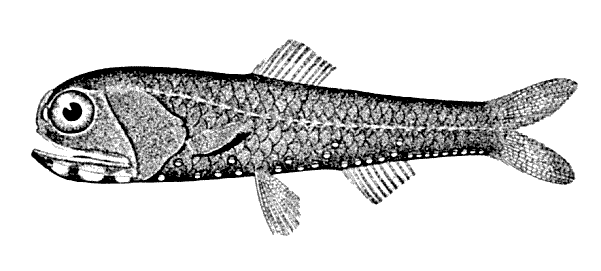
Lanternfish account for as much as 65 percent of all deep sea fish biomass and are largely responsible for the deep scattering layer of the world's oceans.

The phantom bottom is caused by the sonar misinterpreting as the ocean floor a layer of small seagoing creatures that congregate between 1,000 and 1,500 feet (300 and 460 m) below the surface. The name is derived from the fact that the first people to see these measurements erroneously reported that they had discovered sunken islands. Most mesopelagic fishes are small filter feeders which ascend at night to feed in the nutrient rich waters of the epipelagic zone. During the day, they return to the dark, cold, oxygen deficient waters of the mesopelagic where they are relatively safe from predators.

Most mesopelagic organisms, including mesopelagic fish, squid and siphonophores, make daily vertical migrations. They ascend at night into the shallow epipelagic zone, often following similar migrations of zooplankton, and return to the mesopelagic depths for safety when there is daylight. These vertical migrations often occur over large vertical distances. Fish undertake these migrations with the assistance of a swimbladder. The swimbladder is inflated when the fish wants to move up, and, due to the high pressures in the mesopelagic zone, this requires significant energy. As the fish ascends, the pressure in the swimbladder must adjust to prevent it from bursting. When the fish wants to return to the depths, the swimbladder is deflated. Some mesopelagic fishes make daily migrations through the thermocline, where the temperature changes between 10 and 20 °C (50 and 68 °F), thus displaying considerable tolerance for temperature change.

In 1998, sampling via deep trawling indicated lanternfish account for as much as 65% of all deep sea fish biomass. Lanternfish are among the most widely distributed, populous, and diverse of all vertebrates, playing an important ecological role as prey for larger organisms. The previous estimated global biomass of lanternfish was 550–660 million tonnes, about six times the annual tonnage captured worldwide by fisheries. However, this was revised upwards as these fish have a special gland for detecting movement from up to 30 metres (98 ft) away (e.g. fishing nets and fish sampling nets). In 2007 global sonar detectors indicated a more accurate figure for the global biomass was between 5 and 10 billion tonnes.

Time lapse video of a 3D mapping of water column sonar data by the NOAA research ship Okeanos Explorer in the North Atlantic Ocean

== See also ==
- Diel vertical migration
- False bottom (sea ice)

== Further references ==
- Bone Q and Moore RH (2008) Biology of Fishes Taylor & Francis Group. ISBN 978-0-415-37562-7
