= Phytodetritus =

In oceanography, phytodetritus is the organic particulate matter resulting from phytoplankton and other organic material in surface waters falling to the seabed. This process takes place almost continuously as a "marine snow" of descending particles, falling at the rate of about 100 to 150 m (328 to 492 ft) per day. Under certain conditions, phytoplankton may aggregate and fall rapidly through the water column to arrive little changed on the seabed. These fluxes sometimes occur seasonally or periodically, are sometimes associated with algal blooms and may constitute the greater part of descending organic matter. If the amount is greater than the benthic detritivores can process, the phytodetritus forms a fluffy layer on the surface of the sediment. It accumulates in many shallow and deep water locations throughout the world.

Phytodetritus varies in colour and appearance and may be greenish, brown or grey, flocculent or gelatinous. It includes the microscopic remains of diatoms, dinoflagellates, dictyochales, coccolithophores, foraminiferans, phaeodareans, tintinnids, crustacean eggs and moults, protozoan faecal pellets, picoplankton and other planktonic matter embedded in a membranous gelatinous matrix. One of the most important genera of forams is Globigerina; vast areas of the ocean floor are covered with "Globigerina ooze", so named by Murray and Renard in 1873, dominated by the shells of planktonic forms. Larger materials may also be present including large animal remains such as carcases, large fragments of plant and faecal matter.
