= Deep-sea fish =

Fauna found in deep-sea areas

External videos
- Creatures and Fish of the Deep Ocean – National Geographic documentary

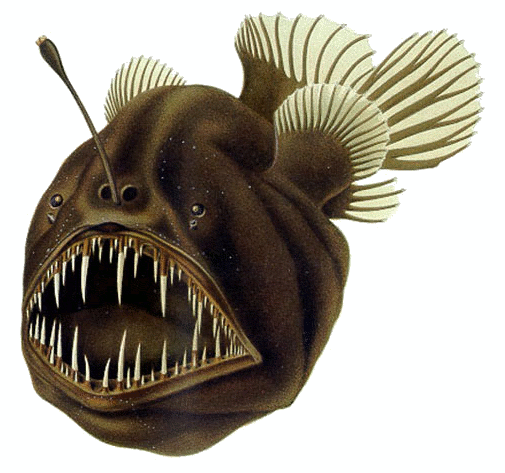
Humpback anglerfish

Deep-sea fish are fish that live in the darkness below the sunlit surface waters, that is below the epipelagic or photic zone of the sea. The lanternfish is, by far, the most common deep-sea fish. Other deep-sea fishes include the flashlight fish, cookiecutter shark, bristlemouths, anglerfish, viperfish, and some species of eelpout.

Only about 2% of known marine species inhabit the pelagic environment. This means that they live in the water column as opposed to the benthic organisms that live in or on the sea floor. Deep-sea organisms generally inhabit bathypelagic (1–4 km; 0.62–2.49 mi deep) and abyssopelagic (4–6 km; 2.5–3.7 mi deep) zones. However, characteristics of deep-sea organisms, such as bioluminescence can be seen in the mesopelagic (200–1,000 m; 660–3,280 ft deep) zone as well. The mesopelagic zone is the disphotic zone, meaning light there is minimal but still measurable. The oxygen minimum layer exists somewhere between a depth of 700 and 1,000 metres (2,300 and 3,300 ft) depending on the place in the ocean. This area is also where nutrients are most abundant. The bathypelagic and abyssopelagic zones are aphotic, meaning that no light penetrates this area of the ocean. These zones make up about 75% of the inhabitable ocean space.

The epipelagic zone (0–200 metres or 0–650 ft deep) is the area where light penetrates the water and photosynthesis occurs. This is also known as the photic zone. Because this typically extends only a few hundred meters below the water, the deep sea, about 90% of the ocean volume, is in darkness. The deep sea is also an extremely hostile environment, with temperatures that rarely exceed 3 °C (37 °F) and fall as low as −1.8 °C (29 °F) (with the exception of hydrothermal vent ecosystems that can exceed 350 °C, or 662 °F), low oxygen levels, and pressures between 20 and 1000 atm (2-100 MPa, 300–14,500 psi).

== Evolution ==
It has been speculated that deep-sea ecosystems may have been inhospitable to vertebrate life prior to an increased influx of nutrients into the ocean during the Late Jurassic and Early Cretaceous following the rise of angiosperms on land, which led to an increase in abyssal invertebrate life, allowing fish to in turn colonize these ecosystems. However, some modern deep-sea fish, such as holocephalians, are descendants of much older lineages, indicating that much earlier colonizations of the deep-sea by vertebrates may have occurred, although no fossil evidence of this is known.

The earliest known records of deep-sea fish are trace fossils of feeding and swimming behavior attributed to unidentified neoteleosts (referable to the ichnogenera Piscichnus and Undichna), from the Early Cretaceous (130 million-year-old) Palombini Shale of Italy, which is thought to have been deposited in the abyssal plain of the former Piemont-Liguria Ocean. Prior to the discovery of these fossils, there was no evidence for deep-sea bony fish older than 50 million years in the Paleogene. The Cretaceous origin for most modern deep-sea fish has been further affirmed with phylogenetic studies such as those of aulopiform fish, which indicate that many deep-sea lineages of these groups originated around this time.

Although the records from the Palombini Shale represent the earliest records of deep-sea bony fish, formations that preserve deepwater shark fossils are also known from later in the Cretaceous. These include the Northumberland Formation of Canada and similarly aged deposits in Angola, both of which preserve fossils of taxa such as hexanchids, chlamydoselachids, and catsharks, which are known from deepwater habitats today but rare in other formations of the time. Paleogene formations with fossil deep-sea shark teeth are known from New Zealand for the middle Paleocene, and formations in Denmark, France, Austria, and Morocco during the Eocene. The Paratethys Sea still supported deepwater sharks and rays into the Miocene, which are preserved in formations in Hungary.

During the Paleogene, some prominent formations that preserve well-articulated specimens of deep-sea bony fish are known. These include the Monte Solane lagerstatte of early Eocene Italy, which preserves a bathypelagic habitat likely deposited 300–600 meters (980–1,970 ft) under the sea, as well as the late Eocene Pabdeh Formation of Iran. The deep-sea environments preserved by both formations are apparent through their abundance of fossil stomiiform fish. Notable Neogene formations that preserve fossils of deep-sea bony fish are known from the Miocene of Italy, Japan, and California.

== Environment ==
Scale diagram of the layers of the pelagic zone

In the deep ocean, the waters extend far below the epipelagic zone, and support very different types of pelagic fishes adapted to living in these deeper zones. In deep water, marine snow is a continuous shower of mostly organic detritus falling from the upper layers of the water column. Its origin lies in activities within the productive photic zone. Marine snow includes dead or dying plankton, protists (diatoms), fecal matter, sand, soot and other inorganic dust. The "snowflakes" grow over time and may reach several centimetres in diameter, travelling for weeks before reaching the ocean floor. However, most organic components of marine snow are consumed by microbes, zooplankton and other filter-feeding animals within the first 1,000 metres (3,300 ft) of their journey, that is, within the epipelagic zone. In this way, marine snow may be considered the foundation of deep-sea mesopelagic and benthic ecosystems: as sunlight cannot reach them, deep-sea organisms rely heavily on marine snow as an energy source. Since there is no light in the deep sea (aphotic), there is a lack of primary producers. Therefore, most organisms in the bathypelagic rely on the marine snow from regions higher in the vertical column.

Some deep-sea pelagic groups, such as the lanternfish, ridgehead, marine hatchetfish, and lightfish families, are sometimes termed pseudoceanic because, rather than having an even distribution in open water, they occur in significantly higher abundances around structural oases, notably seamounts and over continental slopes. The phenomenon is explained by the likewise abundance of prey species which are also attracted to the structures.

Hydrostatic pressure increases by 1 atm (0.1 MPa) for every 10 m (33 ft) in depth. Deep-sea organisms have the same pressure within their bodies as is exerted on them from the outside, so they are not crushed by the extreme pressure. Their high internal pressure, however, results in the reduced fluidity of their membranes because molecules are squeezed together. Fluidity in cell membranes increases efficiency of biological functions, most importantly the production of proteins, so organisms have adapted to this circumstance by increasing the proportion of unsaturated fatty acids in the lipids of the cell membranes. In addition to differences in internal pressure, these organisms have developed a different balance between their metabolic reactions from those organisms that live in the epipelagic zone. David Wharton, author of Life at the Limits: Organisms in Extreme Environments, notes "Biochemical reactions are accompanied by changes in volume. If a reaction results in an increase in volume, it will be inhibited by pressure, whereas, if it is associated with a decrease in volume, it will be enhanced". This means that their metabolic processes must ultimately decrease the volume of the organism to some degree.

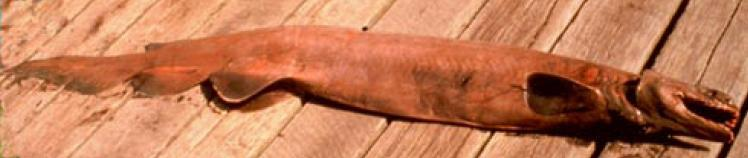
Humans seldom encounter frilled sharks alive, so they pose little danger (though scientists have accidentally cut themselves examining their teeth).

Most fish that have evolved in this harsh environment are not capable of surviving in laboratory conditions, and attempts to keep them in captivity have led to their deaths. Deep-sea organisms contain gas-filled spaces (vacuoles). Gas is compressed under high pressure and expands under low pressure. Because of this, these organisms have been known to blow up if they come to the surface.

== Characteristics ==
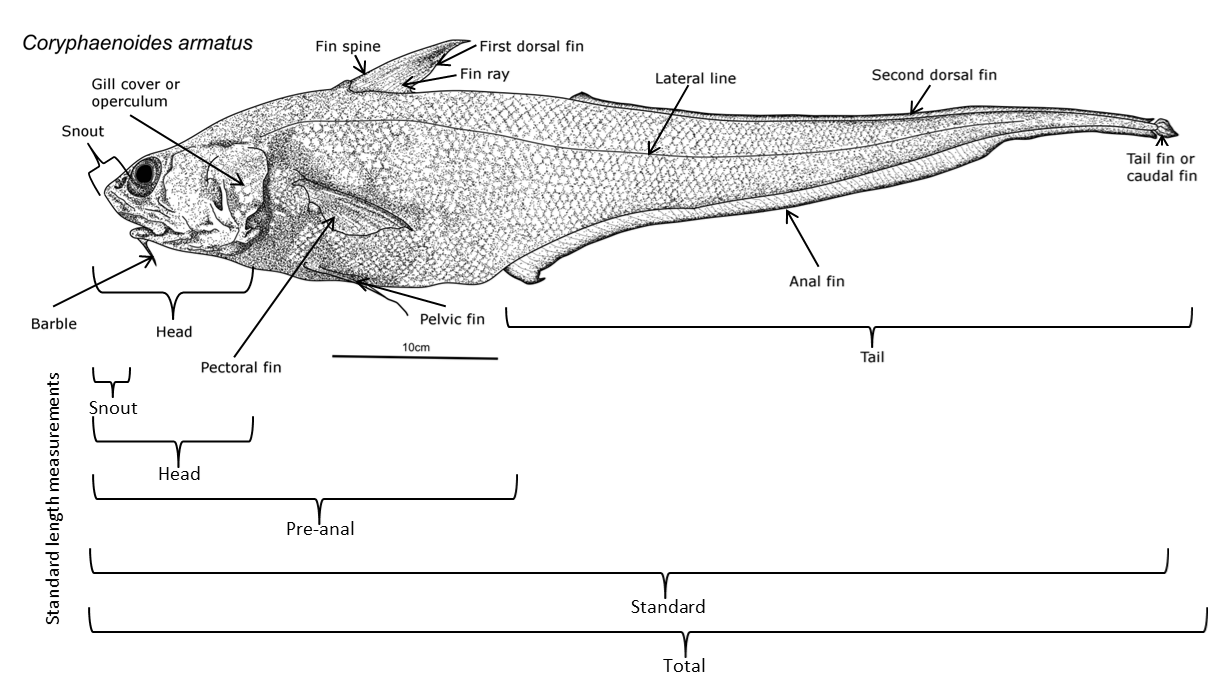
An annotated diagram of the basic external features of an abyssal grenadier and standard length measurements.

Rhinochimera atlantica

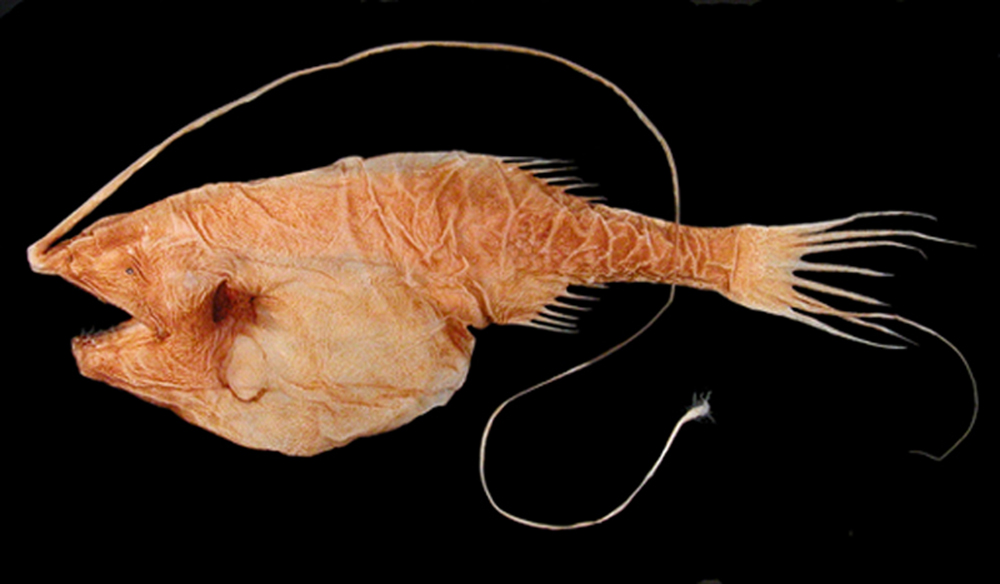
Gigantactis is a deep-sea fish with a dorsal fin whose first filament has become very long and is tipped with a bioluminescent photophore lure.

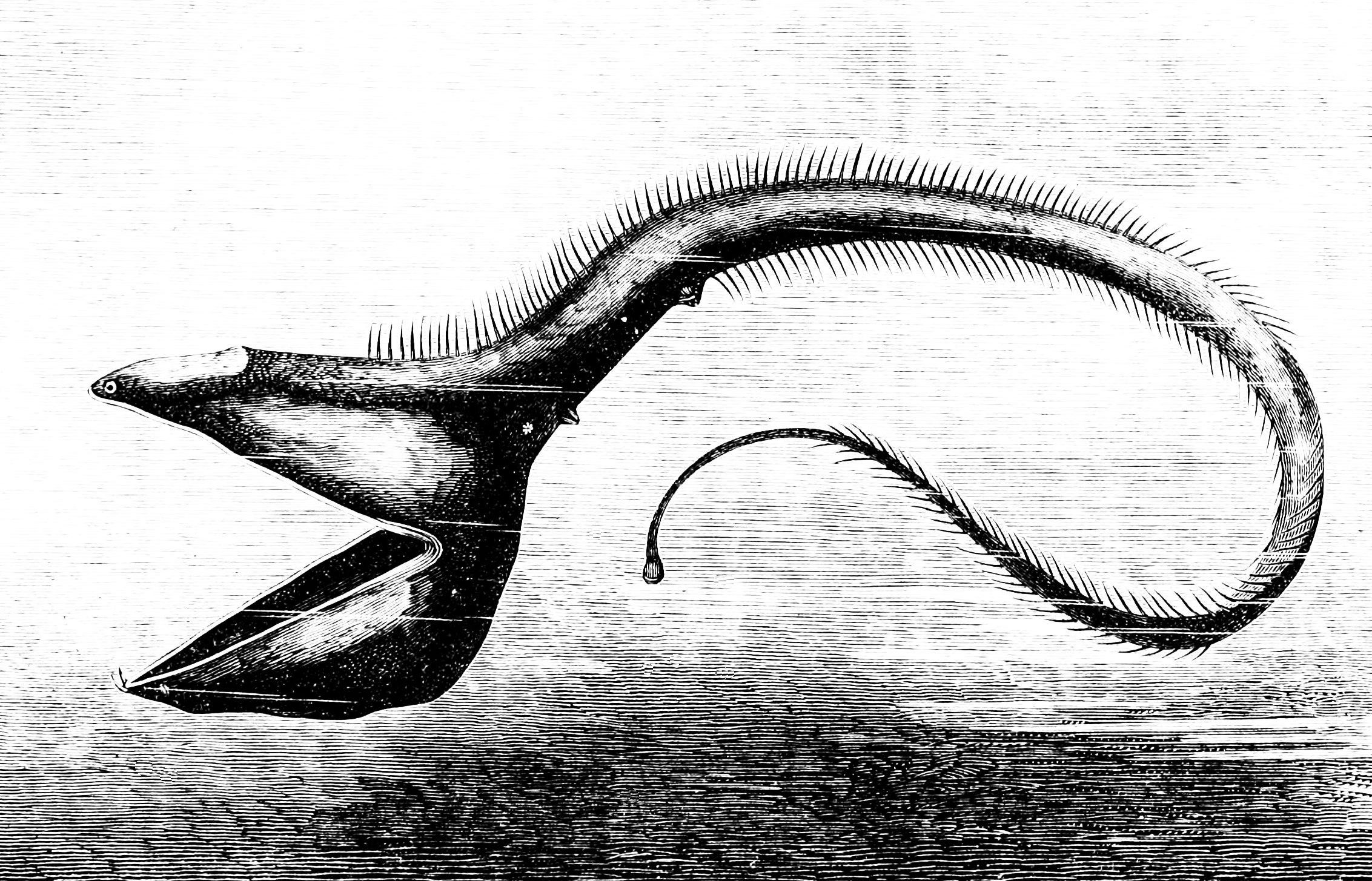
Pelican eel

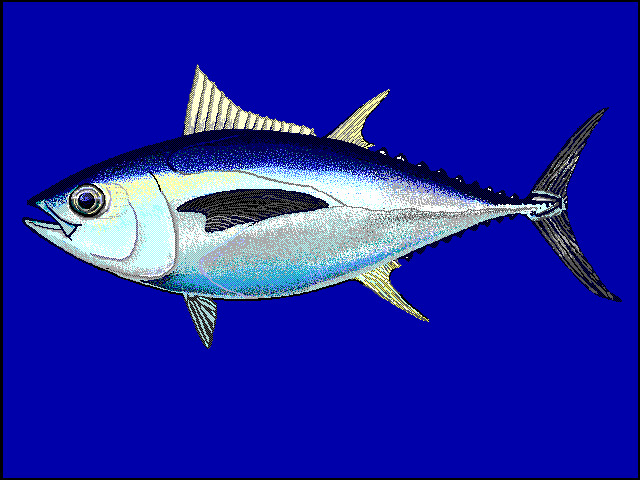
Bigeye tuna cruise the epipelagic zone at night and the mesopelagic zone during the day

The fish of the deep-sea have evolved various adaptations to survive in this region. Since many of these fish live in regions where there is no natural illumination, they cannot rely solely on their eyesight for locating prey and mates and avoiding predators; deep-sea fish have evolved appropriately to the extreme sub-photic region in which they live. Many of these organisms are blind and rely on their other senses, such as sensitivities to changes in local pressure and smell, to catch their food and avoid being caught. Those that aren't blind have large and sensitive eyes that can use bioluminescent light. These eyes can be as much as 100 times more sensitive to light than human eyes. Rhodopsin (Rh1) is a protein found in the eye's rod cells that helps animals see in dim light. While most vertebrates usually have one Rh1 opsin gene, some deep-sea fish have several Rh1 genes, and one species, the silver spinyfin (Diretmus argenteus), has 38. This proliferation of Rh1 genes may help deep-sea fish to see in the depths of the ocean. Also, to avoid predation, many species are dark to blend in with their environment.

Many deep-sea fish are bioluminescent, with extremely large eyes adapted to the dark. Bioluminescent organisms are capable of producing light biologically through the agitation of molecules of luciferin, which then produce light. This process must be done in the presence of oxygen. These organisms are common in the mesopelagic region and below (200 metres (656 ft) and below). More than 50% of deep-sea fish, as well as some species of shrimp and squid, are capable of bioluminescence. About 80% of these organisms have photophores – light producing glandular cells that contain luminous bacteria bordered by dark colourings. Some of these photophores contain lenses, much like those in the eyes of humans, which can intensify or lessen the emanation of light. The ability to produce light only requires 1% of the organism's energy and has many purposes: It is used to search for food and attract prey, like the anglerfish; claim territory through patrol; communicate and find a mate, and distract or temporarily blind predators to escape. Also, in the mesopelagic where some light still penetrates, some organisms camouflage themselves from predators below them by illuminating their bellies to match the colour and intensity of light from above so that no shadow is cast. This tactic is known as counter-illumination.

The lifecycle of deep-sea fish can be exclusively deep-water, although some species are born in shallower water and sink upon maturation. Regardless of the depth where eggs and larvae reside, they are typically pelagic. This planktonic — drifting — lifestyle requires neutral buoyancy. In order to maintain this, the eggs and larvae often contain oil droplets in their plasma. When these organisms are in their fully matured state they need other adaptations to maintain their positions in the water column. In general, water's density causes upthrust — the aspect of buoyancy that makes organisms float. To counteract this, the density of an organism must be greater than that of the surrounding water. Most animal tissues are denser than water, so they must find an equilibrium to make them float. Many organisms develop swim bladders (gas cavities) to stay afloat, but because of the high pressure of their environment, deep-sea fishes usually do not have this organ. Instead they exhibit structures similar to hydrofoils in order to provide hydrodynamic lift. It has also been found that the deeper a fish lives, the more jelly-like its flesh and the more minimal its bone structure. They reduce their tissue density through high fat content, reduction of skeletal weight — accomplished through reductions of size, thickness and mineral content — and water accumulation makes them slower and less agile than surface fish. The body shapes of deep-sea fish are generally better adapted for periodic bursts of swimming rather than constant swimming.

Due to the poor level of photosynthetic light reaching deep-sea environments, most fish need to rely on organic matter sinking from higher levels, or, in rare cases, hydrothermal vents for nutrients. This makes the deep-sea much poorer in productivity than shallower regions. Also, animals in the pelagic environment are sparse and food doesn't come along frequently. Because of this, organisms need adaptations that allow them to survive. Some have long feelers to help them locate prey or attract mates in the pitch black of the deep ocean. The deep-sea angler fish in particular has a long fishing-rod-like adaptation protruding from its face, on the end of which is a bioluminescent piece of skin that wriggles like a worm to lure its prey. Some must consume other fish that are the same size or larger than them and they need adaptations to help digest them efficiently. Great sharp teeth, hinged jaws, disproportionately large mouths, and expandable bodies are a few of the characteristics that deep-sea fishes have for this purpose. The gulper eel is one example of an organism that displays these characteristics.

Fish in the different pelagic and deep-water benthic zones are physically structured, and behave in ways, that differ markedly from each other. Groups of coexisting species within each zone all seem to operate in similar ways, such as the small mesopelagic vertically migrating plankton-feeders, the bathypelagic anglerfishes, and the deep-water benthic rattails.

Ray finned species, with spiny fins, are rare among deep-sea fishes, which suggests that deep-sea fish are ancient and so well adapted to their environment that invasions by more modern fishes have been unsuccessful. The few ray fins that do exist are mainly in the Beryciformes and Lampriformes, which are also ancient forms. Most deep-sea pelagic fishes belong to their own orders, suggesting a long evolution in deep-sea environments. In contrast, deep-water benthic species, are in orders that include many related shallow-water fishes.

Species by pelagic zone
Many species move daily between zones in vertical migrations. In this table they are listed in the middle or deeper zone where they are regularly found.
Zone	Species and species groups include...
Epipelagic	mackerel, requiem and whale sharks; clupeiforms - herring, anchovy; Salmonidae - salmon; atheriniforms - flyingfishes, halfbeaks, sauries; perciforms - jacks, dolphinfish, pomfrets, barracudas, tunas, billfish.
Mesopelagic	Lanternfish, opah, longnose lancetfish, barreleye, ridgehead, sabretooth, stoplight loosejaw, marine hatchetfish
Bathypelagic	Principally bristlemouth and anglerfish. Also fangtooth, viperfish, black swallower, telescopefish, hammerjaw, daggertooth, barracudina, black scabbardfish, bobtail snipe eel, unicorn crestfish, pelican eel, flabby whalefish.
Benthopelagic	Rattail and brotula are particularly abundant.
Benthic	Flatfish, hagfish, eelpout, greeneye eel, stingray, lumpfish, and batfish

Comparative structure of pelagic fishes
	Epipelagic	Mesopelagic	Bathypelagic	deep-sea benthic
muscles		muscular bodies, ossified bones, scales, well developed gills and central nervous systems, and large hearts and kidneys.	poorly developed, flabby	
skeleton		strong, ossified bones	weak, minimal ossification	
scales		yes	none	
nervous systems		well developed	lateral line and olfactory only	
eyes		large and sensitive	small and may not function	variable (well developed to absent)
photophores	absent	common	common	usually absent
gills		well developed		
kidneys		large	small	
heart		large	small	
swim bladder		vertically migratory fish have swim bladders	reduced or absent	variable (well developed to absent)
size			usually under 25 cm	variable, species greater than one meter are not uncommon

== Mesopelagic fish ==
Mesopelagic fish

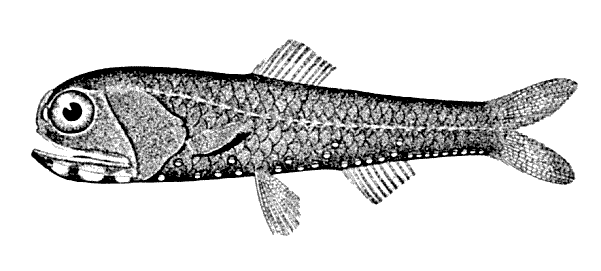
Most mesopelagic fishes are small filter feeders which ascend at night to feed in the nutrient rich waters of the epipelagic zone. During the day, they return to the dark, cold, oxygen deficient waters of the mesopelagic where they are relatively safe from predators. Lanternfish account for as much as 65% of all deep-sea fish biomass and are largely responsible for the deep scattering layer of the world's oceans.

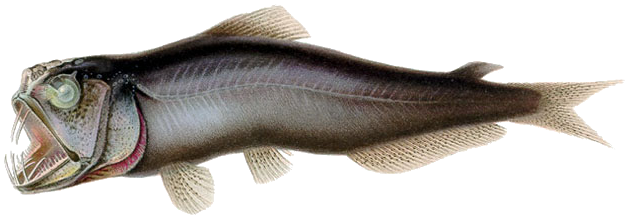
Most of the rest of the mesopelagic fishes are ambush predators, like this sabertooth fish which uses its telescopic, upward-pointing eyes to pick out prey silhouetted against the gloom above. Their recurved teeth prevent a captured fish from backing out.

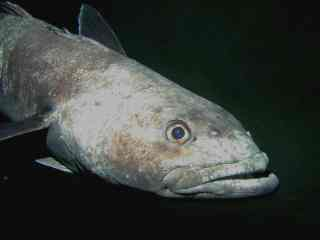
The Antarctic toothfish have large, upward looking eyes, adapted to detecting the silhouettes of prey fish

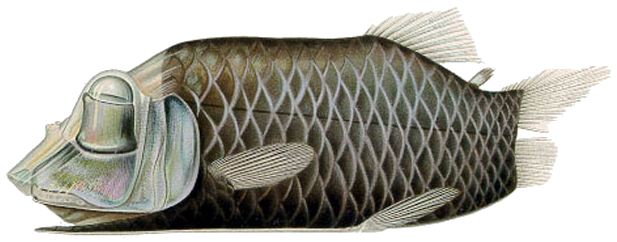
The barreleye has barrel-shaped, tubular eyes which are generally directed upwards but can be swivelled forward

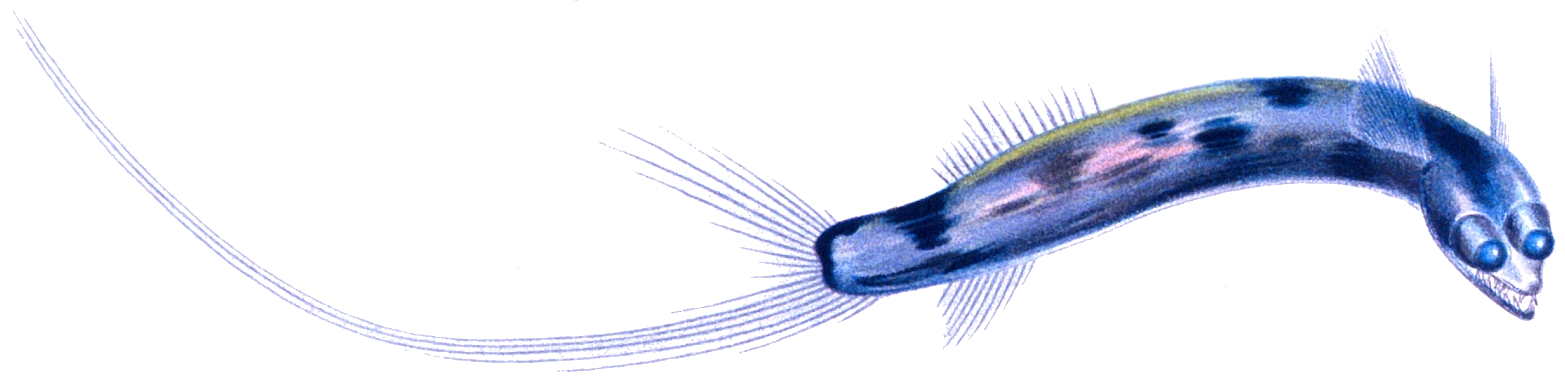
The telescopefish has large, forward-pointing telescoping eyes with large lenses

Below the epipelagic zone, conditions change rapidly. Between 200 m and about 1000 m, light continues to fade until there is almost none. Temperatures fall through a thermocline to temperatures between 3.9 and 7.8 °C (39.0 and 46.0 °F). This is the twilight or mesopelagic zone. Pressure continues to increase, at the rate of one atm (0.1 MPa) every 10 m (33 ft), while nutrient concentrations fall, along with dissolved oxygen and the rate at which the water circulates.

Sonar operators, using the newly developed sonar technology during World War II, were puzzled by what appeared to be a false sea floor 300–500 metres (984–1,640 ft) deep by day, and less deep at night. This turned out to be due to millions of marine organisms, most particularly small mesopelagic fish, with swim bladders that reflected the sonar. These organisms migrate up into shallower water at dusk to feed on plankton. The layer is deeper when the moon is out, and can become shallower when clouds pass over the moon. This phenomenon has come to be known as the deep scattering layer.

Most mesopelagic fish make daily vertical migrations, moving at night into the epipelagic zone, often following similar migrations of zooplankton, and returning to the depths for safety during the day. These vertical migrations often occur over large vertical distances, and are undertaken with the assistance of a swim bladder. The swim bladder is inflated when the fish wants to move up, and, given the high pressures in the messoplegic zone, this requires significant energy. As the fish ascends, the pressure in the swim bladder must adjust to prevent it from bursting. When the fish wants to return to the depths, the swim bladder is deflated. Some mesopelagic fishes make daily migrations through the thermocline, where the temperature changes between 50 and 69 °F (10 and 21 °C), thus displaying considerable tolerances for temperature change.

These fish have muscular bodies, ossified bones, scales, well developed gills and central nervous systems, and large hearts and kidneys. Mesopelagic plankton feeders have small mouths with fine gill rakers, while the piscivores have larger mouths and coarser gill rakers.

Mesopelagic fish are adapted for an active life under low light conditions. Most of them are visual predators with large eyes. Some of the deeper water fish have tubular eyes with big lenses and only rod cells that look upwards. These give binocular vision and great sensitivity to small light signals. This adaptation gives improved terminal vision at the expense of lateral vision, and allows the predator to pick out squid, cuttlefish, and smaller fish that are silhouetted against the gloom above them.

Mesopelagic fish usually lack defensive spines, and use colour to camouflage themselves from other fish. Ambush predators are dark, black or red. Since the longer, red, wavelengths of light do not reach the deep sea, red effectively functions the same as black. Migratory forms use countershaded silvery colours. On their bellies, they often display photophores producing low grade light. For a predator from below, looking upwards, this bioluminescence camouflages the silhouette of the fish. However, some of these predators have yellow lenses that filter the (red deficient) ambient light, leaving the bioluminescence visible.

The brownsnout spookfish, a species of barreleye, is the only vertebrate known to employ a mirror, as opposed to a lens, to focus an image in its eyes.

Sampling by deep trawling indicates that lanternfish account for as much as 65% of all deep-sea fish biomass. Indeed, lanternfish are among the most widely distributed, populous, and diverse of all vertebrates, playing an important ecological role as prey for larger organisms. The estimated global biomass of lanternfish is 550–660 million tonnes, several times the entire world fisheries catch. Lanternfish also account for much of the biomass responsible for the deep scattering layer of the world's oceans.

Bigeye tuna are an epipelagic/mesopelagic species that eats other fish. Satellite tagging has shown that bigeye tuna often spend prolonged periods cruising deep below the surface during the daytime, sometimes making dives as deep as 500 metres (1,640 ft). These movements are thought to be in response to the vertical migrations of prey organisms in the deep scattering layer.

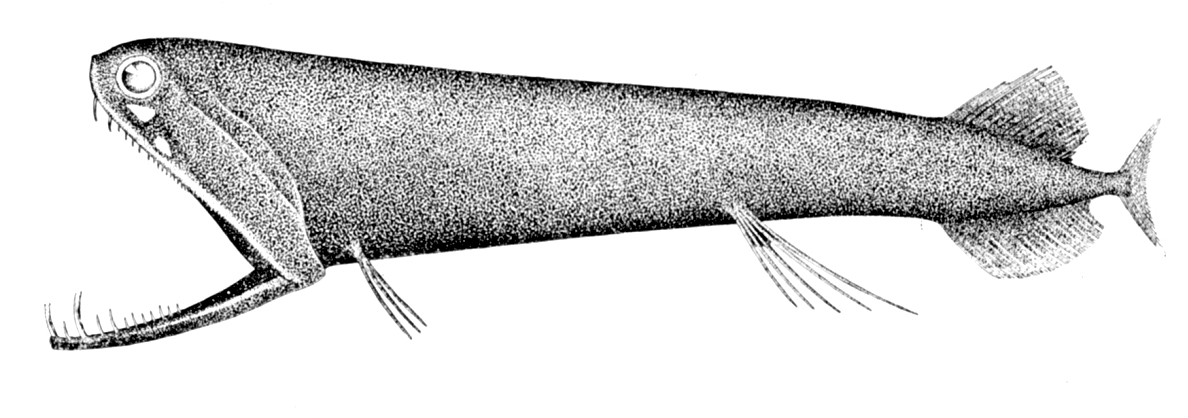
The stoplight loosejaw has a lower jaw one-quarter as long as its body. The jaw has no floor and is attached only by a hinge and a modified tongue bone. Large fang-like teeth in the front are followed by many small barbed teeth.

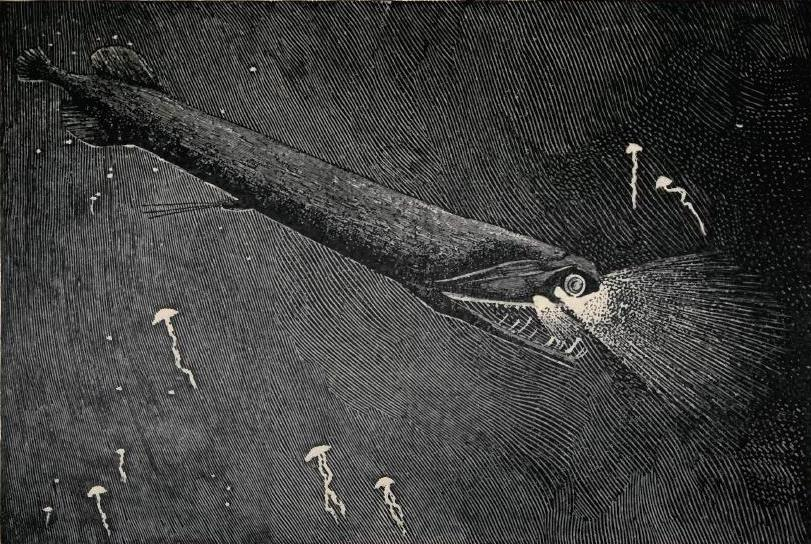
The stoplight loosejaw is also one of the few fishes that produce red bioluminescence. As most of their prey cannot perceive red light, this allows it to hunt with an essentially invisible beam of light.

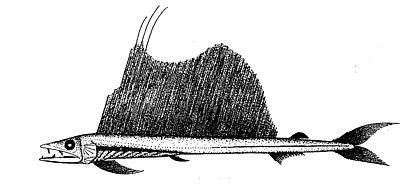
Long-snouted lancetfish. Lancetfish are ambush predators which spend all their time in the mesopelagic zone. They are among the largest mesopelagic fishes (up to 2 m (6.6 ft).

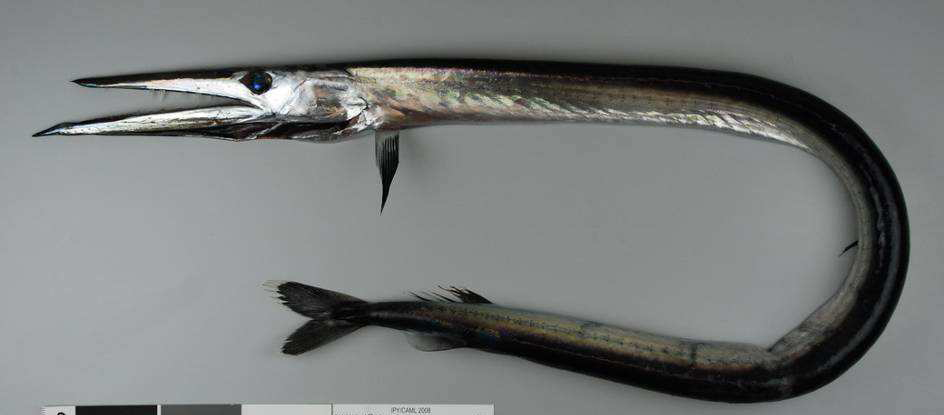
A daggertooth, frequently recovered as mesopelagic bycatch.

== Bathypelagic fish ==
Bathypelagic fish

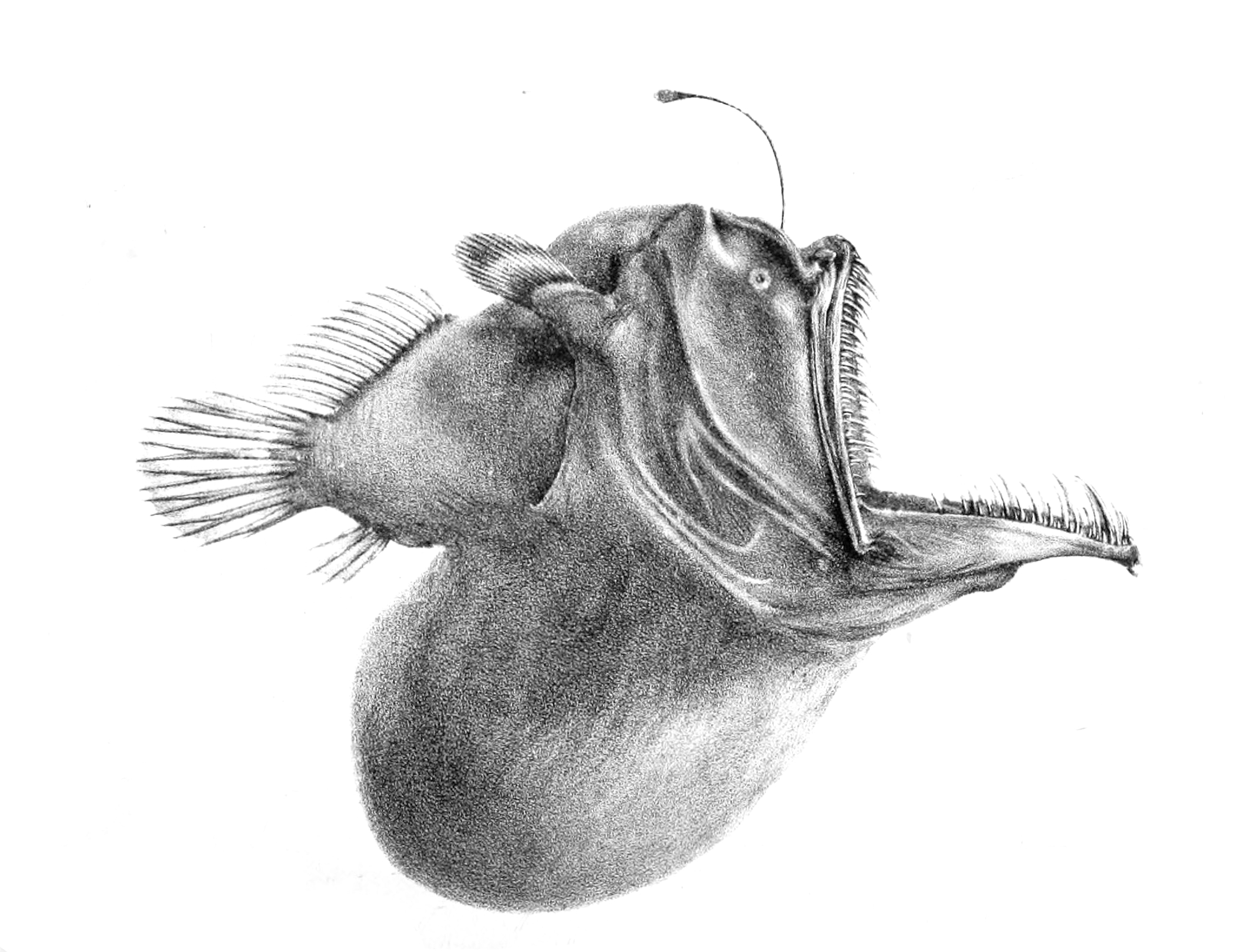
The humpback anglerfish is a bathypelagic ambush predator, which attracts prey with a bioluminescent lure. It can ingest prey larger than itself, which it swallows with an inrush of water when it opens its mouth.

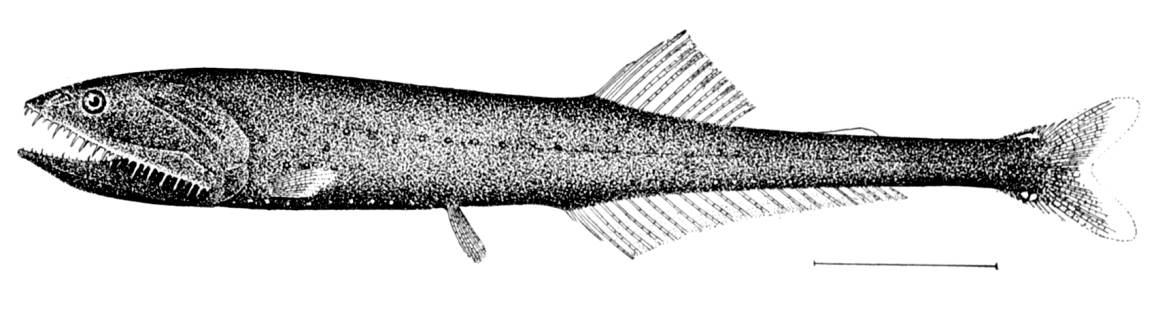
Many bristlemouth species, such as the "spark anglemouth" above, are also bathypelagic ambush predators which can swallow prey larger than themselves. They are among the most abundant of all vertebrate families.

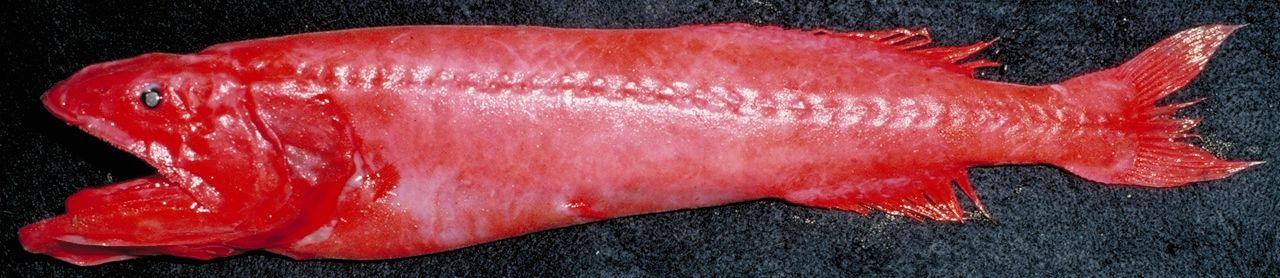
Young, red flabby whalefish make nightly vertical migrations into the lower mesopelagic zone to feed on copepods. When males make the transition to adults, they develop a massive liver, and then their jaws fuse shut. They no longer eat, but continue to metabolise the energy stored in their liver.

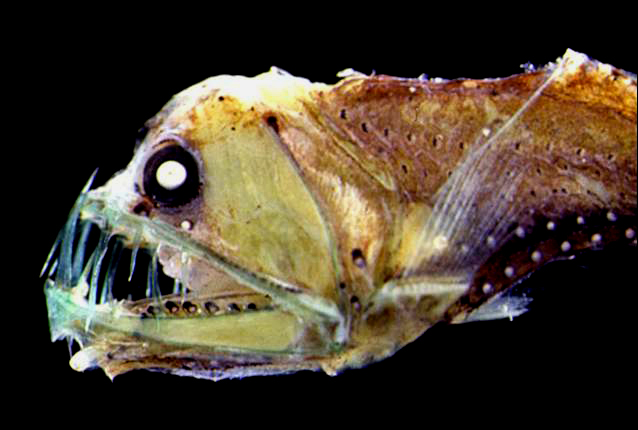
The Sloane's viperfish can make nightly migrations from bathypelagic depths to near surface waters.

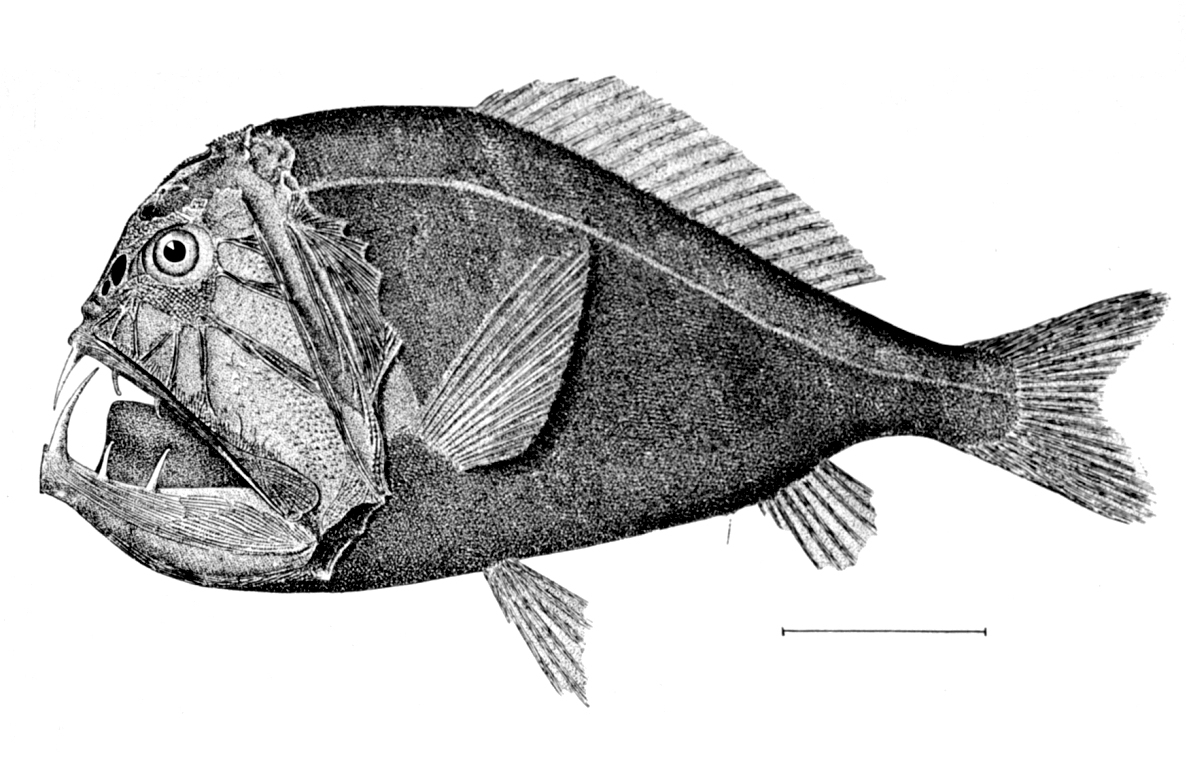
The widespread fangtooth has the largest teeth of any fish, proportionate to body size. Despite their ferocious appearance, bathypelagic fish are usually weakly muscled and too small to represent any threat to humans.

Below the mesopelagic zone it is pitch dark. This is the midnight (or bathypelagic zone), extending from 1,000 metres (3,281 ft) to the bottom deep-water benthic zone. If the water is exceptionally deep, the pelagic zone below 4,000 metres (13,123 ft) is sometimes called the lower midnight (or abyssopelagic zone). Temperatures in this zone range from 1 to 4 °C (34 to 39 °F) and it is completely aphotic.

Conditions are somewhat uniform throughout these zones; the darkness is complete, the pressure is crushing, and temperatures, nutrients and dissolved oxygen levels are all low.

Bathypelagic fish have special adaptations to cope with these conditions – they have slow metabolisms and unspecialized diets, being willing to eat anything that comes along. They prefer to sit and wait for food rather than waste energy searching for it. The behaviour of bathypelagic fish can be contrasted with the behaviour of mesopelagic fish. Mesopelagic fish are often highly mobile, whereas bathypelagic fish are almost all lie-in-wait predators, normally expending little energy in movement.

The dominant bathypelagic fishes are small bristlemouth and anglerfish; fangtooth, viperfish, daggertooth and barracudina are also common. These fishes are small, many about 10 centimetres (3.9 in) long, and not many longer than 25 centimetres (9.8 in). They spend most of their time waiting patiently in the water column for prey to appear or to be lured by their phosphors. What little energy is available in the bathypelagic zone filters from above in the form of detritus, faecal material, and the occasional invertebrate or mesopelagic fish. About 20 percent of the food that has its origins in the epipelagic zone falls down to the mesopelagic zone, but only about 5 percent filters down to the bathypelagic zone.

Bathypelagic fish are sedentary, adapted to outputting minimum energy in a habitat with very little food or available energy, not even sunlight, only bioluminescence. Their bodies are elongated with weak, watery muscles and skeletal structures. Since so much of the fish is water, they are not compressed by the great pressures at these depths. They often have extensible, hinged jaws with recurved teeth. They are slimy, without scales. The central nervous system is confined to the lateral line and olfactory systems, the eyes are small and may not function, and gills, kidneys and hearts, and swim bladders are small or missing. These are the same features found in fish larvae, which suggests that during their evolution, bathypelagic fish have acquired these features through neoteny. As with larvae, these features allow the fish to remain suspended in the water with little expenditure of energy.

Despite their ferocious appearance, these forms are mostly miniature fish with weak muscles, and are too small to represent any threat to humans. An exception to the generally small size of bathypelagic fish is the Yokozuna slickhead (Narcetes shonanmaruae), described in 2021, which is the largest known entirely bathypelagic bony fish at over 2.5 metres (8.2 ft) in length.

The swim bladders of deep-sea fish are either absent or scarcely operational, and bathypelagic fish do not normally undertake vertical migrations. Filling bladders at such great pressures incurs huge energy costs. Some deep-sea fishes have swim bladders which function while they are young and inhabit the upper epipelagic zone, but they wither or fill with fat when the fish move down to their adult habitat.

A couple of known exceptions are the cusk-eel (Holcomycteronus profundissimus), retrieved from 7160 meters deep, and the rough abyssal grenadier (Coryphaenoides yaquinae), found at 7259 meters depth. These species still have functional swim bladders, which allows them to maintain high bone density and strong jaws.

The most important sensory systems are usually the inner ear, which responds to sound, and the lateral line, which responds to changes in water pressure. The olfactory system can also be important for males who find females by smell. Bathypelagic fish are black, or sometimes red, with few photophores. When photophores are used, it is usually to entice prey or attract a mate. Because food is so scarce, bathypelagic predators are not selective in their feeding habits, but grab whatever comes close enough. They accomplish this by having a large mouth with sharp teeth for grabbing large prey and overlapping gill rakers which prevent small prey that have been swallowed from escaping.

It is not easy finding a mate in this zone. Some species depend on bioluminescence, where bioluminescent patterns are unique to specific species. Others are hermaphrodites, which doubles their chances of producing both eggs and sperm when an encounter occurs. The female anglerfish releases pheromones to attract tiny males. When a male finds her, he bites on to her and never lets go. When a male of the anglerfish species Haplophryne mollis bites into the skin of a female, he releases an enzyme that digests the skin of his mouth and her body, fusing the pair to the point where the two circulatory systems join up. The male then atrophies into nothing more than a pair of gonads. This extreme sexual dimorphism ensures that, when the female is ready to spawn, she has a mate immediately available.

Many forms other than fish live in the bathypelagic zone, such as squid, large whales, octopuses, sponges, brachiopods, sea stars, and echinoids, but this zone is difficult for fish to live in.

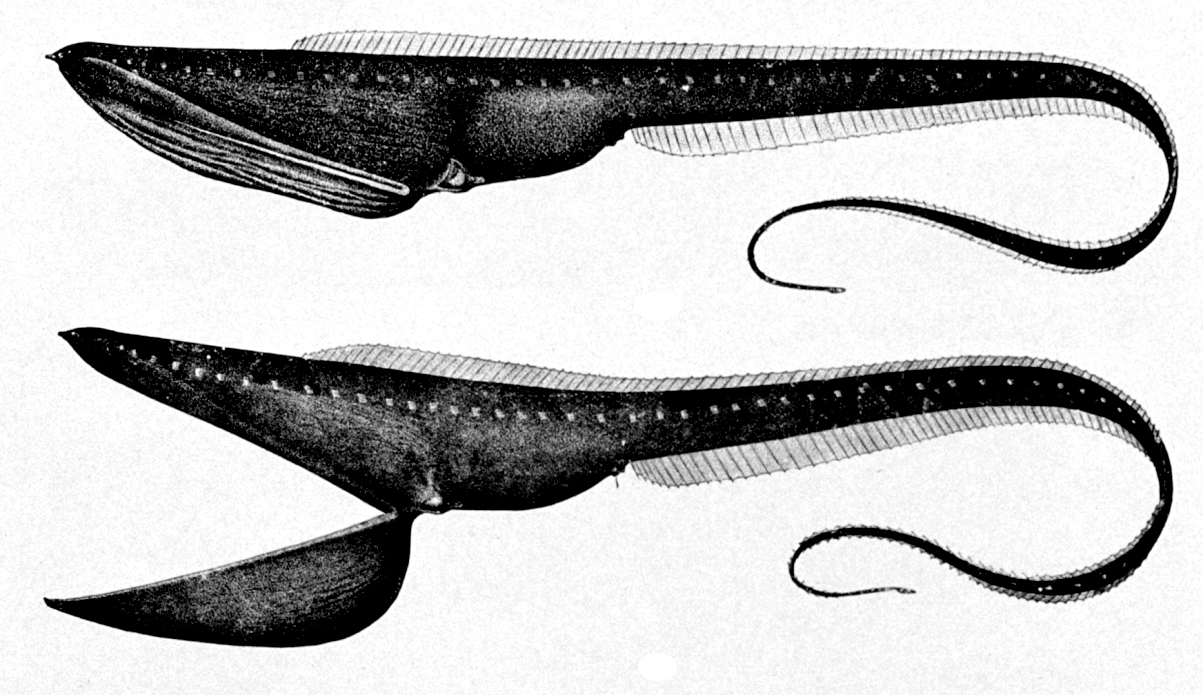
The pelican eel uses its large mouth like a net by opening its jaws and swimming towards prey. It has a luminescent organ at the tip of its tail to attract prey.

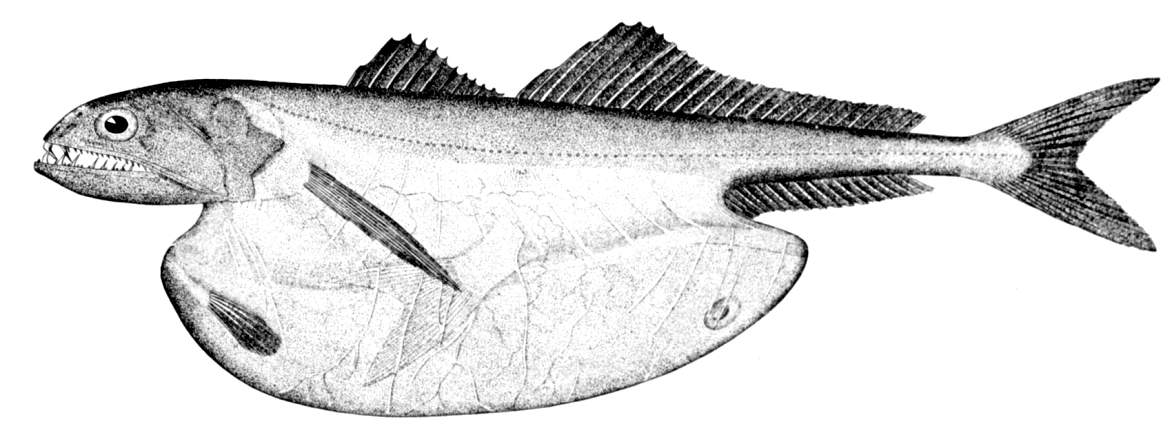
The black swallower, with its distensible stomach, is notable for its ability to swallow, whole, bony fishes ten times its mass.

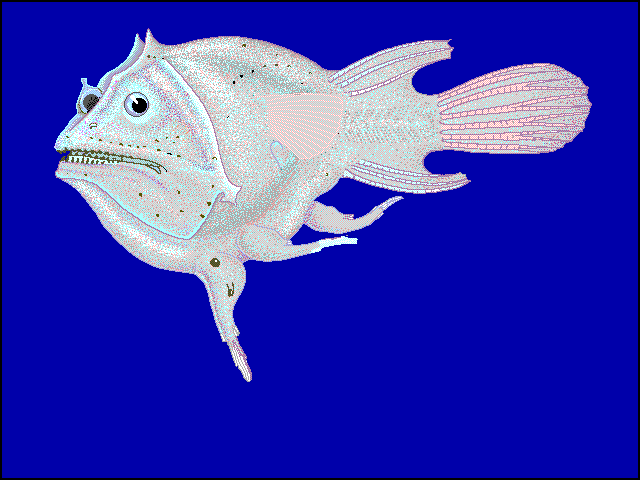
Female Haplophryne mollis anglerfish trailing attached males which have atrophied into a pair of gonads, for use when the female is ready to spawn.

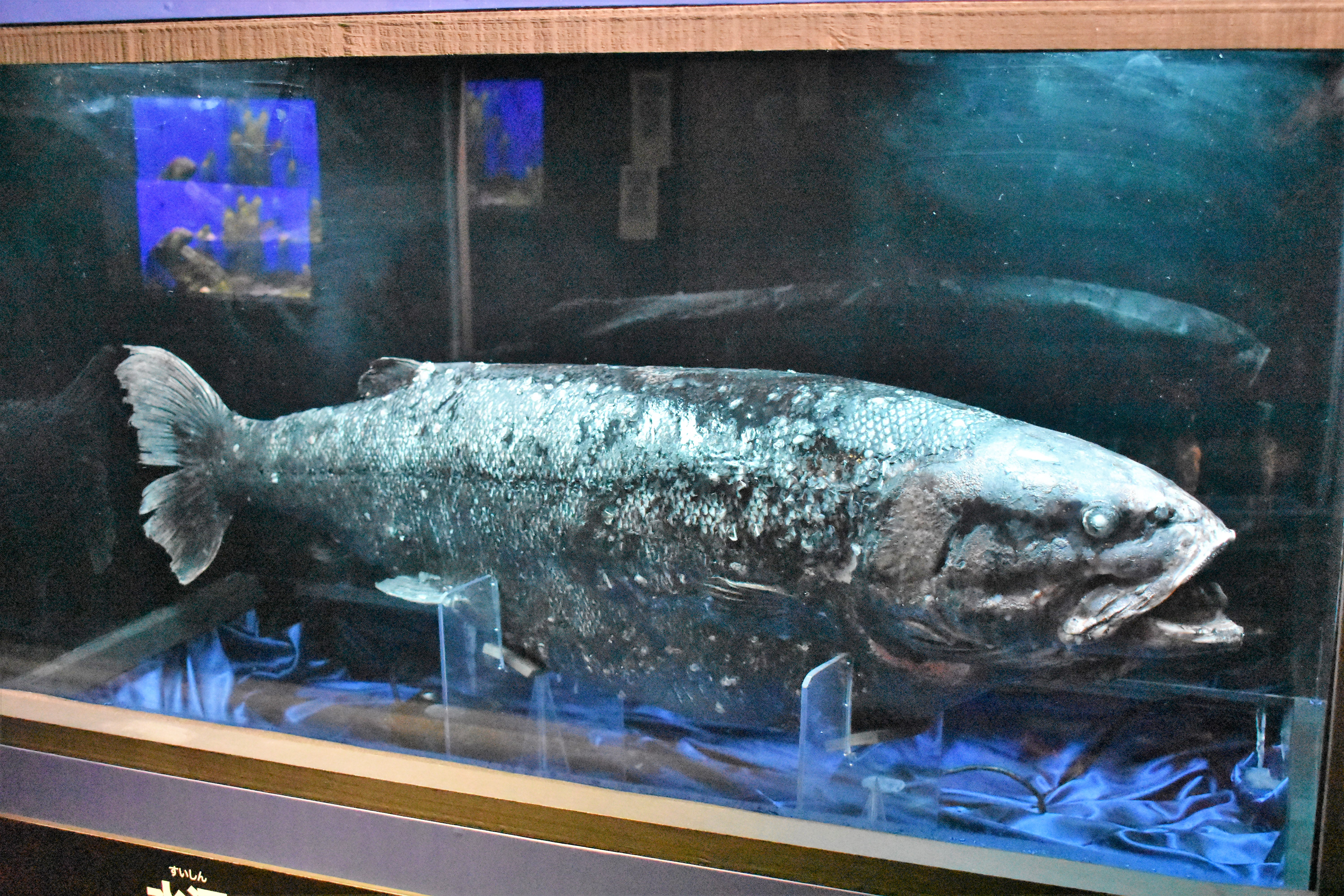
The Yokozuna slickhead is the largest known bathypelagic bony fish, at over 250 centimeters (8.2 ft) in length.

== Adaptation to high pressure ==
As a fish moves deeper into the sea, the weight of the water overhead exerts increasing hydrostatic pressure on the fish. This increased pressure amounts to about one atm (0.1 MPa) for every 10 m (33 ft)in depth. For a fish at the bottom of the bathypelagic zone, this pressure amounts to about 400 atm (40 MPa, 6000 psi).

Deep-sea organisms possess adaptations at cellular and physiological levels that allow them to survive in environments of great pressure. Not having these adaptations limits the depths at which shallow-water species can operate. High levels of external pressure affects how metabolic processes and biochemical reactions proceed. The equilibrium of many chemical reactions is disturbed by pressure, and pressure can inhibit processes which result in an increase in volume. Water, a key component in many biological processes, is very susceptible to volume changes, mainly because constituents of cellular fluid have an effect on water structure. Thus, enzymatic reactions that induce changes in water organization effectively change the system's volume. Proteins responsible for catalyzing reactions are typically held together by weak bonds and the reactions usually involve volume increases.

Species that can tolerate these depths have evolved changes in their protein structure and reaction criteria to withstand pressure, in order to perform reactions in these conditions. In high pressure environments, bilayer cellular membranes experience a loss of fluidity. Deep-sea cellular membranes favor phospholipid bilayers with a higher proportion of unsaturated fatty acids, which induce a higher fluidity than their sea-level counterparts.

Ten orders, thirteen families and about 200 known species of deep-sea fish have evolved a gelatinous layer below the skin or around the spine, which is used for buoyancy, low-cost growth and to increase swimming efficiency by reducing drag.

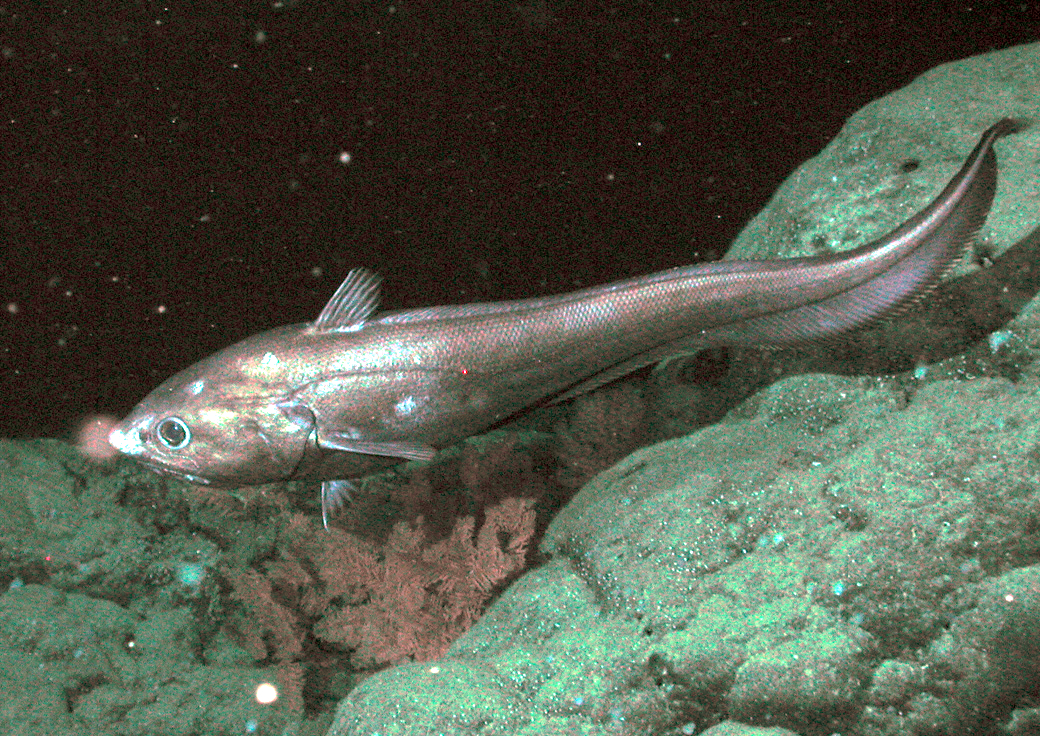
The rattail Coryphaenoides armatus (abyssal grenadier) on the Davidson Seamount at a depth of 2,253 metres (7,392 ft).

Deep-sea species exhibit lower changes of entropy and enthalpy compared to surface level organisms, since a high pressure and low temperature environment favors negative enthalpy changes and reduced dependence on entropy-driven reactions. From a structural standpoint, globular proteins of deep-sea fish due to the tertiary structure of G-actin are relatively rigid compared to those of surface level fish. The fact that proteins in deep-sea fish are structurally different from surface fish is apparent from the observation that actin from the muscle fibers of deep-sea fish are extremely heat-resistant; an observation similar to what is found in lizards. These proteins are structurally strengthened by modification of the bonds in the tertiary structure of the protein which also happens to induce high levels of thermal stability. Proteins are structurally strengthened to resist pressure by modification of bonds in the tertiary structure. Therefore, high levels of hydrostatic pressure, similar to high body temperatures of thermophilic desert reptiles, favor rigid protein structures.

Na+/K+ -ATPase is a lipoprotein enzyme that plays a prominent role in osmoregulation and is heavily influenced by hydrostatic pressure. The inhibition of Na+/K+ -ATPase is due to increased compression due to pressure. The rate-limiting step of the Na+/K+ -ATPase reaction induces an expansion in the bilayer surrounding the protein, and therefore an increase in volume. An increase in volume makes Na+/K+ -ATPase reactivity susceptible to higher pressures. Even though the Na+/K+ -ATPase activity per gram of gill tissue is lower for deep-sea fishes, the Na+/K+ -ATPases of deep-sea fishes exhibit a much higher tolerance of hydrostatic pressure compared to their shallow-water counterparts. This is exemplified between the species C. acrolepis (around 2000 m deep) and its hadalpelagic counterpart C. armatus (around 4,000 metres (13,123 ft) deep), where the Na+/K+ -ATPases of C. armatus are much less sensitive to pressure. This resistance to pressure can be explained by adaptations in the protein and lipid moieties of Na+/K+ -ATPase.

== Lanternfish ==
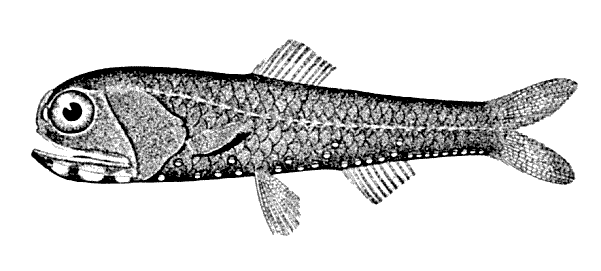
Lantern fish

Sampling via deep trawling indicates that lanternfish account for as much as 65% of all deep-sea fish biomass. Indeed, lanternfish are among the most widely distributed, populous, and diverse of all vertebrates, playing an important ecological role as prey for larger organisms. With an estimated global biomass of 550–660 million metric tons, several times the entire world fisheries catch, lanternfish also account for much of the biomass responsible for the deep scattering layer of the world's oceans. In the Southern Ocean, Myctophids provide an alternative food resource to krill for predators such as squid and the king penguin. Although these fish are plentiful and prolific, currently only a few commercial lanternfish fisheries exist: these include limited operations off South Africa, in the sub-Antarctic, and in the Gulf of Oman.

== Endangered species ==
A 2006 study by Canadian scientists has found five species of deep-sea fish – blue hake, spiny eel – to be on the verge of extinction due to the shift of commercial fishing from continental shelves to the slopes of the continental shelves, down to depths of 1,600 metres (5,249 ft). The slow reproduction of these fish – they reach sexual maturity at about the same age as human beings – is one of the main reasons that they cannot recover from the excessive fishing.

== See also ==
- Census of Marine Life
- Deep ocean water
- Deep sea
- Deep-sea community
- Demersal fish
- Pelagic fish
