= Praepristus rugifoveatus =

Scientific classification
- Kingdom: Animalia
- Phylum: Arthropoda
- Class: Insecta
- Order: Coleoptera
- Suborder: Adephaga
- Family: Carabidae
- Subfamily: Platyninae
- Tribe: Platynini
- Subtribe: Platynina
- Genus: Praepristus
- Species: P. rugifoveatus

Binomial name
- Praepristus rugifoveatus (Louwerens, 1955)

Synonyms
- Notagonum rugifoveatum

Species of beetle

Praepristus rugifoveatus is a species in the beetle family Carabidae. It is found in Indonesia and Borneo.
