= Neocolpodes subimpressus =

Scientific classification
- Domain: Eukaryota
- Kingdom: Animalia
- Phylum: Arthropoda
- Class: Insecta
- Order: Coleoptera
- Suborder: Adephaga
- Family: Carabidae
- Subfamily: Platyninae
- Tribe: Platynini
- Subtribe: Platynina
- Genus: Neocolpodes
- Species: N. subimpressus

Binomial name
- Neocolpodes subimpressus (Alluaud, 1897)

Species of beetle

Neocolpodes subimpressus is a species in the beetle family Carabidae. It is found in Madagascar.
