= Stenolepta =

Scientific classification
- Domain: Eukaryota
- Kingdom: Animalia
- Phylum: Arthropoda
- Class: Insecta
- Order: Coleoptera
- Suborder: Adephaga
- Family: Carabidae
- Subfamily: Platyninae
- Tribe: Sphodrini
- Subtribe: Sphodrina
- Genus: Stenolepta; Semenov, 1889

Genus of beetles

Stenolepta is a genus of ground beetles in the family Carabidae. There are at least three described species in Stenolepta.

== Species ==
These three species belong to the genus Stenolepta:

- Stenolepta cylindrica Semenov, 1889 (Kazakhstan and Uzbekistan)
- Stenolepta gobettii Casale, 1988 (Afghanistan)
- Stenolepta transcaspica Semenov, 1889 (Iran and Turkmenistan)
