= Pseudomyas =

Scientific classification
- Kingdom: Animalia
- Phylum: Arthropoda
- Class: Insecta
- Order: Coleoptera
- Suborder: Adephaga
- Family: Carabidae
- Subfamily: Platyninae
- Tribe: Sphodrini
- Subtribe: Atranopsina
- Genus: Pseudomyas; Uyttenboogaart, 1929
- Species: P. doramasensis

Binomial name
- Pseudomyas doramasensis Uyttenboogaart, 1929

Genus of beetles

Pseudomyas is a genus of ground beetles belonging to the Carabidae family. This genus has a single species, Pseudomyas doramasensis. It is found in the Canary Islands.
