= Pristosia =

Scientific classification
- Kingdom: Animalia
- Phylum: Arthropoda
- Class: Insecta
- Order: Coleoptera
- Suborder: Adephaga
- Family: Carabidae
- Subfamily: Platyninae
- Tribe: Sphodrini
- Subtribe: Pristosiina
- Genus: Pristosia; Motschulsky, 1865

Subgenera
- Apopristosia Lassalle, 2010; Boreopristosia Lassalle, 2010; Eucalathus Bates, 1883; Laemostenopsis Jedlicka, 1931; Paradolichus Semenov, 1889; Pristosia Motschulsky, 1865

Genus of beetles

Pristosia is a genus of ground beetles in the family Carabidae. There are more than 100 described species in Pristosia, found in southern and eastern Asia.

== Species ==
These 101 species belong to Pristosia.

- Pristosia abaensis Lassalle, 2013 (China)
- Pristosia acalathusoides Lassalle, 2013 (China)
- Pristosia acraea (Andrewes, 1934) (India)
- Pristosia aeneocuprea (Fairmaire, 1886) (China)
- Pristosia aeneola (Bates, 1873) (Japan)
- Pristosia aereipennis (Andrewes, 1934) (India)
- Pristosia alesi (Jedlicka, 1937) (China)
- Pristosia amaroides (Putzeys, 1877) (Bhutan, India, and Nepal)
- Pristosia aquilo (Andrewes, 1934) (India)
- Pristosia atrema (Andrewes, 1926) (India)
- Pristosia bastai Lassalle, 2013 (China)
- Pristosia braccata (Andrewes, 1934) (India)
- Pristosia brancuccii Deuve & Lassalle&Queinnec, 1985 (India)
- Pristosia bulirschi Lassalle, 2010 (China)
- Pristosia chambae (Andrewes, 1934) (India)
- Pristosia championi (Andrewes, 1934) (India)
- Pristosia chinensis (Jedlicka, 1933) (China)
- Pristosia chlorodes (Andrewes, 1934) (India and Myanmar)
- Pristosia clara (Andrewes, 1924) (India)
- Pristosia colasi Lassalle, 2013 (China)
- Pristosia crenata (Putzeys, 1873) (China, India, Myanmar, and Nepal)
- Pristosia cupreata (Jedlicka, 1940) (Taiwan and temperate Asia)
- Pristosia dahud Morvan, 1994 (Nepal)
- Pristosia delavayi (Fairmaire, 1887) (China)
- Pristosia deqenensis Lassalle, 2010 (China)
- Pristosia dodensis Deuve & Lassalle&Queinnec, 1985 (India)
- Pristosia dongziensis Lassalle, 2013 (China)
- Pristosia elevata Lindroth, 1956 (China)
- Pristosia falsicolor (Fairmaire, 1886) (China)
- Pristosia flava (Andrewes, 1934) (India)
- Pristosia glabella J.Schmidt & Hartmann, 2009 (Nepal)
- Pristosia glacialis (Andrewes, 1934) (India)
- Pristosia hauseri (Jedlicka, 1931) (China)
- Pristosia heinzi F.Battoni, 1984 (Pakistan)
- Pristosia heyrovskyi (Jedlicka, 1932) (China)
- Pristosia hweisiensis (Jedlicka, 1937) (China)
- Pristosia illustris (Andrewes, 1947) (Myanmar)
- Pristosia impunctata Sasakawa, Kim & Kim&Kubota, 2006 (South Korea)
- Pristosia jedlickai Hovorka & Sciaky, 2003 (China)
- Pristosia jureceki (Jedlicka, 1931) (China)
- Pristosia lacerans (Bates, 1889) (India)
- Pristosia lateritia (Fairmaire, 1886) (China)
- Pristosia lateritioides Lassalle, 2010 (China)
- Pristosia latistoma Sasakawa, Kim & Kim&Kubota, 2006 (South Korea)
- Pristosia ledouxi Deuve & Lassalle&Queinnec, 1985 (India)
- Pristosia leptodes (Andrewes, 1934) (India)
- Pristosia leurops (Andrewes, 1934) (India)
- Pristosia litangensis Lassalle, 2010 (China)
- Pristosia macra (Andrewes, 1934) (India)
- Pristosia magna Lassalle, 2010 (China)
- Pristosia maoniushanensis Lassalle, 2010 (China)
- Pristosia maoxianensis Lassalle, 2010 (China)
- Pristosia meiliensis Lassalle, 2013 (China)
- Pristosia meridionalis Lassalle, 2010 (China)
- Pristosia minutalis (Andrewes, 1934) (India)
- Pristosia miwai (Jedlicka, 1940) (Taiwan and temperate Asia)
- Pristosia morvani Lassalle, 2013 (China)
- Pristosia nanpingicus Lassalle, 2010 (China)
- Pristosia nepalensis J.Schmidt & Hartmann, 2009 (Nepal)
- Pristosia nitidula (A.Morawitz, 1862) (China, Mongolia, and Russia)
- Pristosia nitouensis (Jedlicka, 1937) (China)
- Pristosia nubilipenissoides Lassalle, 2013 (China)
- Pristosia nubilipennis (Fairmaire, 1889) (China)
- Pristosia oblonga Lassalle, 2010 (China)
- Pristosia opaca Lassalle, 2010 (China)
- Pristosia picea Motschulsky, 1865 (India)
- Pristosia picescens (Fairmaire, 1887) (China)
- Pristosia pingwuensis Lassalle, 2013 (China)
- Pristosia potanini (Semenov, 1889) (China)
- Pristosia prenta (Jedlicka, 1937) (China)
- Pristosia proxima (A.Morawitz, 1862) (China, North Korea, Russia, and South Korea)
- Pristosia przewalskii (Semenov, 1889) (China)
- Pristosia purkynei (Jedlicka, 1931) (China)
- Pristosia purpurea Lassalle, 2010 (China)
- Pristosia qiaojiacensis Lassalle, 2013 (China)
- Pristosia quadricolor (Andrewes, 1934) (India)
- Pristosia reitteri (Jedlicka, 1937) (China)
- Pristosia schnelli Lassalle, 2010 (China)
- Pristosia sciakyi Lassalle, 2010 (China)
- Pristosia sienla (Jedlicka, 1937) (China)
- Pristosia silvanoi F.Battoni, 1982 (Pakistan)
- Pristosia similata J.Schmidt & Hartmann, 2009 (Nepal)
- Pristosia sterbai (Jedlicka, 1937) (China)
- Pristosia striata Lassalle, 2010 (China)
- Pristosia strigipennis (Fairmaire, 1889) (China)
- Pristosia suensoni Lindroth, 1956 (China)
- Pristosia sulcipennis (Fairmaire, 1889) (China)
- Pristosia szekessyi (Jedlicka, 1960) (China)
- Pristosia szetschuana (Jedlicka, 1932) (China)
- Pristosia taibaishanensis Lassalle, 2013 (China)
- Pristosia tenuistriata (Fairmaire, 1889) (China)
- Pristosia thilliezi Lassalle, 2013 (China)
- Pristosia tibetana (Andrewes, 1934) (China)
- Pristosia vigil (Tschitscherine, 1895) (North Korea and Russia)
- Pristosia viridis (Jedlicka, 1940) (Taiwan and temperate Asia)
- Pristosia wenxianensis Lassalle, 2010 (China)
- Pristosia wrasei Lassalle, 2013 (China)
- Pristosia wrzecionkoi Lassalle, 2010 (China)
- Pristosia xanthopus (Andrewes, 1934) (Pakistan)
- Pristosia yunnana (Jedlicka, 1931) (China)
- Pristosia zheduoensis Lassalle, 2013 (China)
