= Thermoscelis =

Scientific classification
- Domain: Eukaryota
- Kingdom: Animalia
- Phylum: Arthropoda
- Class: Insecta
- Order: Coleoptera
- Suborder: Adephaga
- Family: Carabidae
- Subfamily: Platyninae
- Tribe: Sphodrini
- Subtribe: Calathina
- Genus: Thermoscelis; Putzeys, 1873
- Species: T. insignis

Binomial name
- Thermoscelis insignis (Chaudoir, 1846)

Genus of beetles

Thermoscelis is a genus of ground beetles in the family Carabidae. This genus has a single species, Thermoscelis insignis. It is found in the countries Georgia, Russia, and Turkey.
