= Pristosia atrema =

Scientific classification
- Domain: Eukaryota
- Kingdom: Animalia
- Phylum: Arthropoda
- Class: Insecta
- Order: Coleoptera
- Suborder: Adephaga
- Family: Carabidae
- Genus: Pristosia
- Species: P. atrema

Binomial name
- Pristosia atrema (Andrewes, 1926)

Species of beetle

Pristosia atrema is a species of ground beetle in the Platyninae subfamily that is endemic to India, and can be found in such provinces as Uttar Pradesh and Uttarakhand.
