= Cephalosdrophus =

Scientific classification
- Domain: Eukaryota
- Kingdom: Animalia
- Phylum: Arthropoda
- Class: Insecta
- Order: Coleoptera
- Suborder: Adephaga
- Family: Carabidae
- Subfamily: Platyninae
- Tribe: Sphodrini
- Subtribe: Sphodrina
- Genus: Cephalosdrophus; Lassalle & Marcilhac, 1999
- Species: C. marinae

Binomial name
- Cephalosdrophus marinae (Lassalle & Marcilhac, 1999)

Genus of beetles

Cephalosdrophus is a genus of ground beetles in the family Carabidae. This genus has a single species, Cephalosdrophus marinae. It is found in China.
