= Parabroscus =

Scientific classification
- Domain: Eukaryota
- Kingdom: Animalia
- Phylum: Arthropoda
- Class: Insecta
- Order: Coleoptera
- Suborder: Adephaga
- Family: Carabidae
- Subfamily: Platyninae
- Tribe: Sphodrini
- Subtribe: Synuchina
- Genus: Parabroscus; Lindroth, 1956

Subgenera
- Parabroscoides Habu, 1978; Parabroscus Lindroth, 1956

Genus of beetles

Parabroscus is a genus of ground beetles in the family Carabidae. There are at least two described species in Parabroscus.

== Species ==
These two species belong to the genus Parabroscus:

- Parabroscus crassipalpis (Bates, 1873) (Japan)
- Parabroscus teradai Habu, 1978 (Taiwan and temperate Asia)
