= Eremosphodrus =

Scientific classification
- Domain: Eukaryota
- Kingdom: Animalia
- Phylum: Arthropoda
- Class: Insecta
- Order: Coleoptera
- Suborder: Adephaga
- Family: Carabidae
- Subfamily: Platyninae
- Tribe: Sphodrini
- Subtribe: Sphodrina
- Genus: Eremosphodrus; Semenov, 1909

Genus of beetles

Eremosphodrus is a genus of ground beetles in the family Carabidae. There are at least two described species in Eremosphodrus.

== Species ==
These two species belong to the genus Eremosphodrus:

- Eremosphodrus dvorshaki Casale & Vereschagina, 1986 (Kazakhstan, Tadzhikistan, Turkmenistan, and Uzbekistan)
- Eremosphodrus rotundicollis (Reitter, 1894) (Afghanistan, Tadzhikistan, Turkmenistan, and Uzbekistan)
