= Pseudoplatyderus =

Scientific classification
- Domain: Eukaryota
- Kingdom: Animalia
- Phylum: Arthropoda
- Class: Insecta
- Order: Coleoptera
- Suborder: Adephaga
- Family: Carabidae
- Subfamily: Platyninae
- Tribe: Sphodrini
- Subtribe: Atranopsina
- Genus: Pseudoplatyderus; Bolivar y Pieltain, 1940
- Species: P. amblyops

Binomial name
- Pseudoplatyderus amblyops Bolivar y Pieltain, 1940

Genus of beetles

Pseudoplatyderus is a genus of ground beetles in the family Carabidae. This genus has a single species, Pseudoplatyderus amblyops. It is found in the Canary Islands.
