= Acalathus =

Scientific classification
- Domain: Eukaryota
- Kingdom: Animalia
- Phylum: Arthropoda
- Class: Insecta
- Order: Coleoptera
- Suborder: Adephaga
- Family: Carabidae
- Subfamily: Platyninae
- Tribe: Sphodrini
- Subtribe: Dolichina
- Genus: Acalathus; Semenov, 1889

Subgenera
- Acalathus Semenov, 1889; Procalathus Jedlicka, 1953

Genus of beetles

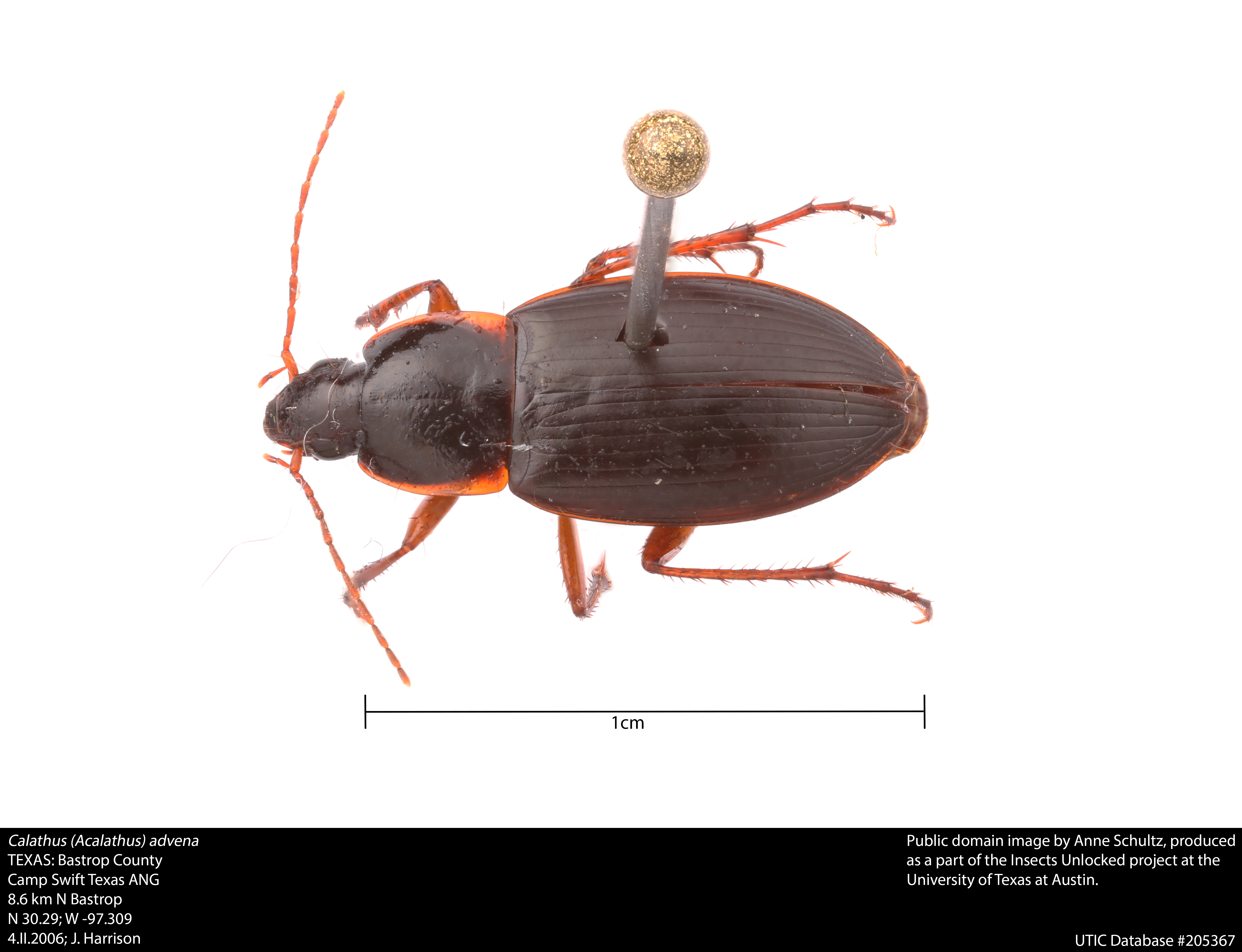

Acalathus is a genus of ground beetles in the family Carabidae. There are about 13 described species in Acalathus, found in China.

== Species ==
These 13 species belong to the genus Acalathus:

- Acalathus businskyi (Lassalle, 1999)
- Acalathus drolmae Lassalle, 1999
- Acalathus fallax (Semenov, 1889)
- Acalathus kangdingensis Lassalle, 2011
- Acalathus langmusiensis (Lassalle, 1999)
- Acalathus luhuoensis Lassalle, 1999
- Acalathus nanpingensis (Lassalle, 1999)
- Acalathus semirufescens Semenov, 1889
- Acalathus shaanxiensis (Lassalle, 2011)
- Acalathus validulus Tschitscherine, 1896
- Acalathus wrzecionkoi Lassalle, 1999
- Acalathus xiahensis Lassalle, 1999
- Acalathus yunnanicus (Lassalle, 2011)
