= Taphoxenus =

- Taphoxenus goliath

Scientific classification
- Kingdom: Animalia
- Phylum: Arthropoda
- Clade: Pancrustacea
- Class: Insecta
- Order: Coleoptera
- Suborder: Adephaga
- Family: Carabidae
- Subfamily: Platyninae
- Tribe: Sphodrini
- Subtribe: Sphodrina
- Genus: Taphoxenus; Motschulsky, 1850

Subgenera
- Lychnifugus Motschulsky, 1865; Taphoxenus Motschulsky, 1850

Genus of beetles

Taphoxenus is a genus of ground beetles in the family Carabidae. There are about 14 described species in Taphoxenus.

== Species ==
These 14 species belong to the genus Taphoxenus:

- Taphoxenus alatavicus Semenov, 1908 (Kazakhstan and Kyrgyzstan)
- Taphoxenus cellarum (M.Adams, 1817) (worldwide)
- Taphoxenus cerberus (Ganglbauer, 1905) (Turkey)
- Taphoxenus elburzensis Casale & Wrase, 2018 (Iran)
- Taphoxenus gigas (Fischer von Waldheim, 1823) (worldwide)
- Taphoxenus goliath (Faldermann, 1836) (worldwide)
- Taphoxenus hauserianus Casale, 1988 (China)
- Taphoxenus meridionalis Casale, 1982 (Iraq and Syria)
- Taphoxenus murzini Casale & Wrase, 2018 (Iran)
- Taphoxenus persicus Jedlicka, 1952 (Iran)
- Taphoxenus pseudogracilis Vereschagina, 1987
- Taphoxenus transmontanus Semenov, 1908 (China and Kyrgyzstan)
- Taphoxenus trochanteratus Emden, 1954 (Afghanistan)
- Taphoxenus ziegleri Casale & Assmann, 2017 (Jordan)
