= Himalosphodrus =

Scientific classification
- Domain: Eukaryota
- Kingdom: Animalia
- Phylum: Arthropoda
- Class: Insecta
- Order: Coleoptera
- Suborder: Adephaga
- Family: Carabidae
- Subfamily: Platyninae
- Tribe: Sphodrini
- Subtribe: Sphodrina
- Genus: Himalosphodrus; Casale, 1988
- Species: H. cnesipus

Binomial name
- Himalosphodrus cnesipus (Andrewes, 1937)

Genus of beetles

Himalosphodrus is a genus of ground beetles in the family Carabidae. This genus has a single species, Himalosphodrus cnesipus. It is found in India.
