= Atranopsis =

Scientific classification
- Domain: Eukaryota
- Kingdom: Animalia
- Phylum: Arthropoda
- Class: Insecta
- Order: Coleoptera
- Suborder: Adephaga
- Family: Carabidae
- Subfamily: Platyninae
- Tribe: Sphodrini
- Subtribe: Atranopsina
- Genus: Atranopsis; Baehr, 1982

Genus of beetles

Atranopsis is a genus of ground beetles in the family Carabidae. There are at least two described species in Atranopsis.

== Species ==
These two species belong to the genus Atranopsis:

- Atranopsis bolognai (Casale & Vigna Taglianti, 1984) (Turkey)
- Atranopsis scheuerni Baehr, 1982 (Syria)
