= Xestopus =

Scientific classification
- Kingdom: Animalia
- Phylum: Arthropoda
- Class: Insecta
- Order: Coleoptera
- Suborder: Adephaga
- Family: Carabidae
- Subfamily: Platyninae
- Tribe: Sphodrini
- Subtribe: Dolichina
- Genus: Xestopus; Andrewes, 1937

Type species
- Pristonychus alticola Fairmaire, 1889

Synonyms
- Nepalocalathus Habu, 1973; Wittmerosphodrus Morvan, 1978

Genus of beetles

Xestopus is a genus of ground beetles in the family Carabidae. There are about eight described species in Xestopus.

== Species ==
These eight species belong to the genus Xestopus:

- Xestopus alticola (Fairmaire, 1889) (China, India, and Myanmar)
- Xestopus bhutanensis (Morvan, 1979) (Bhutan)
- Xestopus cordicollis (Morvan, 1979) (Bhutan)
- Xestopus cyaneus Sciaky & Facchini, 1997 (China)
- Xestopus gutangensis Zhu & Kavanaugh, 2021 (China)
- Xestopus kumatai (Habu, 1973) (Nepal)
- Xestopus nepalensis Morvan, 1982 (Nepal)
- Xestopus walteri (Morvan, 1978) (Bhutan)
