= Calathidius =

Scientific classification
- Domain: Eukaryota
- Kingdom: Animalia
- Phylum: Arthropoda
- Class: Insecta
- Order: Coleoptera
- Suborder: Adephaga
- Family: Carabidae
- Subfamily: Platyninae
- Tribe: Sphodrini
- Subtribe: Sphodrina
- Genus: Calathidius; Putzeys, 1873

Genus of beetles

Calathidius is a genus of ground beetles in the family Carabidae. There are at least three described species in Calathidius, found in the Canary Islands.

== Species ==
These three species belong to the genus Calathidius:

- Calathidius acuminatus (Wollaston, 1862)
- Calathidius brevithorax Machado, 1992
- Calathidius sphodroides (Wollaston, 1862)
