= Anchomenidius astur =

Scientific classification
- Kingdom: Animalia
- Phylum: Arthropoda
- Clade: Pancrustacea
- Class: Insecta
- Order: Coleoptera
- Suborder: Adephaga
- Family: Carabidae
- Genus: Anchomenidius
- Species: A. astur

Binomial name
- Anchomenidius astur (Sharp, 1873)

Species of beetle

Anchomenidius astur is a species of ground beetle which hail from the Platyninae subfamily that is endemic to Spain. It was discovered by David Sharp in 1873.

According to studies conducted in 2014, Anchomenidius astur could be useful in the restoration of areas contaminated by waste from former coal mines.
