= Anchomenidius feldmanni =

Scientific classification
- Kingdom: Animalia
- Phylum: Arthropoda
- Class: Insecta
- Order: Coleoptera
- Suborder: Adephaga
- Family: Carabidae
- Genus: Anchomenidius
- Species: A. feldmanni

Binomial name
- Anchomenidius feldmanni Wrase & Assmann, 2001

Species of beetle

Anchomenidius feldmanni is a species of ground beetle from the Platyninae subfamily that is endemic to Spain.
