= Broter =

Scientific classification
- Domain: Eukaryota
- Kingdom: Animalia
- Phylum: Arthropoda
- Class: Insecta
- Order: Coleoptera
- Suborder: Adephaga
- Family: Carabidae
- Subfamily: Platyninae
- Tribe: Sphodrini
- Subtribe: Atranopsina
- Genus: Broter; Andrewes, 1923
- Species: B. ovicollis

Binomial name
- Broter ovicollis Andrewes, 1923

Genus of beetles

Broter is a genus of ground beetles in the family Carabidae. This genus has a single species, Broter ovicollis. It is found in India.
