= Paraeutrichopus =

Scientific classification
- Domain: Eukaryota
- Kingdom: Animalia
- Phylum: Arthropoda
- Class: Insecta
- Order: Coleoptera
- Suborder: Adephaga
- Family: Carabidae
- Subfamily: Platyninae
- Tribe: Sphodrini
- Subtribe: Atranopsina
- Genus: Paraeutrichopus; Mateu, 1954

Genus of beetles

Paraeutrichopus is a genus of ground beetles in the family Carabidae. There are at least two described species in Paraeutrichopus, found in the Canary Islands.

== Species ==
These two species belong to the genus Paraeutrichopus:

- Paraeutrichopus harpaloides (Wollaston, 1864)
- Paraeutrichopus pecoudi Mateu, 1954
