= Morphodactyla =

Scientific classification
- Domain: Eukaryota
- Kingdom: Animalia
- Phylum: Arthropoda
- Class: Insecta
- Order: Coleoptera
- Suborder: Adephaga
- Family: Carabidae
- Subfamily: Platyninae
- Tribe: Sphodrini
- Subtribe: Dolichina
- Genus: Morphodactyla; Semenov, 1889

Genus of beetles

Morphodactyla is a genus of ground beetles in the family Carabidae. There are about seven described species in Morphodactyla, found in eastern Asia.

== Species ==
These seven species belong to the genus Morphodactyla:

- Morphodactyla alticola (Bates, 1891) (China)
- Morphodactyla coreica (Jedlicka, 1936) (North Korea and South Korea)
- Morphodactyla ishikawai (Nemoto, 1990) (South Korea)
- Morphodactyla kmecoi Lassalle, 2011 (China)
- Morphodactyla potanini Semenov, 1889 (China)
- Morphodactyla sehnali Lassalle, 2011 (China)
- Morphodactyla yulongensis Lassalle, 2011 (China)
