= Nipponosynuchus =

Scientific classification
- Domain: Eukaryota
- Kingdom: Animalia
- Phylum: Arthropoda
- Class: Insecta
- Order: Coleoptera
- Suborder: Adephaga
- Family: Carabidae
- Subfamily: Platyninae
- Tribe: Sphodrini
- Subtribe: Synuchina
- Genus: Nipponosynuchus; Morita, 1998
- Species: N. abnormalis

Binomial name
- Nipponosynuchus abnormalis Morita, 1998

Genus of beetles

Nipponosynuchus is a genus of ground beetles in the family Carabidae. This genus has a single species, Nipponosynuchus abnormalis. It is found in Japan.
