= Ifridytes =

Scientific classification
- Domain: Eukaryota
- Kingdom: Animalia
- Phylum: Arthropoda
- Class: Insecta
- Order: Coleoptera
- Suborder: Adephaga
- Family: Carabidae
- Subfamily: Platyninae
- Tribe: Sphodrini
- Subtribe: Sphodrina
- Genus: Ifridytes; Deuve & Queinnec, 1994
- Species: I. mateui

Binomial name
- Ifridytes mateui Deuve & Queinnec, 1994

Genus of beetles

Ifridytes is a genus of ground beetles in the family Carabidae. This genus has a single species, Ifridytes mateui. It is found in Morocco.
