= Licinopsis =

Scientific classification
- Domain: Eukaryota
- Kingdom: Animalia
- Phylum: Arthropoda
- Class: Insecta
- Order: Coleoptera
- Suborder: Adephaga
- Family: Carabidae
- Subfamily: Platyninae
- Tribe: Sphodrini
- Subtribe: Sphodrina
- Genus: Licinopsis; Bedel, 1899

Genus of beetles

Licinopsis is a genus of ground beetles in the family Carabidae. There are about six described species in Licinopsis, found in the Canary Islands.

== Species ==
These six species belong to the genus Licinopsis:

- Licinopsis alternans (Dejean, 1828)
- Licinopsis angustula Machado, 1987
- Licinopsis gaudini Jeannel, 1937
- Licinopsis obliterata (Wollaston, 1865)
- Licinopsis picescens (Wollaston, 1864)
- Licinopsis schurmanni Machado, 1987
