= Amaroschema =

Scientific classification
- Domain: Eukaryota
- Kingdom: Animalia
- Phylum: Arthropoda
- Class: Insecta
- Order: Coleoptera
- Suborder: Adephaga
- Family: Carabidae
- Subfamily: Platyninae
- Tribe: Sphodrini
- Subtribe: Atranopsina
- Genus: Amaroschema; Jeannel, 1943
- Species: A. gaudini

Binomial name
- Amaroschema gaudini Jeannel, 1943

Synonyms
- Amara canariensis Har. Lindberg, 1950; Amaroschema heinzi Jedlicka, 1963

Genus of beetles

Amaroschema is a genus of ground beetles in the family Carabidae. This genus has a single species, Amaroschema gaudini. It is found in the Canary Islands.
