= Pseudotaphoxenus =

Scientific classification
- Kingdom: Animalia
- Phylum: Arthropoda
- Class: Insecta
- Order: Coleoptera
- Suborder: Adephaga
- Family: Carabidae
- Subfamily: Platyninae
- Tribe: Sphodrini
- Subtribe: Sphodrina
- Genus: Pseudotaphoxenus; Schaufuss, 1865

Species
- See text

Genus of beetles

Pseudotaphoxenus is a genus of ground beetles in the family Carabidae. There are more than 110 described species in Pseudotaphoxenus, found in temperate Asia.

== Pseudotaphoxenus species ==
These 113 species are members of the genus Pseudotaphoxenus:

- P. abnormalis (Jedlicka, 1961) (Kyrgyzstan)
- P. achillei Kabak, 2018 (China)
- P. acutithorax Casale, 1988 (Kazakhstan)
- P. afghanus (Jedlicka, 1961) (Afghanistan)
- P. angusticollis (Fischer von Waldheim, 1823) (Kazakhstan, Russia, and Ukraine)
- P. aralensis Kabak, 2010 (Kazakhstan)
- P. balkhanicus Vereschagina & Kabak, 2000 (Turkmenistan)
- P. basilewskyi Casale, 1988 (Afghanistan and Turkmenistan)
- P. benesi Casale & Sciaky, 1999 (China)
- P. blumenthali (Casale, 1982) (Afghanistan)
- P. brevipennis Semenov, 1889 (China)
- P. brucei (Andrewes, 1930) (China)
- P. cavazzutii Casale & Sciaky, 1999 (China)
- P. cavicollis Sciaky & Pavesi, 1997 (China)
- P. chevrieri (Fairmaire, 1889) (China)
- P. chinensis (Jedlicka, 1953) (China)
- P. collaris L.Schaufuss, 1865 (Kyrgyzstan)
- P. csikii (Jedlicka, 1953) (Mongolia)
- P. dauricus (Fischer von Waldheim, 1823) (Kazakhstan, Mongolia, and Russia)
- P. dignus (Vereschagina, 1988) (Kyrgyzstan, Tadzhikistan, and Uzbekistan)
- P. dissors (Semenov, 1891) (Tadzhikistan)
- P. dostali Casale, 1988 (Kazakhstan and Kyrgyzstan)
- P. elegantulus Sciaky & Pavesi, 1997 (China)
- P. fassatii (Jedlicka, 1952) (Kazakhstan and Kyrgyzstan)
- P. ferghanensis Vereschagina & Kabak, 1996 (Kazakhstan, Kyrgyzstan, Tadzhikistan, and Uzbekistan)
- P. gansuensis (Jedlicka, 1953) (China)
- P. ghilarovi (Vereschagina, 1988) (Kazakhstan)
- P. giorgiofiorii Casale & Vereschagina, 1986 (Afghanistan, Iran, and Turkmenistan)
- P. gracilicornis J.Frivaldszky, 1892 (China)
- P. gracilis (Zoubkoff, 1833) (Kazakhstan, Turkmenistan, and Uzbekistan)
- P. gracillimus Semenov, 1889 (Tadzhikistan)
- P. gussakovskii Vereschagina & Kabak, 2000 (Tadzhikistan)
- P. haslundi (Emden, 1954) (Afghanistan)
- P. hauseri (Jedlicka, 1933) (China)
- P. hindukushi (Casale, 1982) (Afghanistan)
- P. horvathi (Jedlicka, 1952) (Russia)
- P. humeralis (Semenov, 1909) (Turkmenistan)
- P. igori Vereschagina & Kabak, 1996 (Kazakhstan)
- P. jureceki (Jedlicka, 1952) (China, Kazakhstan, and Kyrgyzstan)
- P. juvencus (Ballion, 1871) (Kyrgyzstan, Tadzhikistan, and Uzbekistan)
- P. kabakovi Casale & Vereschagina, 1986 (Afghanistan)
- P. kalganus (Jedlicka, 1953) (China)
- P. kansuensis (Jedlicka, 1965) (China)
- P. kaszabianus Casale, 1988 (Kazakhstan and Kyrgyzstan)
- P. kavani (Jedlicka, 1952) (Tadzhikistan)
- P. kazakhstanicus Kabak & Solodovnikov, 2016 (Kazakhstan)
- P. khan Casale, 1988 (China)
- P. kopetdaghi Vereschagina & Kabak, 2000 (Turkmenistan)
- P. kraatzi Heyden, 1882 (Tadzhikistan and Uzbekistan)
- P. kryzhanovskiji Casale, 1988 (China)
- P. kuljabensis (Jedlicka, 1961) (Tadzhikistan)
- P. kulti (Jedlicka, 1952) (Kyrgyzstan)
- P. kurdaiensis Vereschagina & Kabak, 1996 (Kazakhstan)
- P. lanzhouensis Lassalle, 1993 (China)
- P. licenti (Jedlicka, 1939) (China)
- P. lutshniki (Jedlicka, 1952) (Kazakhstan)
- P. marani (Jedlicka, 1952) (Kazakhstan)
- P. mazenderanus (Vereschagina, 1987) (Iran)
- P. medvedevi (Vereschagina, 1988) (Tadzhikistan)
- P. mentitus (Vereschagina, 1989) (Kazakhstan)
- P. meurguesae Casale & Ledoux, 1996 (Afghanistan)
- P. michajlovi (Vereschagina, 1988) (Uzbekistan)
- P. mihoki (Jedlicka, 1953) (China)
- P. minimus (Jedlicka, 1952) (China and Kyrgyzstan)
- P. mongolicus (Jedlicka, 1953) (China and Mongolia)
- P. niger (Jedlicka, 1953) (China)
- P. nitidicollis Sciaky & Pavesi, 1997 (China)
- P. obenbergeri (Jedlicka, 1952) (Tadzhikistan)
- P. occultus (Ballion, 1871) (Kazakhstan and Kyrgyzstan)
- P. oopterus Sciaky & Pavesi, 1997 (China)
- P. optatus Vereschagina & Kabak, 1996 (China)
- P. originalis L.Schaufuss, 1865 (Mongolia)
- P. oruzganensis Casale & Vereschagina, 1986 (Afghanistan)
- P. ovalis (Motschulsky, 1844) (Kazakhstan and Kyrgyzstan)
- P. ovipennis Casale & Vereschagina, 1986 (Afghanistan)
- P. paropamisicus (Casale, 1982) (Afghanistan)
- P. parvulus Semenov, 1889 (China, Kazakhstan, Kyrgyzstan, and Uzbekistan)
- P. planicollis (Gebler, 1833) (Kyrgyzstan and Mongolia)
- P. plutschewskyi (Jedlicka, 1952) (Tadzhikistan)
- P. pongraczi (Jedlicka, 1952) (Kazakhstan and Kyrgyzstan)
- P. povolnyi (Jedlicka, 1967) (Afghanistan)
- P. pseudocollaris Casale, 1988 (Kazakhstan and Kyrgyzstan)
- P. punctibasis (Jedlicka, 1952) (Uzbekistan)
- P. putshkovi Vereschagina & Kabak, 1996 (Kyrgyzstan)
- P. reichardti (Lutshnik, 1930) (China, Tadzhikistan, and Uzbekistan)
- P. robustus Lassalle, 1993 (China)
- P. rufitarsis (Fischer von Waldheim, 1823) (Georgia, Moldova, and Russia)
- P. rugipennis (Faldermann, 1836) (China, Mongolia, and Russia)
- P. schaufussi (Jedlicka, 1953) (Mongolia)
- P. semiopacus Lassalle, 1993 (China)
- P. similis Vereschagina & Kabak, 2000 (Kyrgyzstan)
- P. sinicus Casale, 1988 (China)
- P. staudingeri (Jedlicka, 1929) (China)
- P. sterbai (Jedlicka, 1952) (Kyrgyzstan)
- P. stricticollis Casale, 1988 (Tadzhikistan)
- P. strigitarsis (Jedlicka, 1958) (Tadzhikistan)
- P. subcostatus (Ménétriés, 1837) (China, Mongolia, and Russia)
- P. subcylindricus (Semenov, 1891) (Afghanistan and Turkmenistan)
- P. substriatus (Ballion, 1871) (Kyrgyzstan, Tadzhikistan, and Uzbekistan)
- P. susterai (Jedlicka, 1952) (Kyrgyzstan)
- P. tarantsha Kabak, 2018 (China)
- P. taschkensis (Jedlicka, 1952) (Uzbekistan)
- P. thibetanus Casale, 1988 (China)
- P. thoracicus (Gebler, 1843) (Azerbaijan, Kazakhstan, Kyrgyzstan, and Uzbekistan)
- P. tianshanicus (Semenov, 1908) (China and Kyrgyzstan)
- P. tomskoensis (Jedlicka, 1960) (Russia)
- P. vereschaginae Casale, 1988 (Kyrgyzstan)
- P. wrasei Casale & Sciaky, 1999 (Kazakhstan)
- P. xiahensis Lassalle, 1993 (China)
- P. yunnanus Casale & Sciaky, 1999 (China)
- P. yupeiyui Casale, 1988 (China)
- P. znojkoi (Kryzhanovskij, 1964) (Kazakhstan)
- P. zvarici Vereschagina & Kabak, 1996 (China)
