= Anchomenidius =

Scientific classification
- Domain: Eukaryota
- Kingdom: Animalia
- Phylum: Arthropoda
- Class: Insecta
- Order: Coleoptera
- Suborder: Adephaga
- Family: Carabidae
- Subfamily: Platyninae
- Tribe: Sphodrini
- Subtribe: Dolichina
- Genus: Anchomenidius; Heyden, 1880

Genus of beetles

Anchomenidius is a genus of ground beetles in the family Carabidae. There are at least two described species in Anchomenidius, found in Spain.

== Species ==
These two species belong to the genus Anchomenidius:

- Anchomenidius astur (Sharp, 1873)
- Anchomenidius feldmanni Wrase & Assmann, 2001
