= Gomerina =

Scientific classification
- Kingdom: Animalia
- Phylum: Arthropoda
- Class: Insecta
- Order: Coleoptera
- Suborder: Adephaga
- Family: Carabidae
- Subfamily: Platyninae
- Tribe: Sphodrini
- Subtribe: Atranopsina
- Genus: Gomerina; Bolivar y Pieltain, 1940

Genus of beetles

Gomerina is a genus of ground beetles in the family Carabidae. There are at least two described species in Gomerina, found in the Canary Islands.

== Species ==
These two species belong to the genus Gomerina:

- Gomerina calathiformis (Wollaston, 1865)
- Gomerina nitidicollis (Lindberg, 1953)
