= Trephionus abiba =

Scientific classification
- Domain: Eukaryota
- Kingdom: Animalia
- Phylum: Arthropoda
- Class: Insecta
- Order: Coleoptera
- Suborder: Adephaga
- Family: Carabidae
- Genus: Trephionus
- Species: T. abiba

Binomial name
- Trephionus abiba Sasakawa & Itô, 2018

Species of beetle

Trephionus abiba, is a species of beetle belonging to the family Carabidae. It is endemic to Japan.

== Etymology ==
The specific name abiba is an anagram of the sympatric species Trephionus babai.

== Description ==
Body length of male is about 8.1 mm, whereas female is 9.8 mm. Head and pronotum black. Elytra blackish brown to black. Endophallus stout in shape. No hind wings. Dorso-apical lobe simple and rudimentary. Apex of aedeagus truncate.
