= Eosphodrus =

Scientific classification
- Domain: Eukaryota
- Kingdom: Animalia
- Phylum: Arthropoda
- Class: Insecta
- Order: Coleoptera
- Suborder: Adephaga
- Family: Carabidae
- Subfamily: Platyninae
- Tribe: Sphodrini
- Subtribe: Sphodrina
- Genus: Eosphodrus; Casale, 1988
- Species: E. potanini

Binomial name
- Eosphodrus potanini (Semenov, 1889)

Genus of beetles

Eosphodrus is a genus of ground beetles in the family Carabidae. This genus has a single species, Eosphodrus potanini. It is found in China.
