= Amphimasoreus =

Scientific classification
- Domain: Eukaryota
- Kingdom: Animalia
- Phylum: Arthropoda
- Class: Insecta
- Order: Coleoptera
- Suborder: Adephaga
- Family: Carabidae
- Subfamily: Platyninae
- Tribe: Sphodrini
- Subtribe: Atranopsina
- Genus: Amphimasoreus; Piochard de la Brûlerie, 1875
- Species: A. amaroides

Binomial name
- Amphimasoreus amaroides Piochard de la Brûlerie, 1875

Genus of beetles

Amphimasoreus is a genus of ground beetles in the family Carabidae. This genus has a single species, Amphimasoreus amaroides. It is found in Israel, Lebanon, Syria, and Turkey.
