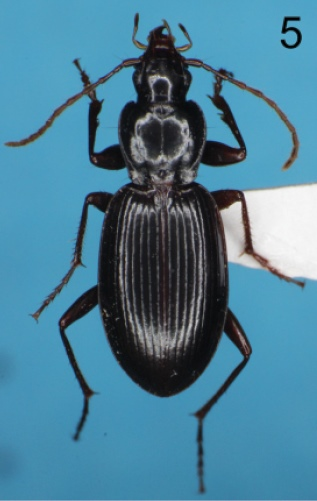
- Trephionus babai, Japan

Scientific classification
- Domain: Eukaryota
- Kingdom: Animalia
- Phylum: Arthropoda
- Class: Insecta
- Order: Coleoptera
- Suborder: Adephaga
- Family: Carabidae
- Subfamily: Platyninae
- Tribe: Sphodrini
- Subtribe: Synuchina
- Genus: Trephionus; Bates, 1883

= Trephionus =

Genus of beetles

Trephionus is a genus of ground beetles in the family Carabidae. There are about 19 described species in Trephionus, found in Japan. Five of these were new species described in 2018.

== Description ==
All the species are reddish brown to black in color with a shiny surface. Mouthpart appendages and antennae are yellowish to reddish brown, and the legs are light to blackish brown. There are no hind wings. The eyes are less convex, the pronotum is moderately convex, and the elytra are oblong and moderately convex.

== Species ==
- Trephionus abiba Sasakawa & Itô, 2018
- Trephionus babai Habu, 1978
- Trephionus bifidilobatus Sasakawa & Itô, 2018
- Trephionus chujoi Habu, 1961
- Trephionus cylindriphallus Sasakawa, 2018
- Trephionus igai Ueno, 1955
- Trephionus inexpectatus Sasakawa, 2018
- Trephionus karosai Ueno, 1955
- Trephionus kinoshitai Habu, 1954
- Trephionus kyushuensis Habu, 1978
- Trephionus microphthalmus Ueno, 1955
- Trephionus mikii Habu, 1966
- Trephionus nikkoensis Bates, 1883
- Trephionus niumontanus Sasakawa, 2018
- Trephionus obscurus Ueno, 1955
- Trephionus shibataianus Habu, 1978
- Trephionus sordidatus Habu, 1954
- Trephionus subcavicola Ueno, 1955
- Trephionus takakurai Habu, 1954
