= Casaleius =

Scientific classification
- Domain: Eukaryota
- Kingdom: Animalia
- Phylum: Arthropoda
- Class: Insecta
- Order: Coleoptera
- Suborder: Adephaga
- Family: Carabidae
- Subfamily: Platyninae
- Tribe: Sphodrini
- Subtribe: Dolichina
- Genus: Casaleius; Sciaky & Wrase, 1998
- Species: C. ferrugineus

Binomial name
- Casaleius ferrugineus Sciaky & Wrase, 1998

Genus of beetles

Casaleius is a genus of ground beetles in the family Carabidae. This genus has a single species, Casaleius ferrugineus. It is found in China.
