= Dolichos =

Dolichos or Dolichus is derived from Ancient Greek δολιχός 'long'. It may refer to:

- Dolichus (beetle), a genus of insects
- Dolichos (plant), a genus of plants
- Dolichos (running race), a race in the ancient Olympics
