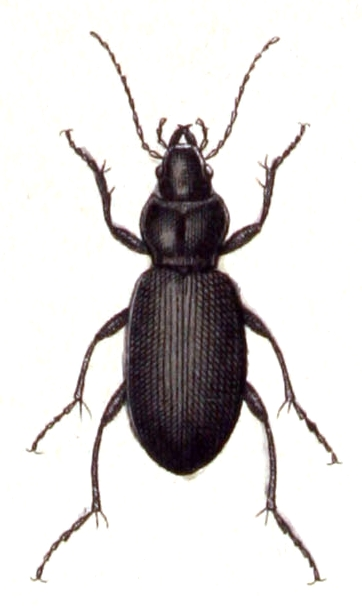
- Sphodrus leucophthalmus

Scientific classification
- Domain: Eukaryota
- Kingdom: Animalia
- Phylum: Arthropoda
- Class: Insecta
- Order: Coleoptera
- Suborder: Adephaga
- Family: Carabidae
- Subfamily: Platyninae
- Tribe: Sphodrini
- Subtribe: Sphodrina
- Genus: Sphodrus; Clairville, 1806

= Sphodrus =

Genus of beetles

Sphodrus is a genus of ground beetle native to the Palearctic (including Europe), the Near East, North Africa and the Oriental region. It contains the following species:

- Sphodrus leucophthalmus Linne, 1758
- Sphodrus trochanteribus Mateu, 1990
