= Hystricosphodrus =

Scientific classification
- Domain: Eukaryota
- Kingdom: Animalia
- Phylum: Arthropoda
- Class: Insecta
- Order: Coleoptera
- Suborder: Adephaga
- Family: Carabidae
- Subfamily: Platyninae
- Tribe: Sphodrini
- Subtribe: Sphodrina
- Genus: Hystricosphodrus; Casale & Giachino, 2004
- Species: H. vailatii

Binomial name
- Hystricosphodrus vailatii Casale & Giachino, 2004

Genus of beetles

Hystricosphodrus is a genus of ground beetles in the family Carabidae. This genus has a single species, Hystricosphodrus vailatii. It is found in Greece.
