= Miquihuana =

Scientific classification
- Domain: Eukaryota
- Kingdom: Animalia
- Phylum: Arthropoda
- Class: Insecta
- Order: Coleoptera
- Suborder: Adephaga
- Family: Carabidae
- Subfamily: Platyninae
- Tribe: Sphodrini
- Subtribe: Sphodrina
- Genus: Miquihuana; Barr, 1982
- Species: M. rhadiniformis

Binomial name
- Miquihuana rhadiniformis Barr, 1982

Genus of beetles

Miquihuana is a genus of ground beetles in the family Carabidae. This genus has a single species, Miquihuana rhadiniformis. It is found in Mexico.
