= Reflexisphodrus =

Scientific classification
- Domain: Eukaryota
- Kingdom: Animalia
- Phylum: Arthropoda
- Class: Insecta
- Order: Coleoptera
- Suborder: Adephaga
- Family: Carabidae
- Subfamily: Platyninae
- Tribe: Sphodrini
- Subtribe: Sphodrina
- Genus: Reflexisphodrus; Casale, 1988

Genus of beetles

Reflexisphodrus is a genus of ground beetles in the family Carabidae. There are about 12 described species in Reflexisphodrus, found in China and Mongolia.

== Species ==
These 12 species belong to the genus Reflexisphodrus:

- Reflexisphodrus eugrammus (Vereschagina, 1989) (China)
- Reflexisphodrus formosus (Semenov, 1895) (China and Mongolia)
- Reflexisphodrus gracilior Lassalle & Marcilhac, 1999 (China)
- Reflexisphodrus graciliusculus (Vereschagina, 1989) (China)
- Reflexisphodrus lanzouicus Lassalle & Marcilhac, 1999 (China)
- Reflexisphodrus marginipennis (Fairmaire, 1891) (China)
- Reflexisphodrus ollivieri Lassalle, 2007 (China)
- Reflexisphodrus refleximargo (Reitter, 1894) (Mongolia)
- Reflexisphodrus reflexipennis (Semenov, 1889) (China and Mongolia)
- Reflexisphodrus remondorum Lassalle & Marcilhac, 1999 (China)
- Reflexisphodrus stenocephalus (Vereschagina, 1989) (China)
- Reflexisphodrus wuduensis Lassalle & Marcilhac, 1999 (China)
