= Physignathus (disambiguation) =

Physignathus is a monotypic genus of lizards known as the Chinese water dragon.

Physignathus may also refer to:

- Physignathus, a character in the Greek comedy Batrachomyomachia
- Sphodropsis physignathus, a species of the genus of beetles Sphodropsis
