= Onotokiba =

Scientific classification
- Domain: Eukaryota
- Kingdom: Animalia
- Phylum: Arthropoda
- Class: Insecta
- Order: Coleoptera
- Suborder: Adephaga
- Family: Carabidae
- Subfamily: Platyninae
- Tribe: Platynini
- Subtribe: Platynina
- Genus: Onotokiba; Alluaud, 1927

Genus of beetles

Onotokiba is a genus of ground beetles in the family Carabidae. There are about six described species in Onotokiba.

== Species ==
These six species belong to the genus Onotokiba:

- Onotokiba guineensis Basilewsky, 1951 (Guinea and Sierra Leone)
- Onotokiba katangana Basilewsky, 1953 (Democratic Republic of the Congo)
- Onotokiba lomaensis Lecordier, 1966 (Sierra Leone)
- Onotokiba orbithorax Alluaud, 1926 (worldwide)
- Onotokiba ruandana Basilewsky, 1956 (Burundi, Democratic Republic of the Congo, and Rwanda)
- Onotokiba uluguruana Basilewsky, 1962 (Tanzania)
