= Trephionus shibataianus =

Scientific classification
- Kingdom: Animalia
- Phylum: Arthropoda
- Class: Insecta
- Order: Coleoptera
- Suborder: Adephaga
- Family: Carabidae
- Genus: Trephionus
- Species: T. shibataianus

Binomial name
- Trephionus shibataianus Habu, 1978

Synonyms
- Synuchus nikkoensis kinoshitai Lindroth (1956)

Species of beetle

Trephionus shibataianus, is a species of beetle belonging to the family Carabidae. It is endemic to Japan.

== Description ==
Body length of male is about 8.4 mm. Head and pronotum black. Elytra blackish brown to black. Endophallus stout. No hind wings. Dorso-apical lobe narrowed apically. Apex of aedeagus truncate.
