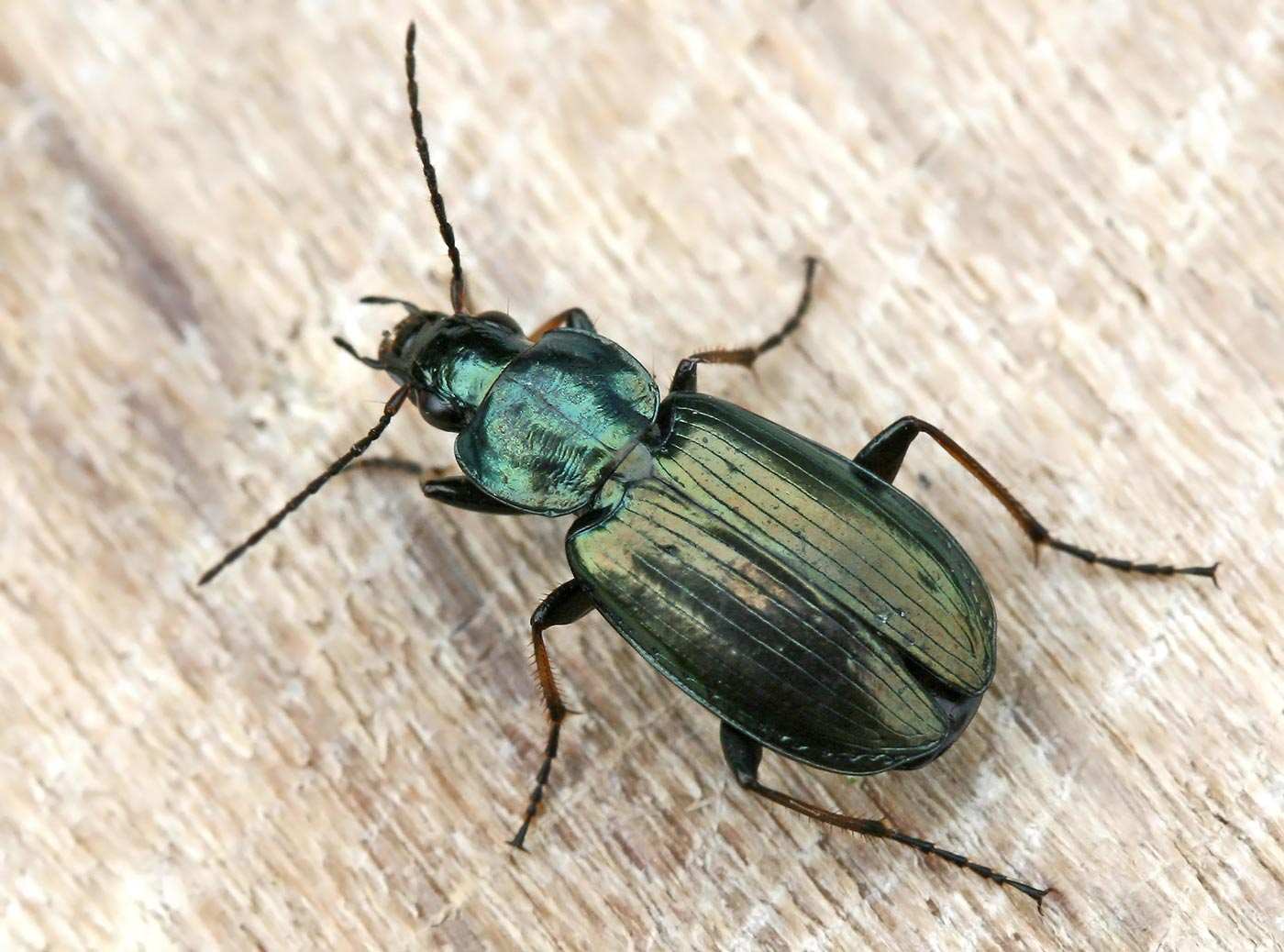
- Unidentified Agonum species

Scientific classification
- Kingdom: Animalia
- Phylum: Arthropoda
- Clade: Pancrustacea
- Class: Insecta
- Order: Coleoptera
- Suborder: Adephaga
- Family: Carabidae
- Subfamily: Platyninae; Bonelli, 1810

Tribes
- Omphreini Ganglbauer, 1891 Platynini Bonelli, 1810 Sphodrini Laporte, 1834

= Platyninae =

Subfamily of beetles

Platyninae is a subfamily of ground beetles (family Carabidae).

== Genera ==
The subfamily Platyninae contains about 250 genera organized into three tribes:

Tribe Omphreini Ganglbauer, 1891
Omphreus Dejean, 1828
Tribe Platynini Bonelli, 1810
Abacetodes Straneo, 1939
Achaetocephala Habu, 1975
Achaetoprothorax Habu, 1978
Aepsera Chaudoir, 1874
Agelaea Gené, 1839
Agonidium Jeannel, 1948
Agonobembix Jeannel, 1948
Agonoriascus Basilewsky, 1985
Agonorites Jeannel, 1951
Agonum Bonelli, 1810
Altagonum Darlington, 1952
Anchomenus Bonelli, 1810
Andinocolpodes Perrault, 1991
Andrewesius Andrewes, 1939
Aparupa Andrewes, 1930
Archagonum Basilewsky, 1953
Archicolpodes J.Schmidt, 2001
Arhytinus Bates, 1889
Atranodes Jedlicka, 1953
Atranus LeConte, 1847
Austroglyptolenus Roig-Juñent, 2003
Beckeria Jedlicka, 1931
Blackburnia Sharp, 1878
Bothrocolpodes Basilewsky, 1985
Bruskespar Morvan, 1998
Bruskmoal Morvan, 1998
Bryanites Valentine, 1987
Callidagonum Lorenz, 1998
Cardiomera Bassi, 1834
Catacolpodes Basilewsky, 1985
Celaenagonum Habu, 1978
Chaetagonum Burgeon, 1933
Chaetosaurus J.Schmidt, 2001
Cinctagonum Baehr, 2012
Cistelagonum Baehr, 2012
Collagonum Baehr, 1995
Colpodes W.S.MacLeay, 1825
Colpoides Jedlicka, 1931
Colpomimus Basilewsky, 1985
Colposphodrus Jedlicka, 1953
Ctenognathus Fairmaire, 1843
Cymenopterus Jeannel, 1948
Cyrtopilus Basilewsky, 1985
Dalatagonum Fedorenko, 2011
Deliaesianum Morvan, 1999
Deltocolpodes Morvan, 1992
Dendragonum Jeannel, 1948
Diacanthostylus Habu, 1978
Dicranoncoides Habu, 1978
Dicranoncus Chaudoir, 1850
Dinocolpodes J.Schmidt, 2001
Dirotus W.S.MacLeay, 1825
Dister Morvan, 2006
Dolichocolpodes Basilewsky, 1985
Dyscolus Dejean, 1831
Elliptoleus Bates, 1882
Enoicus Péringuey, 1896
Epicolpodes Basilewsky, 1985
Eucolpodes Jeannel, 1948
Euleptus Klug, 1833
Euplynes Schmidt-Goebel, 1846
Feroniascus Jeannel, 1951
Fortagonum Darlington, 1952
Galiciotyphlotes Assmann, 1999
Gastragonum Darlington, 1952
Glaucagonum Habu, 1978
Glyptolenoides Perrault, 1991
Glyptolenus Bates, 1878
Gyrochaetostylus Habu, 1978
Habragonum Ueno, 1964
Hannaphota Landin, 1955
Haplocolpodes Jeannel, 1951
Haplopeza Boheman, 1848
Helluocolpodes Liebherr, 2005
Hemiplatynus Casey, 1920
Henvelik Morvan, 1999
Herculagonum Baehr, 2002
Hikosanoagonum Habu, 1954
Idiagonum Darlington, 1952
Idiastes Andrewes, 1931
Idiocolpodes Basilewsky, 1985
Incagonum Liebherr, 1994
Iridagonum Darlington, 1952
Ischnagonum Kasahara & Satô, 1997
Jocqueius Basilewsky, 1988
Jujiroa Ueno, 1952
Kalchdigor Morvan, 1999
Kar Morvan, 1998
Karnes Morvan, 2010
Kaszabellus Jedlicka, 1954
Kiwiplatynus Larochelle & Larivière, 2021
Klapperichella Jedlicka, 1956
Kuceraianum Morvan, 2002
Kupeplatynus Larochelle & Larivière, 2021
Laevagonum Darlington, 1952
Lassalleianum Morvan, 1999
Lepcha Andrewes, 1930
Leptagonum Kolbe, 1897
Leptocolpodes Basilewsky, 1985
Letouzeya Bruneau de Miré, 1982
Liagonum Jeannel, 1948
Liamegalonychus Basilewsky, 1963
Liocolpodes Basilewsky, 1985
Lissagonum Habu, 1978
Lithagonum Darlington, 1952
Lobocolpodes Basilewsky, 1985
Lorostema Motschulsky, 1865
Loxocrepis Eschscholtz, 1829
Lucicolpodes J.Schmidt, 2000
Maculagonum Darlington, 1952
Maoriplatynus Larochelle & Larivière, 2021
Meleagros Kirschenhofer, 1999
Mesocolpodes Basilewsky, 1985
Metacolpodes Jeannel, 1948
Mexisphodrus Barr, 1965
Montagonum Darlington, 1952
Mooreagonum Baehr, 2016
Morimotoidius Habu, 1954
Nebriagonum Darlington, 1952
Negreum Habu, 1958
Neobatenus Jeannel, 1948
Neocolpodes Jeannel, 1948
Neodendragonum Basilewsky, 1953
Neomegalonychus Jeannel, 1948
Nesiocolpodes Jeannel, 1948
Nipponagonum Habu, 1978
Notagonum Darlington, 1952
Notocolpodes Basilewsky, 1985
Notoplatynus B.Moore, 1985
Nymphagonum Habu, 1978
Olisthopus Dejean, 1828
Oncostylus Habu, 1978
Onotokiba Alluaud, 1927
Onycholabis Bates, 1873
Onypterygia Dejean, 1831
Orophicus Alluaud, 1925
Orthotrichus Peyron, 1856
Oxygonium Basilewsky, 1951
Oxypselaphus Chaudoir, 1843
Pachybatenus Basilewsky, 1973
Pachyferonia Jeannel, 1951
Paracolpodes Basilewsky, 1985
Paraliagonum Basilewsky, 1957
Paramegalonychus Basilewsky, 1953
Paranchodemus Habu, 1978
Paranchus Lindroth, 1974
Paraplatynus Baehr, 2016
Pawgammm Morvan, 1999
Platyagonum Habu, 1978
Platynus Bonelli, 1810
Plaumannium Liebke, 1939
Plicagonum Darlington, 1952
Ponapagonum Darlington, 1970
Potamagonum Darlington, 1952
Praepristus Kirschenhofer, 1999
Promecoptera Dejean, 1831
Promegalonychus Basilewsky, 1953
Prophenorites Basilewsky, 1985
Prosphodrus Britton, 1959
Protocolpodes Basilewsky, 1985
Pseudanchomenus Tarnier, 1860
Pseudobatenus Basilewsky, 1951
Pseudomegalonychus Basilewsky, 1950
Rhadine LeConte, 1846
Rupa Jedlicka, 1935
Scotagonum Habu, 1978
Sericoda Kirby, 1837
Shibataia Habu, 1978
Sinocolpodes J.Schmidt, 2001
Skoeda Morvan, 1995
Skorlagad Morvan, 1999
Skouedhirraad Morvan, 1999
Sophroferonia Alluaud, 1933
Speagonum B.Moore, 1977
Speocolpodes Barr, 1974
Speokokosia Alluaud, 1932
Sperkanhir Morvan, 2010
Stenocnemus Mannerheim, 1837
Straneoa Basilewsky, 1953
Syletor Tschitscherine, 1899
Takasagoagonum Habu, 1977
Tanystoma Motschulsky, 1845
Tarsagonum Darlington, 1952
Tetraleucus Casey, 1920
Tostkar Morvan, 1998
Trogloagonum Casale, 1982
Tuiplatynus Larochelle & Larivière, 2021
Vitagonum B.Moore, 1999
Vulcanophilus Heller, 1898
Xestagonum Habu, 1978
†Praeanchodemus Schmidt et al.
Tribe Sphodrini Laporte, 1834
Subtribe Atranopsina Baehr, 1982

Amaroschema Jeannel, 1943
Amphimasoreus Piochard de la Brûlerie, 1875
Atranopsis Baehr, 1982
Broter Andrewes, 1923
Gomerina Bolivar y Pieltain, 1940
Paraeutrichopus Mateu, 1954
Platyderus Stephens, 1827
Pseudomyas Uyttenboogaart, 1929
Pseudoplatyderus Bolivar y Pieltain, 1940

Subtribe Calathina Laporte, 1834

Calathus Bonelli, 1810
Thermoscelis Putzeys, 1873

Subtribe Dolichina Brullé, 1834

Acalathus Semenov, 1889
Anchomenidius Heyden, 1880
Casaleius Sciaky & Wrase, 1998
Dolichus Bonelli, 1810
Doliodactyla Sciaky & Wrase, 1998
Morphodactyla Semenov, 1889
Xestopus Andrewes, 1937

Subtribe Pristosiina Lindroth, 1956

Pristosia Motschulsky, 1865

Subtribe Sphodrina Laporte, 1834

Calathidius Putzeys, 1873
Cephalosdrophus Lassalle & Marcilhac, 1999
Eosphodrus Casale, 1988
Eremosphodrus Semenov, 1909
Himalosphodrus Casale, 1988
Hystricosphodrus Casale & Giachino, 2004
Ifridytes Deuve & Queinnec, 1994
Laemostenus Bonelli, 1810
Licinopsis Bedel, 1899
Miquihuana Barr, 1982
Pseudotaphoxenus L.Schaufuss, 1865
Reflexisphodrus Casale, 1988
Sphodropsis Seidlitz, 1887
Sphodrus Clairville, 1806
Stenolepta Semenov, 1889
Taphoxenus Motschulsky, 1850

Subtribe Synuchina Lindroth, 1956

Nipponosynuchus Morita, 1998
Parabroscus Lindroth, 1956
Synuchus Gyllenhal, 1810
Trephionus Bates, 1883
