= Euplynes =

Scientific classification
- Kingdom: Animalia
- Phylum: Arthropoda
- Class: Insecta
- Order: Coleoptera
- Suborder: Adephaga
- Family: Carabidae
- Subfamily: Platyninae
- Tribe: Platynini
- Subtribe: Platynina
- Genus: Euplynes; Schmidt-Goebel, 1846

Synonyms
- Pseudocalleida Kirschenhofer, 2010

Genus of beetles

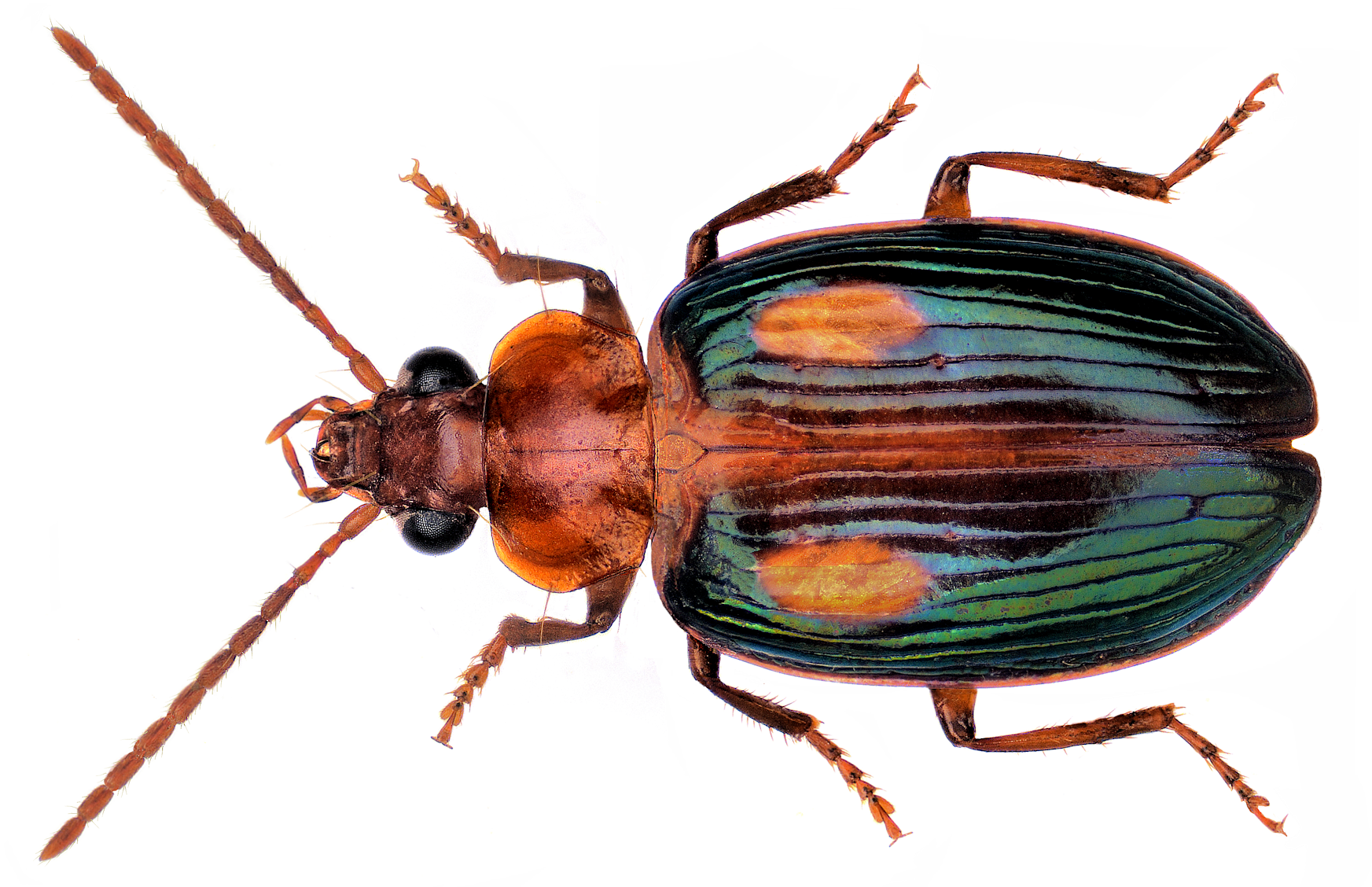

Euplynes is a genus of beetles in the family Carabidae, containing the following species:

- Euplynes abyssinicus Mateu, 1974
- Euplynes apicalis Darlington, 1952
- Euplynes apicefumatus Mateu, 1974
- Euplynes aurocinctus Bates, 1889
- Euplynes balthasari Jedlicka, 1935
- Euplynes batesi Harold, 1877
- Euplynes bicoloripennis Burgeon, 1937
- Euplynes bredoi Burgeon, 1942
- Euplynes brosseti Mateu, 1974
- Euplynes brunneus Straneo, 1943
- Euplynes burgeoni Basilewsky, 1946
- Euplynes callidiodes (Chaudoir, 1879)
- Euplynes cyanipennis Schmidt-Goebel, 1846
- Euplynes decoloratus Baehr, 2000
- Euplynes ghesquierei Burgeon, 1937
- Euplynes guttatus Andrewes, 1930
- Euplynes laetus Darlington, 1952
- Euplynes lebistinoides Burgeon, 1937
- Euplynes limbipennis Bates, 1889
- Euplynes marginatus Andrewes, 1923
- Euplynes miyakei Habu, 1974
- Euplynes nidicola Burgeon, 1937
- Euplynes nigripes (Fairmaire, 1901)
- Euplynes punctatus Mateu, 1974
- Euplynes splendidulus Landin, 1955
- Euplynes viridis Andrewes, 1933
- Euplynes wittei Burgeon, 1937
