= Neocolpodes =

Scientific classification
- Kingdom: Animalia
- Phylum: Arthropoda
- Class: Insecta
- Order: Coleoptera
- Suborder: Adephaga
- Family: Carabidae
- Subfamily: Platyninae
- Tribe: Platynini
- Subtribe: Platynina
- Genus: Neocolpodes; Jeannel, 1948

Genus of beetles

Neocolpodes is a genus of beetles in the family Carabidae, containing the following species, most from Madagascar:

- Neocolpodes acrentomus Jeannel, 1948
- Neocolpodes acritonius (Basilewsky, 1970)
- Neocolpodes afrellus Jeannel, 1951
- Neocolpodes alberti (Alluaud, 1909)
- Neocolpodes alluaudi (Vinson, 1939)
- Neocolpodes almasius Basilewsky, 1985
- Neocolpodes amblyodon (Alluaud, 1899)
- Neocolpodes andasyanus Basilewsky, 1985
- Neocolpodes andohahelo Basilewsky, 1985
- Neocolpodes andrangoloakae Jeannel, 1948
- Neocolpodes andreae (Alluaud, 1935)
- Neocolpodes andrianus Jeannel, 1948
- Neocolpodes andringitrae Basilewsky, 1985
- Neocolpodes androronae Basilewsky, 1985
- Neocolpodes angulosus (Jeannel, 1951)
- Neocolpodes anjavidilavae Basilewsky, 1985
- Neocolpodes anosibensis Basilewsky, 1985
- Neocolpodes anosyanus Basilewsky, 1985
- Neocolpodes antamponae Basilewsky, 1985
- Neocolpodes balachowskyi (Basilewsky, 1970)
- Neocolpodes basilewskyi Jeannel, 1948
- Neocolpodes beananae Basilewsky, 1985
- Neocolpodes beryllinus Basilewsky, 1985
- Neocolpodes bessoni (Alluaud, 1909)
- Neocolpodes blandus (Alluaud, 1897)
- Neocolpodes cachani (Jeannel, 1951)
- Neocolpodes callizonatus (Fairmaire, 1901)
- Neocolpodes casalei Basilewsky, 1985
- Neocolpodes coeruleotinctus Basilewsky, 1985
- Neocolpodes coeruleus Basilewsky, 1985
- Neocolpodes conciliatus Basilewsky, 1985
- Neocolpodes confusus Basilewsky, 1985
- Neocolpodes contractus Basilewsky, 1985
- Neocolpodes coptoderus (Dejean, 1829) RN
- Neocolpodes corpulentus Basilewsky, 1985
- Neocolpodes corythenus Basilewsky, 1970
- Neocolpodes crassicollis Jeannel, 1948
- Neocolpodes cyaneoviolaceus Basilewsky, 1985
- Neocolpodes cyaneus Basilewsky, 1985
- Neocolpodes cyanura (Alluaud, 1909)
- Neocolpodes darlingtoni Basilewsky, 1985
- Neocolpodes descarpentriesianus Basilewsky, 1985
- Neocolpodes deuvei Basilewsky, 1985
- Neocolpodes dialithoides Basilewsky, 1985
- Neocolpodes dialithus (Alluaud, 1909)
- Neocolpodes didy Basilewsky, 1985
- Neocolpodes dieganus (Alluaud, 1897)
- Neocolpodes dilaticollis Jeannel, 1948
- Neocolpodes dirrhaphis (Alluaud, 1897)
- Neocolpodes effulgens Basilewsky, 1970
- Neocolpodes emilii (Alluaud, 1909)
- Neocolpodes episcopalis (Jeannel, 1951)
- Neocolpodes eucharis (Alluaud, 1935)
- Neocolpodes evictus Basilewsky, 1985
- Neocolpodes exiguus (Jeannel, 1951)
- Neocolpodes fairmairei (Alluaud, 1897)
- Neocolpodes fischeri (Chaudoir, 1850)
- Neocolpodes gemmula (Alluaud, 1897)
- Neocolpodes griveaudi Basilewsky, 1985
- Neocolpodes habui Basilewsky, 1985
- Neocolpodes hylobates (Alluaud, 1935)
- Neocolpodes hylobius (Alluaud, 1935)
- Neocolpodes hylochorus (Jeannel, 1951)
- Neocolpodes imerinae (Alluaud, 1897)
- Neocolpodes inermis Jeannel, 1948
- Neocolpodes invocatus Basilewsky, 1985
- Neocolpodes isakae Jeannel, 1948
- Neocolpodes jeannelianus Basilewsky, 1985
- Neocolpodes kryzhanovskyi Basilewsky, 1985
- Neocolpodes laevipennis Jeannel, 1948
- Neocolpodes lapillus (Alluaud, 1932)
- Neocolpodes lecordieri Basilewsky, 1985
- Neocolpodes leptotatus (Alluaud, 1935)
- Neocolpodes leptoteroides Basilewsky, 1985
- Neocolpodes leptoterus (Alluaud, 1935)
- Neocolpodes limbicollis (Fairmaire, 1899)
- Neocolpodes lyauteyi (Alluaud, 1909)
- Neocolpodes malleatus (Alluaud, 1935)
- Neocolpodes mangindranus Basilewsky, 1985
- Neocolpodes marginatus Jeannel, 1948
- Neocolpodes mathiauxi (Alluaud, 1909)
- Neocolpodes meunieri Jeannel, 1948
- Neocolpodes micaauri (Alluaud, 1897)
- Neocolpodes milloti Jeannel, 1949
- Neocolpodes minutus (Jeannel, 1951)
- Neocolpodes monticola Jeannel, 1951
- Neocolpodes montis (Alluaud, 1909)
- Neocolpodes motoensis (Burgeon, 1937)
- Neocolpodes mutans (Fairmaire, 1902)
- Neocolpodes nephriticus Basilewsky, 1985
- Neocolpodes nigrocyaneus Basilewsky, 1985
- Neocolpodes nitens (Jeannel, 1951)
- Neocolpodes oberthueri (Alluaud, 1897)
- Neocolpodes optimus Basilewsky, 1985
- Neocolpodes orophilus Basilewsky, 1985
- Neocolpodes oxypterus Jeannel, 1948
- Neocolpodes papagoensis Basilewsky, 1985
- Neocolpodes parenthesis (Alluaud, 1897)
- Neocolpodes paromius (Alluaud, 1932)
- Neocolpodes pauliani Jeannel, 1949
- Neocolpodes perinetanus Jeannel, 1948
- Neocolpodes perpillus Basilewsky, 1970
- Neocolpodes perrinae Basilewsky, 1985
- Neocolpodes persimilis Basilewsky, 1985
- Neocolpodes peyrierasi Basilewsky, 1985
- Neocolpodes phaedroides (Alluaud, 1932)
- Neocolpodes phaedrus (Alluaud, 1932)
- Neocolpodes phenacoides (Jeannel, 1955)
- Neocolpodes plesioides Jeannel, 1948
- Neocolpodes plesius (Alluaud, 1932)
- Neocolpodes plumbeus Jeannel, 1951
- Neocolpodes porphyreticus (Alluaud, 1935)
- Neocolpodes porphyritis (Alluaud, 1935)
- Neocolpodes poussereaui Deuve, 2007
- Neocolpodes procletus Basilewsky, 1970
- Neocolpodes purpurascens Jeannel, 1951
- Neocolpodes purpureipennis Jeannel, 1948
- Neocolpodes radama (Alluaud, 1897)
- Neocolpodes ranavalonae (Alluaud, 1909)
- Neocolpodes raphideus Jeannel, 1948
- Neocolpodes rex Basilewsky, 1985
- Neocolpodes robinsoni Basilewsky, 1985
- Neocolpodes ruficollis Jeannel, 1948
- Neocolpodes rufofemoratus Basilewsky, 1985
- Neocolpodes rufomarginatus Basilewsky, 1985
- Neocolpodes sambavanus Basilewsky, 1985
- Neocolpodes sambiranus Basilewsky, 1985
- Neocolpodes saphyrinus Basilewsky, 1985
- Neocolpodes serpillus Basilewsky, 1985
- Neocolpodes seyrigi (Alluaud, 1935)
- Neocolpodes silvestris (Alluaud, 1935)
- Neocolpodes smaragdinus Basilewsky, 1985
- Neocolpodes straneoi Basilewsky, 1985
- Neocolpodes subimpressus (Alluaud, 1897)
- Neocolpodes sublaevis (Alluaud, 1909)
- Neocolpodes surdus Basilewsky, 1985
- Neocolpodes suturellus (Alluaud, 1897)
- Neocolpodes sylvaticus (Alluaud, 1897)
- Neocolpodes tanalensis Jeannel, 1948
- Neocolpodes tetragonus (Alluaud, 1932)
- Neocolpodes tetroxys (Alluaud, 1935)
- Neocolpodes tongobory Basilewsky, 1985
- Neocolpodes tsarabe Jeannel, 1948
- Neocolpodes tsaratananae (Jeannel, 1951)
- Neocolpodes turgidus Jeannel, 1948
- Neocolpodes vagus (Alluaud, 1899)
- Neocolpodes velitus Basilewsky, 1985
- Neocolpodes venustus Basilewsky, 1970
- Neocolpodes viettei (Jeannel, 1957)
- Neocolpodes villiersi Basilewsky, 1985
- Neocolpodes viridicollis Jeannel, 1951
- Neocolpodes wintreberti Basilewsky, 1985
- Neocolpodes xestus Basilewsky, 1985
