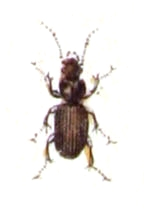
- Olisthopus rotundatus

Scientific classification
- Kingdom: Animalia
- Phylum: Arthropoda
- Class: Insecta
- Order: Coleoptera
- Suborder: Adephaga
- Family: Carabidae
- Subfamily: Platyninae
- Tribe: Platynini
- Subtribe: Platynina
- Genus: Olisthopus; Dejean, 1828

= Olisthopus =

Genus of beetles

Olisthopus is a genus of ground beetle native to the Palearctic (including Europe), the Near East and North Africa. It contains the following species:

- Olisthopus brevicornis Casey, 1913
- Olisthopus elburzensis (Morvan, 1977)
- Olisthopus elongatus Wollaston, 1854
- Olisthopus ericae Wollaston, 1854
- Olisthopus filicornis Casey, 1913
- Olisthopus fuscatus Dejean, 1828
- Olisthopus glabratus Brulle, 1839
- Olisthopus glabricollis (Germar, 1817)
- Olisthopus hispanicus Dejean, 1828
- Olisthopus humerosus Wollaston, 1858
- Olisthopus inclavatus Israelson, 1983
- Olisthopus innuens Casey, 1913
- Olisthopus iterans Casey, 1913
- Olisthopus maderensis Wollaston, 1854
- Olisthopus micans Leconte, 1848
- Olisthopus palmensis Wollaston, 1864
- Olisthopus parmatus (Say, 1823)
- Olisthopus pusio Casey, 1913
- Olisthopus rotundatus (Paykull, 1790)
- Olisthopus sibiricus J.Sahlberg, 1880
- Olisthopus sturmii (Duftschmid, 1812)
- Olisthopus yasujensis Azadbakhsh & Kirschenhofer, 2017
