= Metacolpodes =

Scientific classification
- Domain: Eukaryota
- Kingdom: Animalia
- Phylum: Arthropoda
- Class: Insecta
- Order: Coleoptera
- Suborder: Adephaga
- Family: Carabidae
- Subfamily: Platyninae
- Tribe: Platynini
- Genus: Metacolpodes; Jeannel, 1948

Genus of beetles

Metacolpodes is a genus of ground beetles in the family Carabidae. There are at least 30 described species in Metacolpodes.

== Species ==
These 30 species belong to the genus Metacolpodes:

- Metacolpodes amoenulus (Jedlicka, 1934) (Japan)
- Metacolpodes buchanani (Hope, 1831)
- Metacolpodes buchannani (Hope, 1831) (worldwide)
- Metacolpodes buxtoni (Andrewes, 1927) (Samoa)
- Metacolpodes cyaneus (Perroud, 1864) (New Caledonia)
- Metacolpodes deliasianum Morvan, 1999 (Myanmar)
- Metacolpodes fryi (Bates, 1889) (Borneo and Indonesia)
- Metacolpodes godavaricus (Kirschenhofer, 1992) (Nepal)
- Metacolpodes grandis (Landin, 1955) (Myanmar)
- Metacolpodes hardwickii (Hope, 1831) (India and Nepal)
- Metacolpodes hopkinsi (Andrewes, 1927) (Samoa)
- Metacolpodes janakpurensis (Kirschenhofer, 1992) (Nepal)
- Metacolpodes janelloides (Louwerens, 1953) (India)
- Metacolpodes janellus (Bates, 1892) (Myanmar)
- Metacolpodes laetus (Erichson, 1834) (worldwide)
- Metacolpodes landrungensis (Kirschenhofer, 1992) (Nepal)
- Metacolpodes laticeps (Emden, 1936) (Indonesia)
- Metacolpodes limodromoides (Bates, 1883) (Japan)
- Metacolpodes monticola (Fairmaire, 1849) (Tahiti)
- Metacolpodes nilgherriensis (Chaudoir, 1878) (India)
- Metacolpodes olivius (Bates, 1873) (worldwide)
- Metacolpodes parallelus (Chaudoir, 1859) (Indonesia and Malaysia)
- Metacolpodes planithorax (Louwerens, 1953) (India)
- Metacolpodes rambouseki (Jedlicka, 1934) (China)
- Metacolpodes rotundatus (Chaudoir, 1878) (India and Myanmar)
- Metacolpodes rotundicollis (Landin, 1955) (Myanmar)
- Metacolpodes superlita (Bates, 1888) (China)
- Metacolpodes takakuwai Morita, 2015 (Japan)
- Metacolpodes tetraglochis (Andrewes, 1929) (Indonesia, Malaysia, and Nepal)
- Metacolpodes truncatellus (Fairmaire, 1881) (worldwide)
