= Praepristus =

Scientific classification
- Domain: Eukaryota
- Kingdom: Animalia
- Phylum: Arthropoda
- Class: Insecta
- Order: Coleoptera
- Suborder: Adephaga
- Family: Carabidae
- Subfamily: Platyninae
- Tribe: Platynini
- Subtribe: Platynina
- Genus: Praepristus; Kirschenhofer, 1999

Genus of beetles

Praepristus is a genus of ground beetles in the family Carabidae. There are about 13 described species in Praepristus, found in Indomalaya.

== Species ==
These 13 species belong to the genus Praepristus:

- Praepristus borneensis Fedorenko, 2015 (Borneo, Indonesia, and Malaysia)
- Praepristus caviceps Fedorenko, 2015 (Vietnam)
- Praepristus depressus Fedorenko, 2015 (Vietnam)
- Praepristus foveiceps Fedorenko, 2015 (Vietnam)
- Praepristus grandis Fedorenko, 2015 (Vietnam)
- Praepristus kabakovi Fedorenko, 2015 (Vietnam)
- Praepristus nepalensis Kirschenhofer, 1999 (Nepal)
- Praepristus planus (Landin, 1955) (Myanmar)
- Praepristus rugifoveatus (Louwerens, 1955) (Borneo and Indonesia)
- Praepristus similis Fedorenko, 2015 (Vietnam)
- Praepristus sulcifer Fedorenko, 2015 (Vietnam)
- Praepristus testaceus Fedorenko, 2015 (Vietnam)
- Praepristus tonkinensis Fedorenko, 2015 (Vietnam)
