= Haplopeza =

Scientific classification
- Kingdom: Animalia
- Phylum: Arthropoda
- Class: Insecta
- Order: Coleoptera
- Suborder: Adephaga
- Family: Carabidae
- Subfamily: Platyninae
- Tribe: Platynini
- Subtribe: Platynina
- Genus: Haplopeza; Boheman, 1848

Genus of beetles

Haplopeza is a genus of beetles in the family Carabidae, containing the following species:

- Haplopeza bicolor Burgeon, 1937
- Haplopeza umtalia Barker, 1919
- Haplopeza violacea Boheman, 1848
