= Deltocolpodes =

Scientific classification
- Domain: Eukaryota
- Kingdom: Animalia
- Phylum: Arthropoda
- Class: Insecta
- Order: Coleoptera
- Suborder: Adephaga
- Family: Carabidae
- Subfamily: Platyninae
- Tribe: Platynini
- Subtribe: Platynina
- Genus: Deltocolpodes; Morvan, 1992

Genus of beetles

Deltocolpodes is a genus in the beetle family Carabidae. There are about 15 described species in Deltocolpodes.

== Species ==
These 15 species belong to the genus Deltocolpodes:

- Deltocolpodes bhutanensis Morvan, 2002 (Bhutan)
- Deltocolpodes brendelli Morvan, 1992 (Nepal)
- Deltocolpodes championi Morvan, 1992 (India)
- Deltocolpodes duluchus Morvan, 1992 (Nepal)
- Deltocolpodes heinigeri Morvan, 1992 (Nepal)
- Deltocolpodes holzschuhi Morvan, 2002 (Nepal)
- Deltocolpodes jalepensis Morvan, 1992 (India)
- Deltocolpodes kirschenhoferi Morvan, 1992 (Nepal)
- Deltocolpodes nepalensis Morvan, 1992 (Nepal)
- Deltocolpodes perreaui (Deuve, 1985) (Nepal)
- Deltocolpodes pierremorvani Deuve, 2006 (India)
- Deltocolpodes rectangulus Morvan, 1992 (Nepal)
- Deltocolpodes rolex Morvan, 1992 (Nepal)
- Deltocolpodes salpensis (Deuve, 1985) (Nepal)
- Deltocolpodes sikkimensis Morvan, 1992 (India)
