= Cardiomera =

Scientific classification
- Domain: Eukaryota
- Kingdom: Animalia
- Phylum: Arthropoda
- Class: Insecta
- Order: Coleoptera
- Suborder: Adephaga
- Family: Carabidae
- Subfamily: Platyninae
- Tribe: Platynini
- Subtribe: Platynina
- Genus: Cardiomera; Bassi, 1834
- Species: C. genei

Binomial name
- Cardiomera genei Bassi, 1834

Genus of beetles

Cardiomera genei is a species of beetle in the family Carabidae, the only species in the genus Cardiomera.
