= Cymenopterus =

Scientific classification
- Domain: Eukaryota
- Kingdom: Animalia
- Phylum: Arthropoda
- Class: Insecta
- Order: Coleoptera
- Suborder: Adephaga
- Family: Carabidae
- Subfamily: Platyninae
- Tribe: Platynini
- Subtribe: Platynina
- Genus: Cymenopterus; Jeannel, 1948

Genus of beetles

Cymenopterus is a genus of beetles in the family Carabidae, containing the following species:

- Cymenopterus perforatus (Alluaud, 1897)
- Cymenopterus vadoni (Jeannel, 1948)
