= Leptagonum =

Scientific classification
- Domain: Eukaryota
- Kingdom: Animalia
- Phylum: Arthropoda
- Class: Insecta
- Order: Coleoptera
- Suborder: Adephaga
- Family: Carabidae
- Subfamily: Platyninae
- Tribe: Platynini
- Subtribe: Platynina
- Genus: Leptagonum; Kolbe, 1897

Genus of beetles

Leptagonum is a genus of ground beetles in the family Carabidae. There are about 10 described species in Leptagonum, found in Africa.

== Species ==
These 10 species belong to the genus Leptagonum:

- Leptagonum allardi Basilewsky, 1959 (the Democratic Republic of the Congo)
- Leptagonum alternatum Burgeon, 1933 (the Democratic Republic of the Congo)
- Leptagonum elegans (Péringuey, 1904) (Zimbabwe)
- Leptagonum insignicorne (LaFerté-Sénectère, 1853) (worldwide)
- Leptagonum interstitiale Kolbe, 1897 (the Democratic Republic of the Congo and Tanzania)
- Leptagonum overlaeti Burgeon, 1933 (the Democratic Republic of the Congo)
- Leptagonum puncticeps Basilewsky, 1953 (the Democratic Republic of the Congo)
- Leptagonum schoutedeni Burgeon, 1933 (the Democratic Republic of the Congo)
- Leptagonum sparsepunctatum Basilewsky, 1953 (the Democratic Republic of the Congo)
- Leptagonum wittei Burgeon, 1933 (the Democratic Republic of the Congo)
