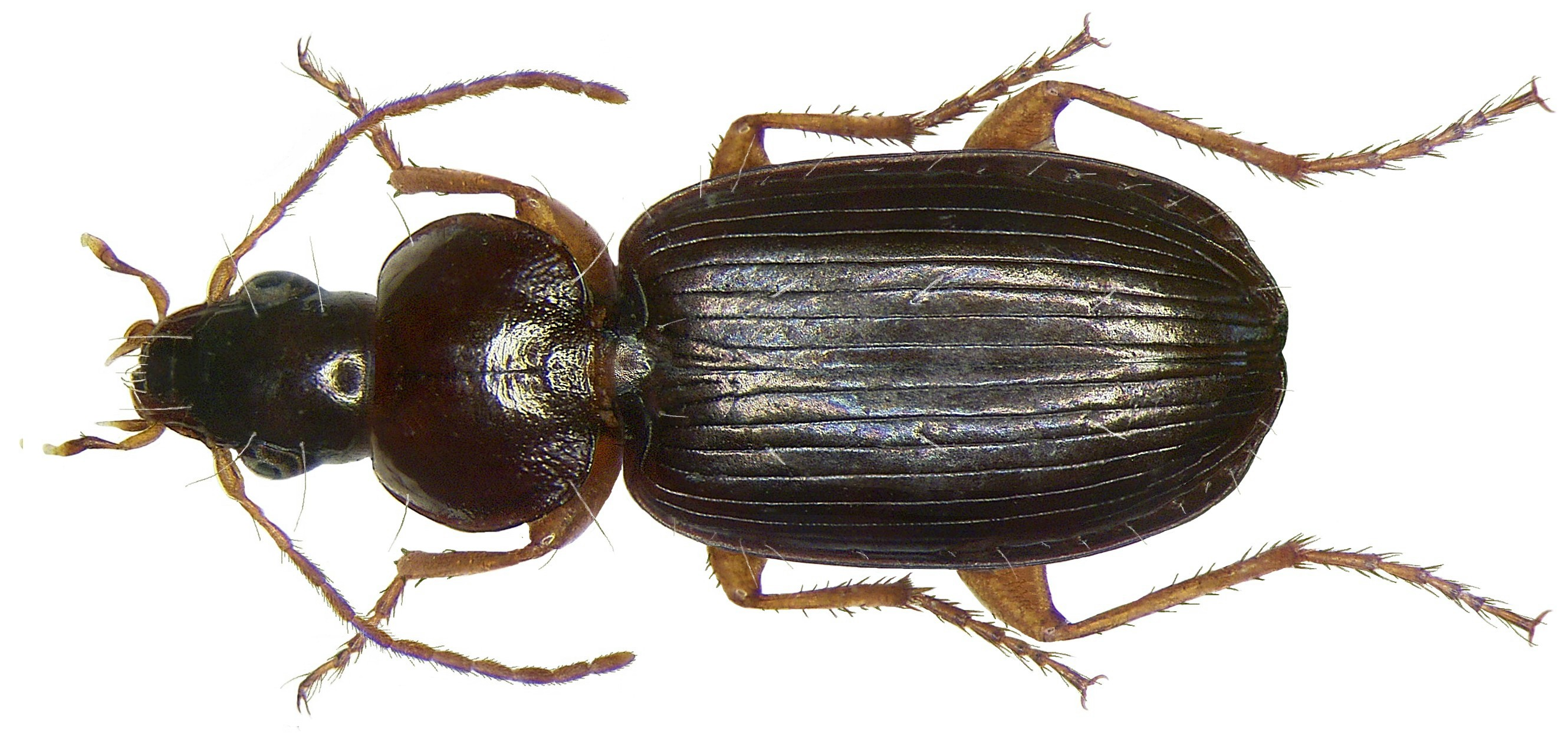

Scientific classification
- Kingdom: Animalia
- Phylum: Arthropoda
- Clade: Pancrustacea
- Class: Insecta
- Order: Coleoptera
- Suborder: Adephaga
- Family: Carabidae
- Genus: Olisthopus
- Species: O. rotundatus

Binomial name
- Olisthopus rotundatus (Paykull, 1798)

= Olisthopus rotundatus =

Species of beetle

Olisthopus rotundatus is a species of ground beetle native to Europe.
