= Trephionus bifidilobatus =

Scientific classification
- Domain: Eukaryota
- Kingdom: Animalia
- Phylum: Arthropoda
- Class: Insecta
- Order: Coleoptera
- Suborder: Adephaga
- Family: Carabidae
- Genus: Trephionus
- Species: T. bifidilobatus

Binomial name
- Trephionus bifidilobatus Sasakawa & Itô, 2018

Species of beetle

Trephionus bifidilobatus, is a species of beetle belonging to the family Carabidae. It is endemic to Japan.

== Etymology ==
The specific name bifidilobatus is due to bifid apex of the dorso-apical lobe.

== Description ==
Body length of male is about 8.2 mm. Head and pronotum black. Elytra reddish brown. Endophallus stout in shape. No hind wings. Dorso-apical lobe bifid at apex. Apex of aedeagus truncate.
