= Glyptolenus =

Scientific classification
- Domain: Eukaryota
- Kingdom: Animalia
- Phylum: Arthropoda
- Class: Insecta
- Order: Coleoptera
- Suborder: Adephaga
- Family: Carabidae
- Subfamily: Platyninae
- Tribe: Platynini
- Subtribe: Platynina
- Genus: Glyptolenus; Bates, 1878

Genus of beetles

Glyptolenus is a genus of beetles in the family Carabidae, containing the following species:

- Glyptolenus aereipennis (Chaudoir, 1850)
- Glyptolenus affinis (Chaudoir, 1879)
- Glyptolenus apicestriatus (Reiche, 1843)
- Glyptolenus ater (Chaudoir, 1859)
- Glyptolenus brevitarsis (Chaudoir, 1879)
- Glyptolenus chalybeus Dejean, 1831
- Glyptolenus convexiusculus (Chaudoir, 1879)
- Glyptolenus estebanensis Perrault, 1992
- Glyptolenus janthinus (Dejean, 1831)
- Glyptolenus latelytra (Darlington, 1935)
- Glyptolenus latitarsis Bates, 1884
- Glyptolenus mirabilis (Straneo, 1991)
- Glyptolenus negrei Perrault, 1991
- Glyptolenus nigrita (Chaudoir, 1879)
- Glyptolenus nitidipennis (Chaudoir, 1850)
- Glyptolenus rivalis (Chaudoir, 1879)
- Glyptolenus ruficollis (Chaudoir, 1879)
- Glyptolenus rugicollis Bates, 1878
- Glyptolenus simplicicollis Darlington, 1934
- Glyptolenus smithi Liebherr, 1997
- Glyptolenus spinosus (Reiche, 1843)
- Glyptolenus straneoi Will & Liebherr, 2002
- Glyptolenus transformatus Bates, 1882
