= Olisthopus parmatus =

Scientific classification
- Kingdom: Animalia
- Phylum: Arthropoda
- Class: Insecta
- Order: Coleoptera
- Suborder: Adephaga
- Family: Carabidae
- Genus: Olisthopus
- Species: O. parmatus

Binomial name
- Olisthopus parmatus (Say, 1823)

Species of beetle

Olisthopus parmatus is a species of ground beetle in the family Carabidae. It is found in North America.

== Subspecies ==
These two subspecies belong to the species Olisthopus parmatus:

- Olisthopus parmatus iterans Casey
- Olisthopus parmatus parmatus
