= Elliptoleus acutesculptus =

Scientific classification
- Domain: Eukaryota
- Kingdom: Animalia
- Phylum: Arthropoda
- Class: Insecta
- Order: Coleoptera
- Suborder: Adephaga
- Family: Carabidae
- Genus: Elliptoleus
- Species: E. acutesculptus

Binomial name
- Elliptoleus acutesculptus Bates, 1882

Species of beetle

Elliptoleus acutesculptus is a species of ground beetle in the family Carabidae. It is found in Central America and North America.
