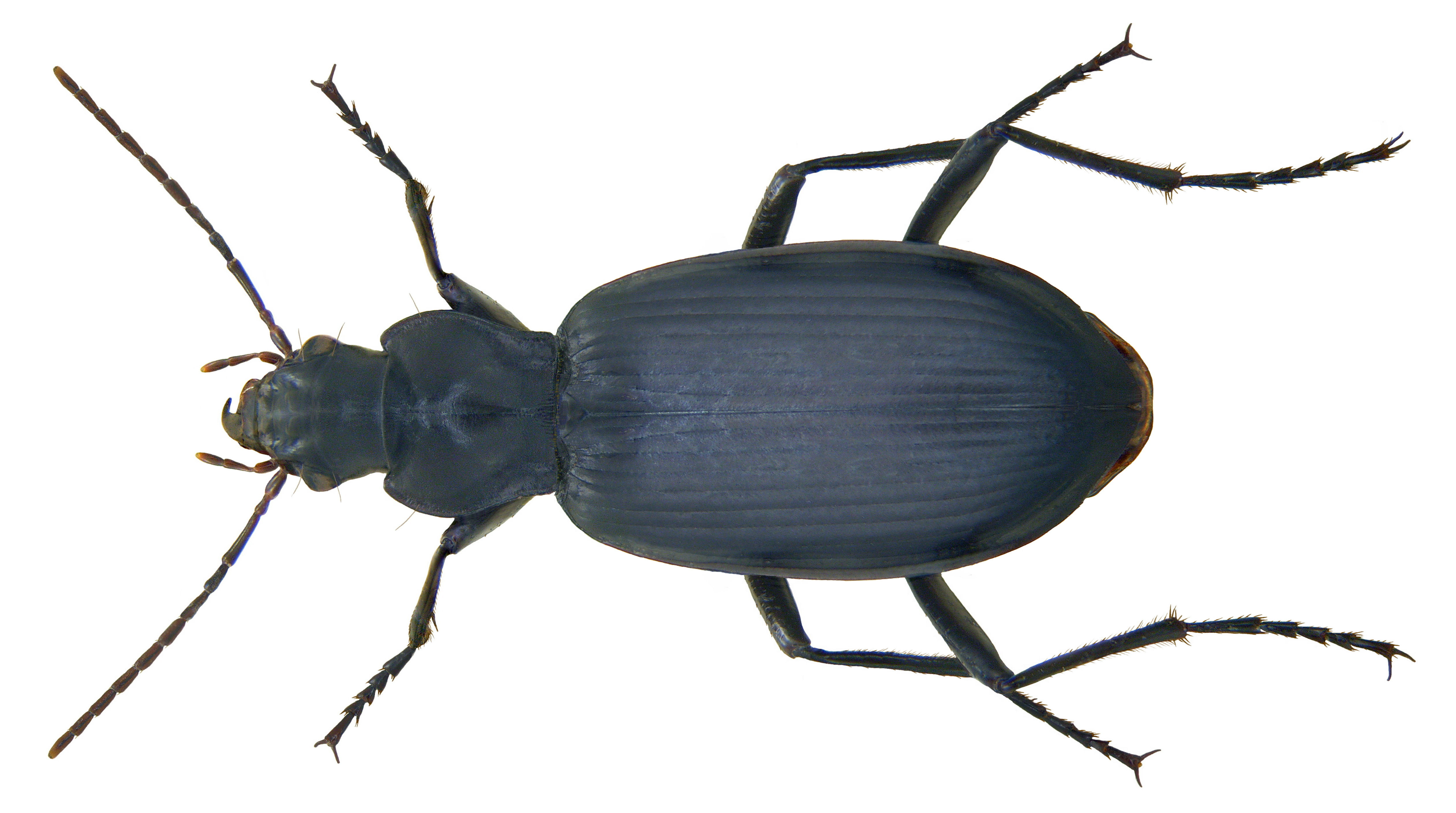

Scientific classification
- Kingdom: Animalia
- Phylum: Arthropoda
- Clade: Pancrustacea
- Class: Insecta
- Order: Coleoptera
- Suborder: Adephaga
- Family: Carabidae
- Genus: Sphodrus
- Species: S. leucophthalmus

Binomial name
- Sphodrus leucophthalmus (Linnaeus, 1758)

= Sphodrus leucophthalmus =

Species of beetle

Sphodrus leucophthalmus is a species of ground beetle native to Europe.
