= Trephionus kinoshitai =

Scientific classification
- Kingdom: Animalia
- Phylum: Arthropoda
- Class: Insecta
- Order: Coleoptera
- Suborder: Adephaga
- Family: Carabidae
- Genus: Trephionus
- Species: T. kinoshitai

Binomial name
- Trephionus kinoshitai Habu, 1954

Synonyms
- Synuchus nikkoensis kinoshitai Lindroth (1956)

Species of beetle

Trephionus kinoshitai is a species of beetle belonging to the family Carabidae. It is endemic to Japan.

== Description ==
Body length of male is about 8.7–10.2 mm, whereas female is 9.0 mm. Head and pronotum black. Elytra blackish brown to black. No hind wings. Dorso-apical lobe semi-ellipsoid. Apex of aedeagus rounded.
