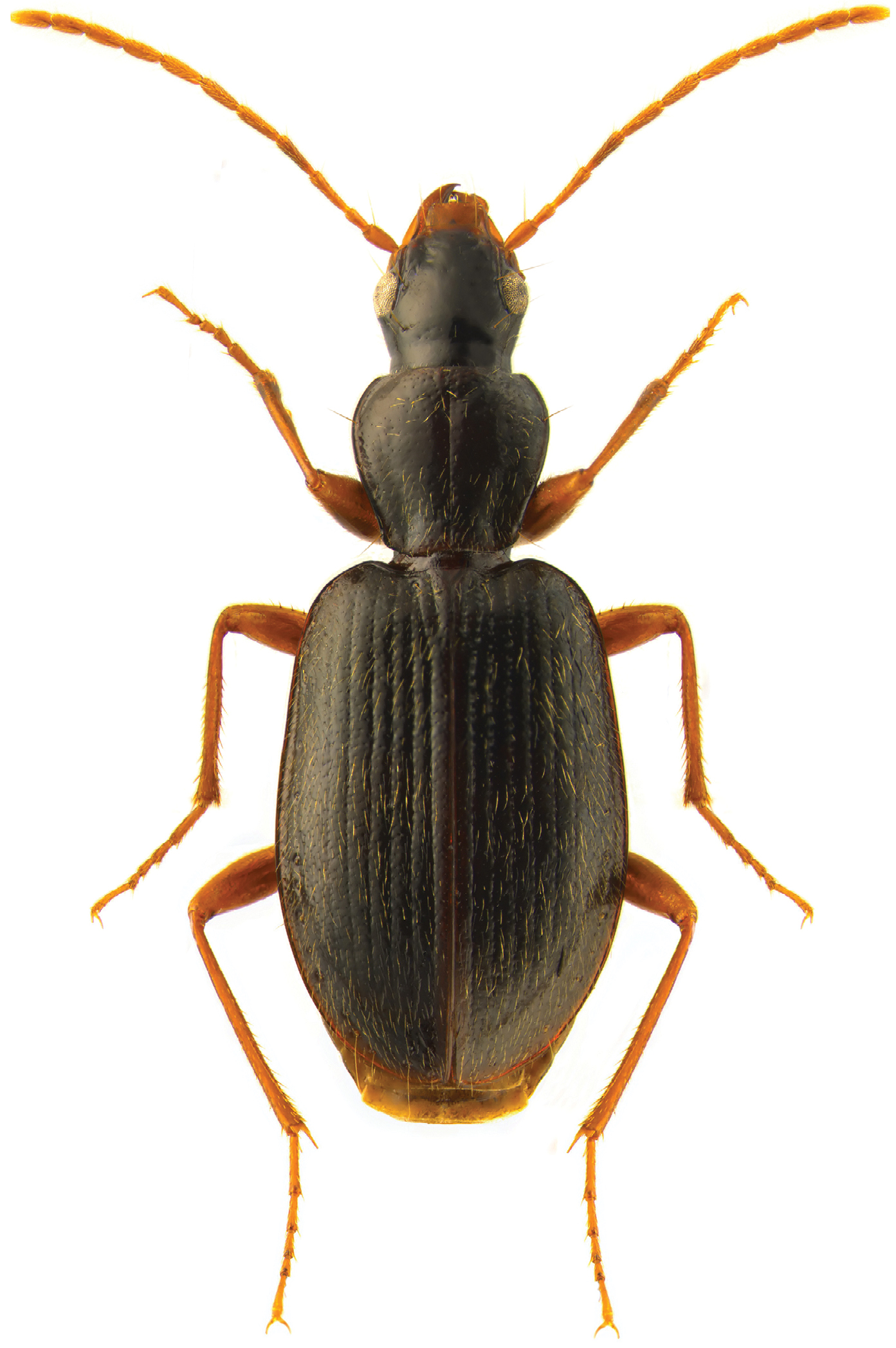

Scientific classification
- Kingdom: Animalia
- Phylum: Arthropoda
- Clade: Pancrustacea
- Class: Insecta
- Order: Coleoptera
- Suborder: Adephaga
- Family: Carabidae
- Tribe: Platynini
- Subtribe: Platynina
- Genus: Atranus
- Species: A. pubescens

Binomial name
- Atranus pubescens (Dejean, 1828)

= Atranus pubescens =

Species of beetle

Atranus pubescens is a species of ground beetle in the family Carabidae. It is found in North America.
