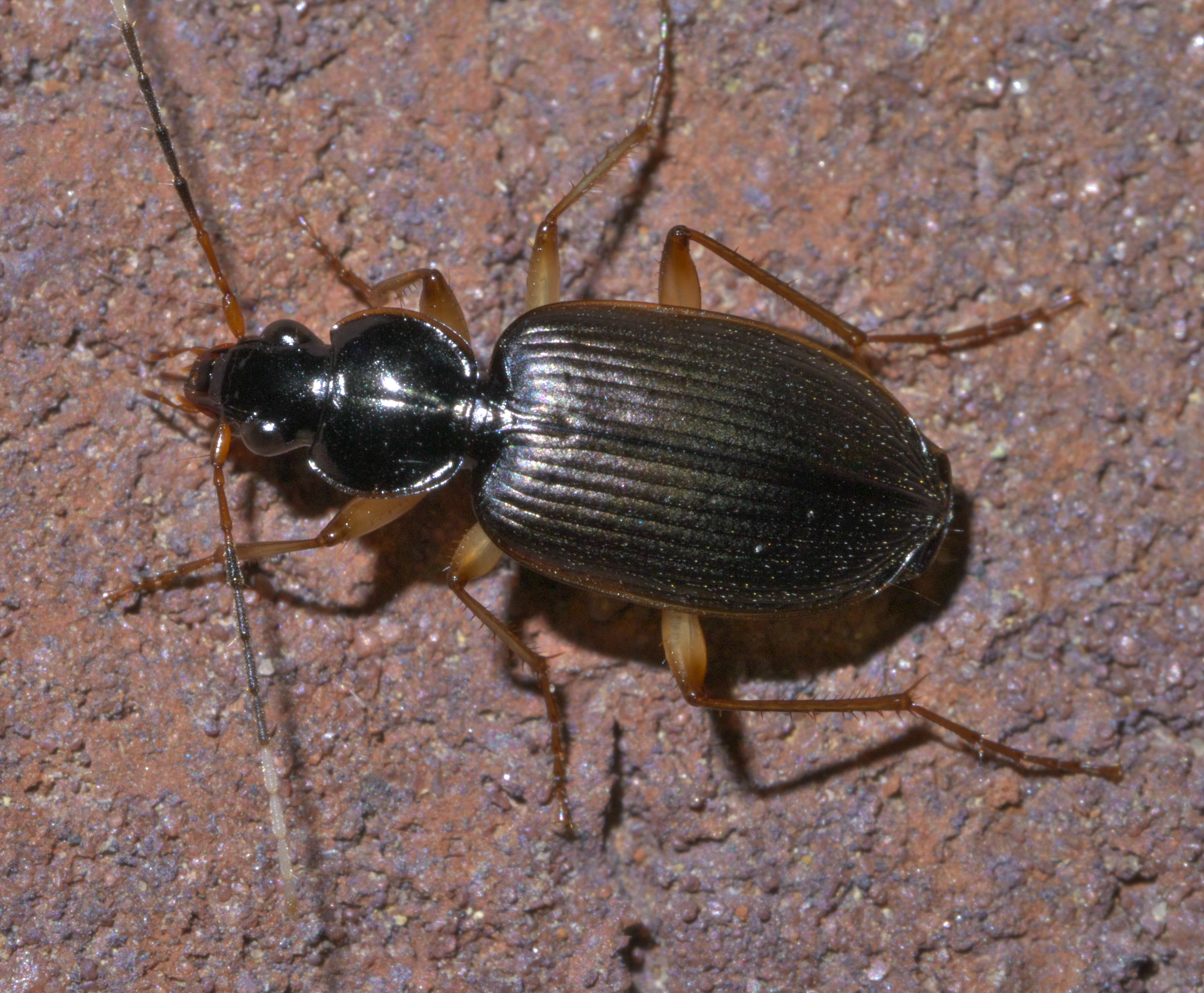
- Tetraleucus picticornis, Oklahoma

Scientific classification
- Kingdom: Animalia
- Phylum: Arthropoda
- Class: Insecta
- Order: Coleoptera
- Suborder: Adephaga
- Family: Carabidae
- Subfamily: Platyninae
- Tribe: Platynini
- Genus: Tetraleucus; Casey, 1920
- Species: T. picticornis

Binomial name
- Tetraleucus picticornis (Newman, 1844)

= Tetraleucus =

Genus of beetles

Tetraleucus is a genus of ground beetles in the family Carabidae. This genus has a single species, Tetraleucus picticornis. It is found in North America.
