= Agonobembix =

Agonobembix perrieri

Scientific classification
- Kingdom: Animalia
- Phylum: Arthropoda
- Class: Insecta
- Order: Coleoptera
- Suborder: Adephaga
- Family: Carabidae
- Subfamily: Platyninae
- Genus: Agonobembix; Jeannel, 1948
- Species: A. perrieri

Binomial name
- Agonobembix perrieri Jeannel, 1948

Genus of beetles

Agonobembix perrieri is a species of beetle in the family Carabidae, the only species in the genus Agonobembix.
