= Sphodropsis =

Scientific classification
- Domain: Eukaryota
- Kingdom: Animalia
- Phylum: Arthropoda
- Class: Insecta
- Order: Coleoptera
- Suborder: Adephaga
- Family: Carabidae
- Subfamily: Platyninae
- Tribe: Sphodrini
- Subtribe: Sphodrina
- Genus: Sphodropsis; Seidlitz, 1887

Genus of beetles

Sphodropsis is a genus of ground beetles in the family Carabidae. There are about 10 described species in Sphodropsis.

== Species ==
These 10 species belong to the genus Sphodropsis:

- Sphodropsis babusarensis Casale, 1988 (Pakistan)
- Sphodropsis deuvei Casale & Ledoux, 1996 (Afghanistan)
- Sphodropsis elegans Coiffait, 1962 (Afghanistan)
- Sphodropsis elongatula Casale, 1983 (Pakistan)
- Sphodropsis ghilianii (Schaum, 1858) (France and Italy)
- Sphodropsis heinzi Casale, 1982 (India)
- Sphodropsis nouristanensis Casale & Ledoux, 1996 (Afghanistan)
- Sphodropsis pakistana Casale, 1982 (Pakistan)
- Sphodropsis physignatha Andrewes, 1937 (India)
- Sphodropsis staveni Casale & Heinz, 2000 (Pakistan)
