= Trephionus niumontanus =

Scientific classification
- Domain: Eukaryota
- Kingdom: Animalia
- Phylum: Arthropoda
- Class: Insecta
- Order: Coleoptera
- Suborder: Adephaga
- Family: Carabidae
- Genus: Trephionus
- Species: T. niumontanus

Binomial name
- Trephionus niumontanus Sasakawa, 2018

Synonyms
- Trephionus kinoshitai Inoue (2013)

Species of beetle

Trephionus niumontanus is a species of beetle belonging to the family Carabidae. It is endemic to Japan.

== Taxonomy ==
Trephionus niumontanus was described by the entomologist Kôji Sasakawa in 2018 on the basis of an adult male specimen collected from Mount Kunimi in Fukui Prefecture, Japan. The specific epithet niumontanus refers to the Niu Mountains, where the species was discovered. The Japanese common name for the beetle is Inoue-hoso-hirata-gomimushi.

== Description ==
The body length of male is about 10.6 mm, whereas that of the female is around 10.9 mm. The dorsal surface is uniformly black. The lateral margins of the pronotum are distinctly sinuate before the hind angles. The first segments of the mid and hind tarsi are grooved on both sides, and the fifth segments bear two secondary setae dorsally.

The apex of the aedeagus is rounded. The endophallus is slender and exhibits a complex curvature: it is directed posterodorsally in the basal third, bends and points posteriorly in the middle third, and then bends again to point right-laterally in the apical third. The gonopore opens toward the right-anterolateral direction. Notably, the dorsobasal and both laterobasal lobes are absent. The dorsoapical lobe is narrowly swollen, with a basal diameter about half the width of the aedeagus. The sclerotized lobe is less hardened than the aedeagus, and the sclerotized rim of the gonopore is indistinct.

Trephionus niumontanus resembles T. kinoshitai and T. cylindriphallus in having secondary setae on the dorsal side of the mid and hind tarsal segment 5, but distinguished by its larger body.

== Distribution ==
It is endemic to Japan and is known only from Mount Kunimi in Fukui Prefecture, where it was collected at an elevation of 480 m (1,570 ft).
