= Takasagoagonum =

Scientific classification
- Kingdom: Animalia
- Phylum: Arthropoda
- Class: Insecta
- Order: Coleoptera
- Suborder: Adephaga
- Family: Carabidae
- Subfamily: Platyninae
- Tribe: Platynini
- Subtribe: Platynina
- Genus: Takasagoagonum; Habu, 1977
- Species: T. scotus

Binomial name
- Takasagoagonum scotus Habu, 1977

Genus of beetles

Takasagoagonum is a genus of ground beetles in the family Carabidae. This genus has a single species, Takasagoagonum scotus. It is found in Taiwan and temperate Asia.
