= Trephionus inexpectatus =

Scientific classification
- Domain: Eukaryota
- Kingdom: Animalia
- Phylum: Arthropoda
- Class: Insecta
- Order: Coleoptera
- Suborder: Adephaga
- Family: Carabidae
- Genus: Trephionus
- Species: T. inexpectatus

Binomial name
- Trephionus inexpectatus Sasakawa & Itô, 2018

Species of beetle

Trephionus inexpectatus is a species of beetle belonging to the family Carabidae. It is endemic to Japan.

== Taxonomy ==
Trephionus inexpectatus was described by the entomologist Kôji Sasakawa in 2018 on the basis of an adult male specimen collected from Kitazawa Pass in Nagano Prefecture, Japan. The specific epithet inexpectatus refers to the unexpected nature of this species' discovery, as it is similar in appearance to other species with simple aedeagus apexes, despite having a truncate apex itself. The Japanese common name for the beetle is Akaishi-hoso-hirata-gomimushi.

== Description ==
The body length of male is about 8.8 mm. The dorsal surface of the body is black. The lateral margins of the pronotum are slightly sinuate just before the hind angles. The first segment of the mid tarsus is grooved on both sides, while the first segment of the hind tarsus is grooved only on the outer side and not on the inner side. Notably, the fifth segments of both the mid and hind tarsi lack secondary setae on the dorsal surface.

The apex of the aedeagus is truncate. The endophallus is stout, nearly straight, and directed posterodorsally. The gonopore opens toward the right-dorsoposterolateral direction. The dorsobasal lobe is broadly swollen, with its basal diameter slightly less than half the width of the aedeagus. Both laterobasal lobes are absent. The dorsoapical lobe is conical in shape, broadly rounded at the tip, with a basal diameter greater than half but less than the full width of the aedeagus. The sclerotized lobe is equally hardened as the aedeagus, and the anteroposterior length of the sclerotized rim of the gonopore matches the proximodistal length of the sclerotized lobe.

Trephionus inexpectatus can easily be differentiated from T. subcavicola by the absence of the inner sulcus of the hind tarsal segment 5. Compared to other species with truncate aedeagus tips, it has a larger body and more blackish dorsal surface.

== Distribution ==
Trephionus inexpectatus is endemic to Japan and is known only from Kitazawa Pass, near the village of Hase, in Nagano Prefecture, where it was collected at an elevation of approximately 2,000 m (6,600 ft).
