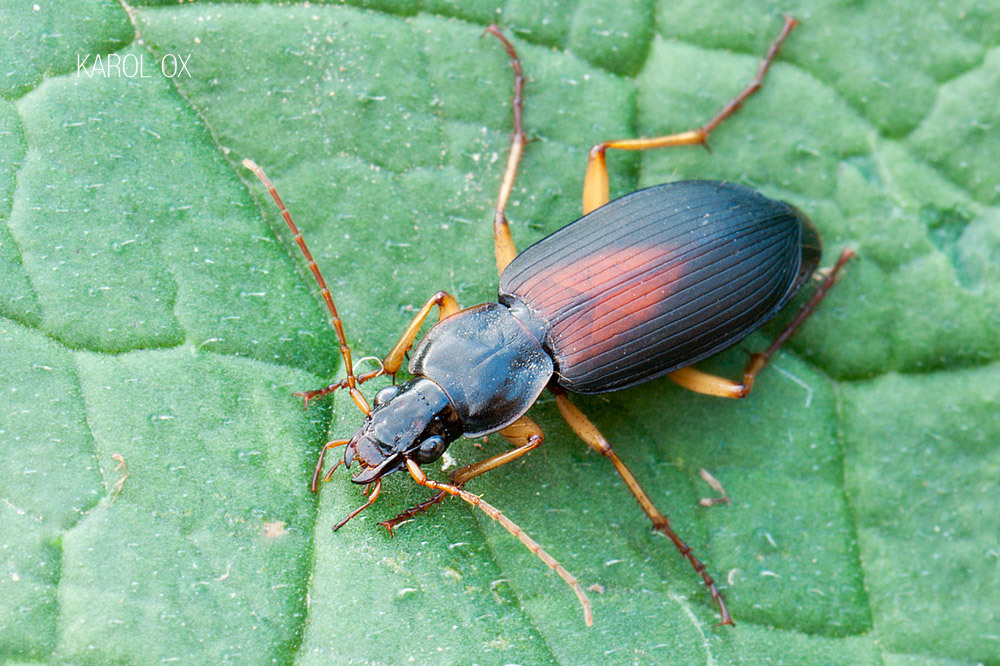
- Dolichus halensis, Slovakia

Scientific classification
- Domain: Eukaryota
- Kingdom: Animalia
- Phylum: Arthropoda
- Class: Insecta
- Order: Coleoptera
- Suborder: Adephaga
- Family: Carabidae
- Subfamily: Platyninae
- Tribe: Sphodrini
- Subtribe: Dolichina
- Genus: Dolichus; Bonelli, 1810

= Dolichus (beetle) =

Genus of beetles

Dolichus is a genus of beetles in the family Carabidae, containing the following species:

- Dolichus davidis Fairmaire, 1889
- Dolichus halensis Schaller, 1783

Dolichus halensis is found across temperate Europe and Asia, and Dolichus davidis is found in China.
