= Bruskmoal =

Scientific classification
- Domain: Eukaryota
- Kingdom: Animalia
- Phylum: Arthropoda
- Class: Insecta
- Order: Coleoptera
- Suborder: Adephaga
- Family: Carabidae
- Subfamily: Platyninae
- Tribe: Platynini
- Subtribe: Platynina
- Genus: Bruskmoal; Morvan, 1998
- Species: B. bresk

Binomial name
- Bruskmoal bresk Morvan, 1998

Genus of beetles

Bruskmoal bresk is a species of beetle in the family Carabidae, the only species in the genus Bruskmoal.
