= Trephionus cylindriphallus =

Scientific classification
- Domain: Eukaryota
- Kingdom: Animalia
- Phylum: Arthropoda
- Class: Insecta
- Order: Coleoptera
- Suborder: Adephaga
- Family: Carabidae
- Genus: Trephionus
- Species: T. cylindriphallus

Binomial name
- Trephionus cylindriphallus Sasakawa, 2018

Species of beetle

Trephionus cylindriphallus is a species of beetle belonging to the family Carabidae. It is endemic to Japan.

== Taxonomy ==
Trephionus cylindriphallus was described by the entomologist Kôji Sasakawa in 2018 on the basis of an adult male specimen collected in University of Tokyo Chichibu Forest in Saitama Prefecture, Japan. The specific epithet cylindriphallus refers to the robust, cylindrical shape of the endophallus. The Japanese common name for the beetle is Chichibu-hoso-hirata-gomimushi.

== Description ==
The body length of male is about 8.9–9.8 mm, whereas that of the female is 8.2–10.0 mm. The dorsal surface is dark brown to black in color. The lateral margins of the pronotum, just before the hind angles, are only slightly curved inward. The first segments of the mid and hind tarsi are grooved on both sides, and the fifth segment bears two small setae on the dorsal side.

In males, the aedeagus has a rounded tip, and the endophallus is thick, nearly straight, and directed toward the rear. The gonopore opens toward the upper right side. The dorsobasal lobe is only slightly swollen, while the right laterobasal lobe is broadly swollen, with its basal diameter equal to the width of the aedeagus. The left laterobasal lobe is absent. The dorsoapical lobe is semi-ellipsoid in shape, with a basal diameter less than half the width of the aedeagus. The sclerotized lobe is less hardened than the aedeagus, and the front-to-back length of the sclerotized rim of the gonopore is equal to the top-to-bottom length of the sclerotized lobe.

Trephionus cylindriphallus resembles T. kinoshitai and T. niumontanus in having secondary setae on the dorsal side of the mid and hind tarsal segment 5, but is distinguished from kinoshitai by the slightly curved lateral margin of pronotum near base, and from niumontanus by its smaller body.
