= Rupa (beetle) =

Scientific classification
- Kingdom: Animalia
- Phylum: Arthropoda
- Class: Insecta
- Order: Coleoptera
- Suborder: Adephaga
- Family: Carabidae
- Subfamily: Platyninae
- Genus: Reepa; Jedlicka, 1935

Genus of beetles

Rupa is a genus of beetles in the family Carabidae, containing the following species:

- Rupa japonica Jedlicka, 1935
- Rupa uncinata Kasahara, 1994
- Rupa uenoi Habu, 1976
