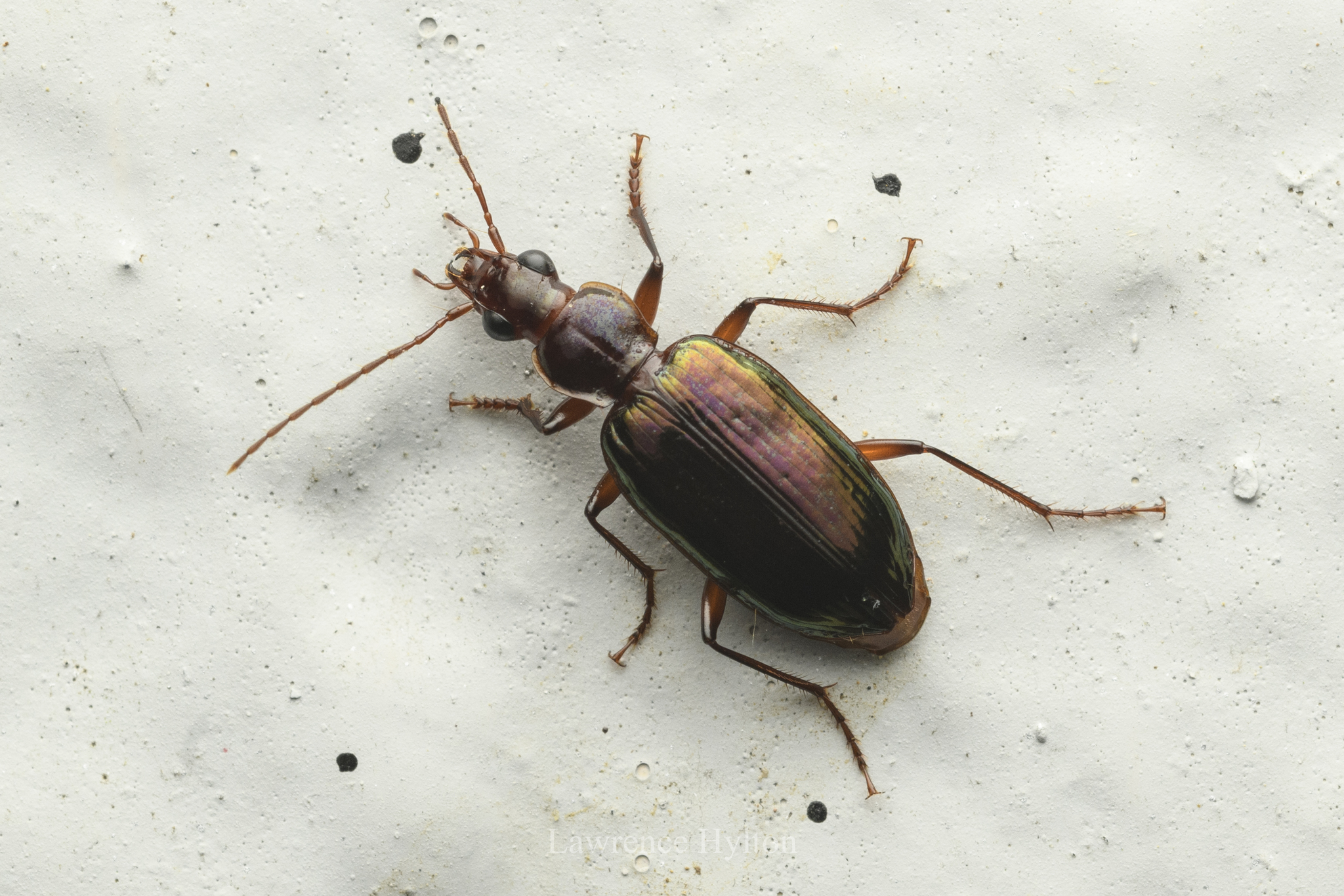

Scientific classification
- Domain: Eukaryota
- Kingdom: Animalia
- Phylum: Arthropoda
- Class: Insecta
- Order: Coleoptera
- Suborder: Adephaga
- Family: Carabidae
- Genus: Metacolpodes
- Species: M. buchanani

Binomial name
- Metacolpodes buchanani (Hope, 1831)

= Metacolpodes buchanani =

Species of beetle

Metacolpodes buchanani is a species of ground beetle in the family Carabidae.
