= Chaetosaurus =

Scientific classification
- Domain: Eukaryota
- Kingdom: Animalia
- Phylum: Arthropoda
- Class: Insecta
- Order: Coleoptera
- Suborder: Adephaga
- Family: Carabidae
- Subfamily: Platyninae
- Tribe: Platynini
- Subtribe: Platynina
- Genus: Chaetosaurus; J.Schmidt, 2001
- Species: C. emeishanicola

Binomial name
- Chaetosaurus emeishanicola J.Schmidt, 2001

Genus of beetles

Chaetosaurus emeishanicola is a species of beetle in the family Carabidae, the only species in the genus Chaetosaurus.
