= Olisthopus micans =

Scientific classification
- Kingdom: Animalia
- Phylum: Arthropoda
- Class: Insecta
- Order: Coleoptera
- Suborder: Adephaga
- Family: Carabidae
- Genus: Olisthopus
- Species: O. micans

Binomial name
- Olisthopus micans LeConte, 1846

Species of beetle

Olisthopus micans is a species of ground beetle in the family Carabidae. It is found in North America.
