= Kaszabellus =

Scientific classification
- Domain: Eukaryota
- Kingdom: Animalia
- Phylum: Arthropoda
- Class: Insecta
- Order: Coleoptera
- Suborder: Adephaga
- Family: Carabidae
- Subfamily: Platyninae
- Tribe: Platynini
- Subtribe: Platynina
- Genus: Kaszabellus; Jedlicka, 1954
- Species: K. formosanus

Binomial name
- Kaszabellus formosanus Jedlicka, 1954

Genus of beetles

Kaszabellus is a genus of ground beetles in the family Carabidae. This genus has a single species, Kaszabellus formosanus. It is found in Taiwan and temperate Asia.
