= Abacetodes =

Scientific classification
- Domain: Eukaryota
- Kingdom: Animalia
- Phylum: Arthropoda
- Class: Insecta
- Order: Coleoptera
- Suborder: Adephaga
- Family: Carabidae
- Tribe: Platynini
- Subtribe: Enoicina
- Genus: Abacetodes; Straneo, 1939

Genus of beetles

Abacetodes is a genus of beetles in the family Carabidae, containing the following species As of 2016:

- Abecetodes gilvipes (Boheman, 1848)
- Abecetodes harpaloides (Peringuey, 1896)
- Abecetodes mauroaeneus (Motschulsky, 1864)
- Abecetodes nanniscus (Peringuey, 1896)
