= Elliptoleus =

Scientific classification
- Kingdom: Animalia
- Phylum: Arthropoda
- Class: Insecta
- Order: Coleoptera
- Suborder: Adephaga
- Family: Carabidae
- Tribe: Platynini
- Genus: Elliptoleus; Bates, 1882

Genus of beetles

Elliptoleus is a genus of beetles in the family Carabidae, containing the following species:

- Elliptoleus acutesculptus Bates, 1882
- Elliptoleus balli Liebherr, 1991
- Elliptoleus corvus Liebherr, 1991
- Elliptoleus crepericornis Bates, 1882
- Elliptoleus curtulus Bates, 1882
- Elliptoleus luteipes Csiki, 1931
- Elliptoleus olisthopoides Bates, 1891
- Elliptoleus tequilae Liebherr, 1991
- Elliptoleus vixstriatus (Bates, 1878)
- Elliptoleus whiteheadi Liebherr, 1991
- Elliptoleus zapotecorum Liebherr, 1991
