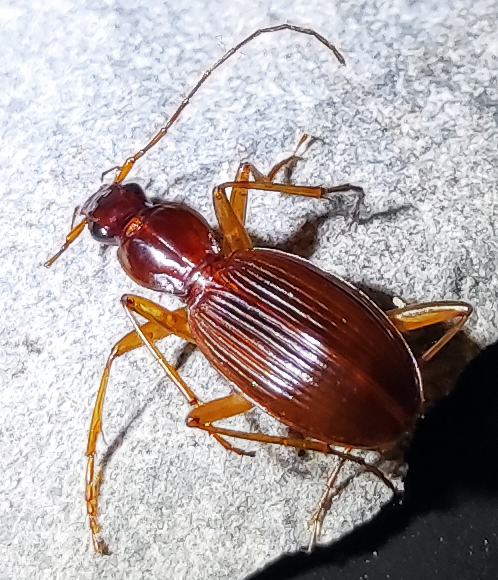

Conservation status
- Critically Endangered (IUCN 3.1)

Scientific classification
- Kingdom: Animalia
- Phylum: Arthropoda
- Class: Insecta
- Order: Coleoptera
- Suborder: Adephaga
- Family: Carabidae
- Genus: Pseudanchomenus; Tarnier, 1860
- Species: P. aptinoides

Binomial name
- Pseudanchomenus aptinoides (Tarnier, 1860)

= Pseudanchomenus =

Species of beetle

Pseudanchomenus is a beetle genus in the family of ground beetles (Carabidae). Its only described species, Pseudanchomenus aptinoides, is endemic to the Azores archipelago.

== Description and ecology ==
The beetle is approximately 12 mm long, its antennae reach almost 3/4 of its body size.

It lives high in mountains between 800 and 1200 m in native forests dominated by Juniperus brevifolia woodland (as in Caveiro, Achada Plateau, Pico island) and on lavic formations dominated by Erica azorica. It is a nocturnal predator that lives in very humid pristine native forest and can be found on the tree trunks and in the soil, particularly in ravines. The beetle is most active from June to October and breeds in autumn.

== Distribution ==
P. aptinoides is endemic to Pico and São Miguel islands in Azores, but it is now considered extinct on São Miguel. The species have been found in Natural Forest Reserves of Caveiro, Lagoa do Caiado and Mistério da Prainha in Pico island, and it was last found before 90s in Furnas in S. Miguel island.

== Conservation status ==
P. aptinoides is considered as Critically Endangered species according to IUCN Red List. It is threatened because of major land-use changes and invasions of non-native plants, especially Hedychium gardnerianum. The alterations in the structure of the forest impact the cover of bryophytes and ferns in the soil, which has negative effects on the species. It is also threatened because of its large body size.

Degraded habitats should be restored, expanded and the habitat fragments should be linked. It is also necessary to remove invasive non-native species where this is possible. Formal education and awareness is needed to allow future investments in restored habitats invaded by invasive plants. Further research is needed into its ecology and life history to perform a species potential recovery plan.

Currently, on the scope of LIFE Programme (Life Beetles), awareness is being risen among local people and visitants about the beetle and following conservation actions are carried out:

- Regular monitoring; effective and early removal of possible outbreaks of invasive flora species, such as Ginger lily (Hedychium gardnerianum);
- Convert pasture lands, planting endemic species and dispersing native fern spores;
- Exclusion of cattle, with the placement of fences at critical entrances, where cattle have more access;
- Maintain the quality of habitat available for the species Pseudanchomenus aptinoides and other native arthropods.
- Implement Nature Based Solutions (NBS) in order to increase the potential of water retention and provision of ecosystem services to the community.
