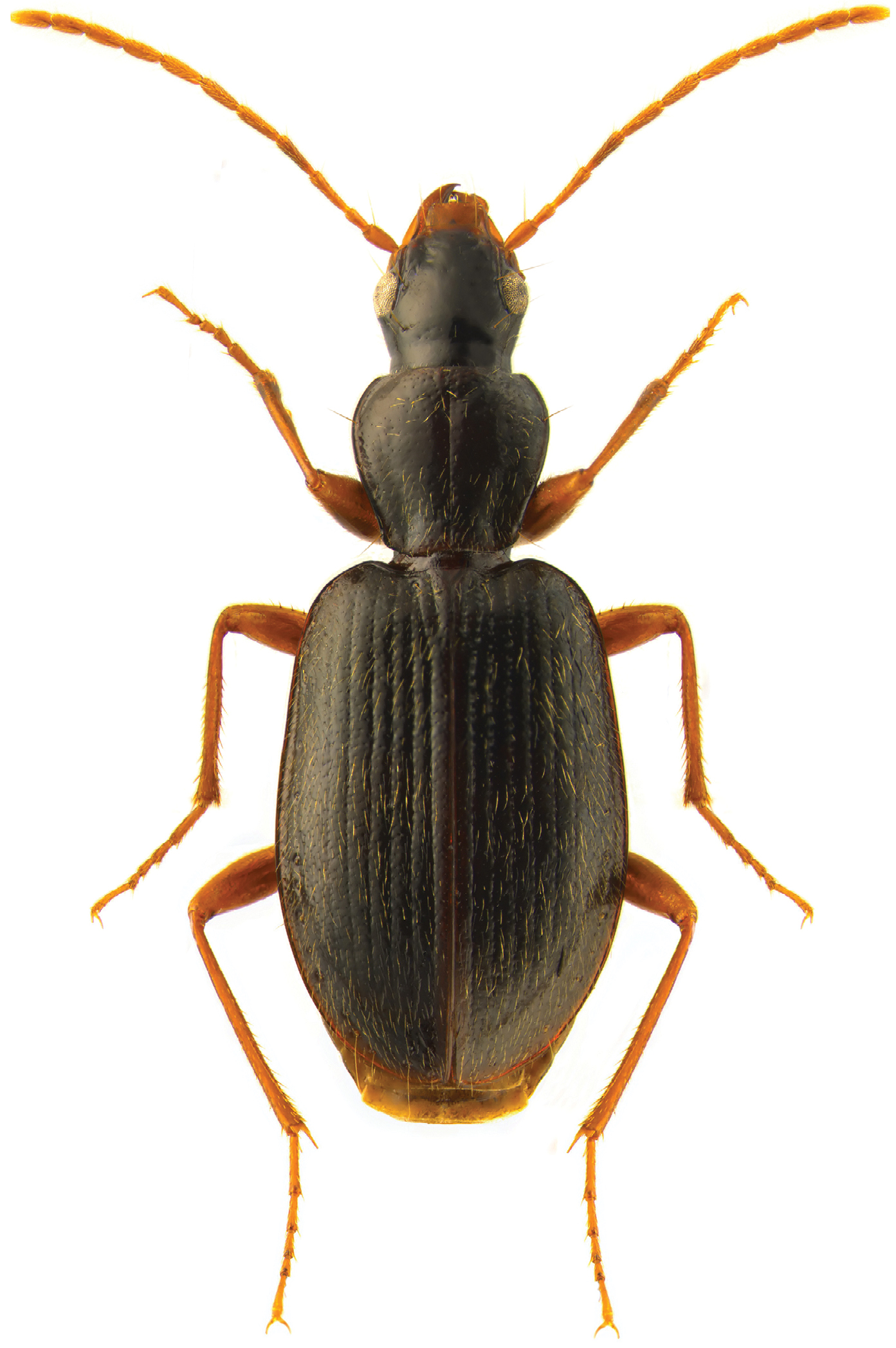
- Atranus pubescens

Scientific classification
- Kingdom: Animalia
- Phylum: Arthropoda
- Class: Insecta
- Order: Coleoptera
- Suborder: Adephaga
- Family: Carabidae
- Subtribe: Platynina
- Genus: Atranus; LeConte, 1848

= Atranus =

Genus of beetles

Atranus is a genus of beetles in the family Carabidae, containing the following species:

- Atranus pubescens (Dejean, 1828)
- Atranus ruficollis Gautier des Cottes, 1858
