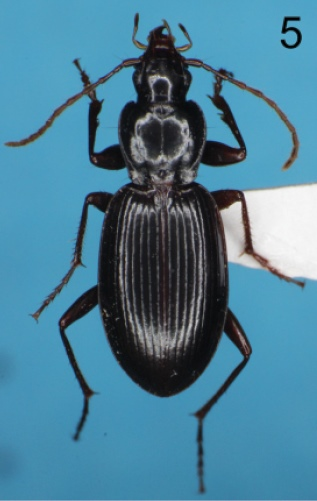

Scientific classification
- Kingdom: Animalia
- Phylum: Arthropoda
- Class: Insecta
- Order: Coleoptera
- Suborder: Adephaga
- Family: Carabidae
- Genus: Trephionus
- Species: T. babai

Binomial name
- Trephionus babai Habu, 1978

Synonyms
- Synuchus nikkoensis kinoshitai Lindroth (1956)

= Trephionus babai =

Species of beetle

Trephionus babai, is a species of beetle belonging to the family Carabidae. It is endemic to Japan.

== Description ==
Body length of male is about 9.3 mm, whereas female is 9.8–10.3 mm. Dorsal surface black. Endophallus long oval. No hind wings. Dorso-apical lobe narrowly swollen. Apex of aedeagus rounded.
