= Omphreus =

Scientific classification
- Kingdom: Animalia
- Phylum: Arthropoda
- Class: Insecta
- Order: Coleoptera
- Suborder: Adephaga
- Family: Carabidae
- Tribe: Omphreini
- Genus: Omphreus; Bonelli, 1810

Genus of beetles

Omphreus is a genus of beetles in the family Carabidae, containing the following species:

- Omphreus adriaenssensi Lassalle, 1998
- Omphreus aetolicus Apfelbeck, 1904
- Omphreus apfelbecki Reitter, 1893
- Omphreus bischoffi Meschnigg, 1934
- Omphreus bjelasicensis Curcic, 2008
- Omphreus chareti Lassalle, 1995
- Omphreus gracilis Apfelbeck, 1918
- Omphreus korbi Ganglbauer, 1887
- Omphreus krueperi Reitter, 1885
- Omphreus lonai Winkler, 1933
- Omphreus morio Dejean, 1828
- Omphreus ovcarensis Curcic et al., 2008
- Omphreus prekornicensis Curcic, 2008
- Omphreus prunierorum Lassalle, 1998
- Omphreus revasinii J. Muller, 1923
- Omphreus serbooccidentalis Curcic et al., 2008
- Omphreus weiratheri Winkler, 1933
- Omphreus wohlberedti Winkler, 1933
