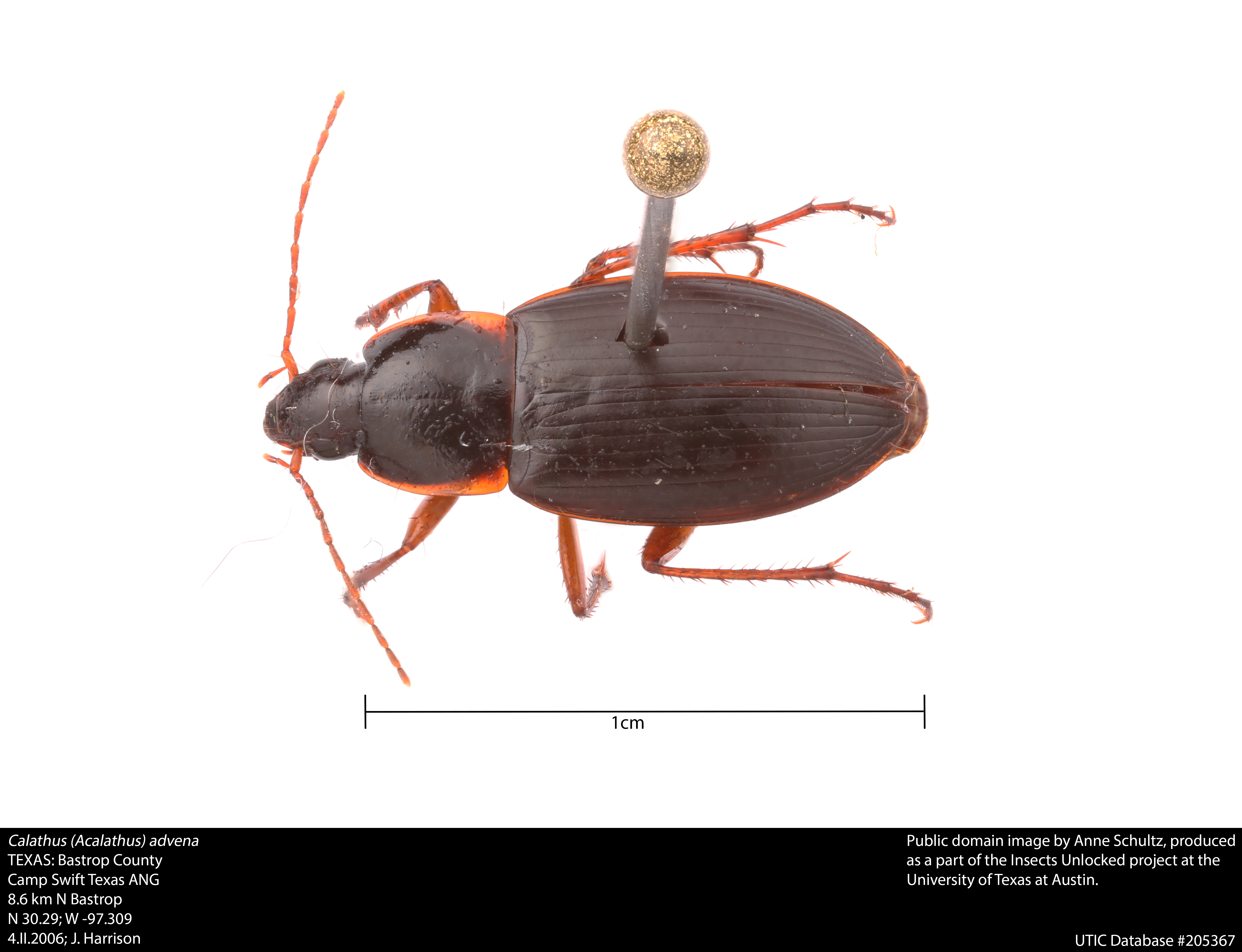
- Calathus advena

Scientific classification
- Domain: Eukaryota
- Kingdom: Animalia
- Phylum: Arthropoda
- Class: Insecta
- Order: Coleoptera
- Suborder: Adephaga
- Family: Carabidae
- Subfamily: Platyninae
- Tribe: Sphodrini; Laporte, 1834

Subtribes
- Atranopsina Baehr, 1982; Calathina Laporte, 1834; Dolichina Brullé, 1834; Pristosiina Lindroth, 1956; Sphodrina Laporte, 1834; Synuchina Lindroth, 1956

= Sphodrini =

Tribe of ground beetles

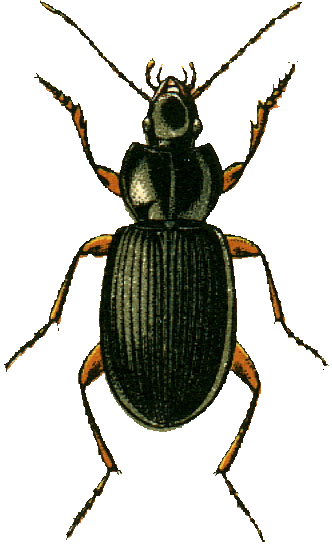
Synuchus vivalis

Sphodrini is a tribe of ground beetles in the family Carabidae. There are more than 30 genera and at least 910 described species in Sphodrini.

== See also ==
For a list of Sphodrini genera, see Platyninae.
