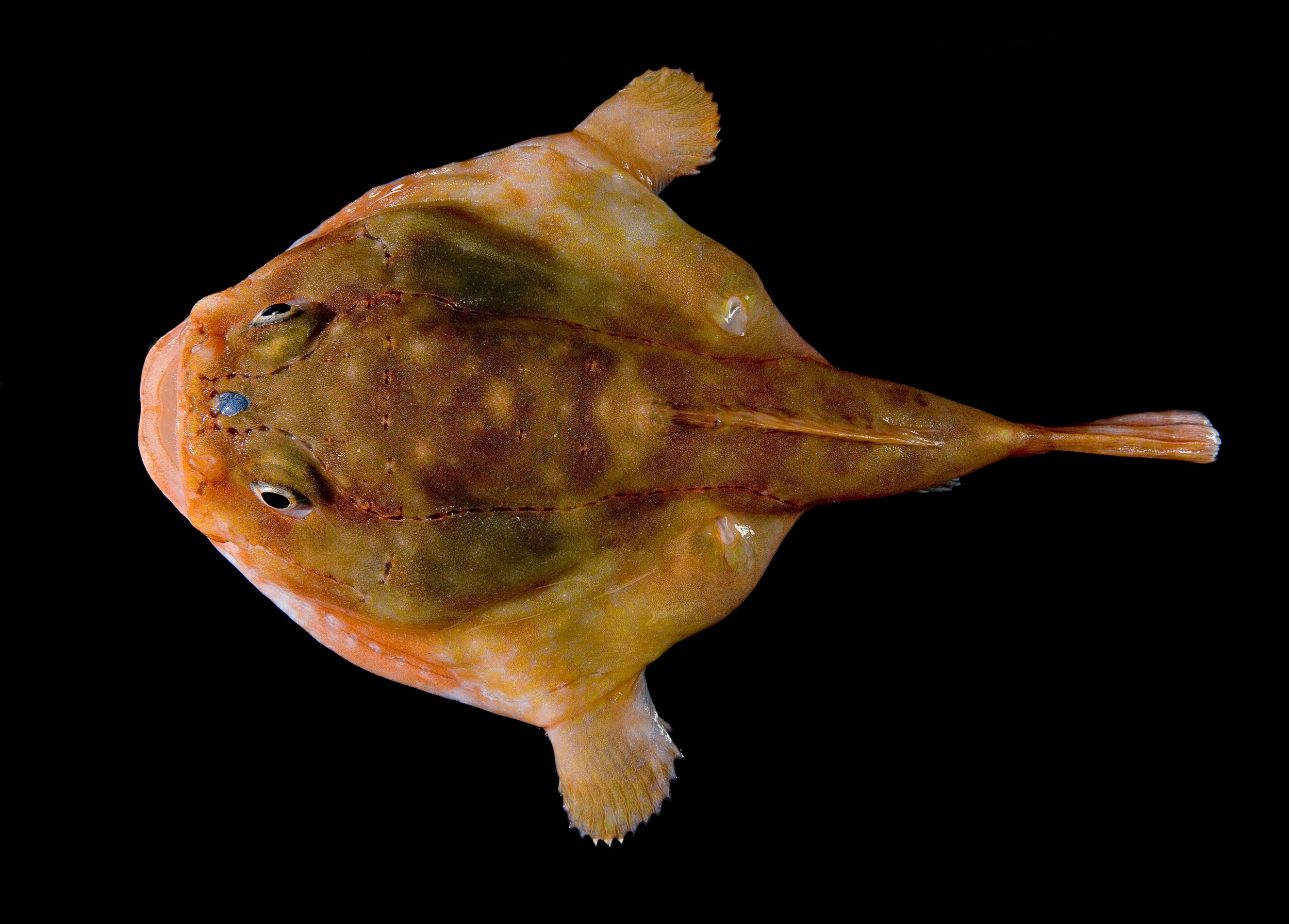

Conservation status
- Data Deficient (IUCN 3.1)

Scientific classification
- Kingdom: Animalia
- Phylum: Chordata
- Class: Actinopterygii
- Order: Lophiiformes
- Family: Chaunacidae
- Genus: Chaunax
- Species: C. stigmaeus

Binomial name
- Chaunax stigmaeus Fowler, 1946

= Redeye gaper =

Species of fish

The redeye gaper, Chaunax stigmaeus, is a sedentary species of anglerfish in the family Chaunacidae. It is native to deep waters in the western North Atlantic from the Georges Bank off New England southward to the Blake Plateau off South Carolina. The species is found on the outer continental shelf and upper continental slope at a depth of 90–730 m and among dense beds of dead coral (Lophelia pertusa) rubble, their preferred habitat. The original type specimen was caught in a trawl off Atlantic City on March 1, 1946, and donated to the Academy of Natural Sciences by Carroll B. Atkinson. The name stigmaeus means "speckled" in Greek. This species is a member of the C. pictus species complex.

The redeye gaper has a rounded, slightly compressed body and a very large head. The mouth is large, with a protruding lower jaw and teeth arranged in bands. The skin is soft, loose, and very pliable (especially on the underside), forming folds over much of the head and body. The fish is covered with minute spinules that give it a velvety texture. The lateral line system has prominent open canals. The pectoral fins are small, with 14 fin rays. The first dorsal fin ray is modified into an angling apparatus (the illicium) with a lure (the esca). The esca consists of a cluster of filaments of varying thickness and is black to blue to greenish gray in front, and brilliant white behind. The illicium has two dark rings, though this is faint or absent in a few individuals.

The coloration is olive green above with large irregular blotches surrounded by smaller circular spots, extending into the rays of the dorsal, pectoral, and caudal fins. There is often a kidney- or figure-8-shaped blotch on the nape. These spots appear darker than the background in preserved specimens, but are a lighter greenish-yellow color in life. The underside is rose-colored with large, diffuse lighter patches; the red color extends up the sides of the head forward of the eyes, encompassing the jaws. The fin membranes are also shades of red. The iris is a deep rose red. This species attains a maximum of 30.5 cm total length.

Redeye gapers are sedentary ambush predators that spend most of their time resting on the sea floor on their pectoral and pelvic fins, moving only to capture prey or avoid predators. They attract prey to them using their movable esca. If threatened, they raise themselves up on their pelvic fins and rapidly take in water to increase the size of their bodies. Redeye gapers are known to be able to survive the temperature and pressure changes from being brought to the surface.
