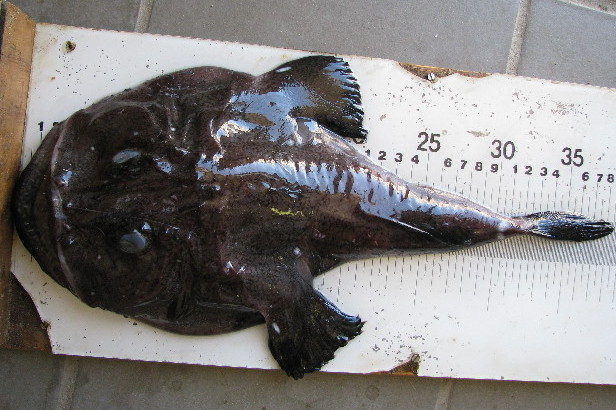

Conservation status
- Near Threatened (IUCN 3.1)

Scientific classification
- Kingdom: Animalia
- Phylum: Chordata
- Class: Actinopterygii
- Order: Lophiiformes
- Family: Lophiidae
- Genus: Lophius
- Species: L. vomerinus

Binomial name
- Lophius vomerinus Valenciennes, 1837

Synonyms
- Lophius upsicephalus Smith, 1841

= Lophius vomerinus =

Species of marine ray-finned fish

Lophius vomerinus, the devil anglerfish, Cape monk or Cape monkfish, is a species of marine ray-finned fish belonging to the family Lophiidae. It is endemic to the waters of the southeastern Atlantic and the southwestern Indian Ocean, around Southern Africa.

== Taxonomy ==
Lophius vomerinus was first formally described in 1837 by the French zoologist Achille Valenciennes with its type locality given as the Cape of Good Hope. The genus Lophius is one of the four extant genera in the family Lophiidae, which the 5th edition of Fishes of the World classifies in the order Lophiiformes.

== Etymology ==
The specific name vomerinus means "vomerine", referring to the lack of teeth on the vomer (although this appears to be an age-related feature).

== Description ==
Lophius vomerinus has six dorsal spines, three on the head and three to the rear of the head. The second dorsal fin contains 9 or 10 soft rays. The anal fin contains 9 soft rays. The illicium has a simple pennant-like esca. The overall color is dark brown on the upper body and pale on the lower body. The large pectoral fins are darker towards their tips on their upper surface, pale on the lower surface with a dark brown band covering the outer third. This species has a maximum published total length of 100 cm (39 in), although 50 cm (20 in) is more typical.

== Distribution and habitat ==
Lophius vomerinus is endemic to the coasts of southern Africa, where its range extends from north of the Walvis Ridge off Namibia in the southeastern Atlantic Ocean to KwaZulu-Natal and Madagascar in the southeastern Indian Ocean. It is a bathydemersal species found on the deeper areas of the continental shelf and on the upper continental slope, over soft bottoms and at depths of 150–400 m (490–1,310 ft).

== Fisheries and conservation ==
Lophius vomerinus is an important target species for commercial fisheries in Namibia. The current rate of landing is in excess of that which is considered sustainable. The IUCN classifies the Cape monk as Near Threatened, as the decline in population is not high enough for it to be of higher conservation concern.
