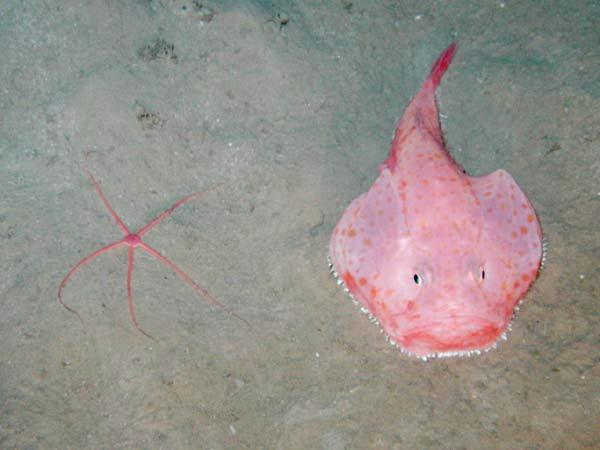

Conservation status
- Least Concern (IUCN 3.1)

Scientific classification
- Kingdom: Animalia
- Phylum: Chordata
- Class: Actinopterygii
- Order: Lophiiformes
- Family: Chaunacidae
- Genus: Chaunax
- Species: C. pictus

Binomial name
- Chaunax pictus R. T. Lowe, 1846

Synonyms
- Chaunax nuttingi Garman, 1896

= Pink frogmouth =

Species of fish

The pink frogmouth (Chaunax pictus), or redeye, pink gaper or uniform gaper, is a species of marine ray-finned fish belonging to the family Chaunacidae, the sea toads. This species is found in the Atlantic Ocean.

== Taxonomy ==
The pink frogmouth was first formally described in 1846 by the Englaih naturalist Richard Thomas Lowe with its type locality given as Picos, 5 or 6 miles (8.0 or 9.7 km) west of Funchal off Madeira. When Lowe described the species he classified it in the new genus Chaunax, making the pink frogmouth the type species of Chaunax by monotypy. Within the genus Chaunax this species is placed in the Chaunax pictus species group. The genus Chaunax is one of two genera classified by the 5th edition of the Fishes of the World within the family Chaunacidae, the sea toads. The sea toads are placed within the monotypic suborder Chaunacoidei within the anglerfish order Lophiiformes.

== Etymology ==
The pink frogmouth is classified in the genus Chaunax which means "one who gapes", from chanos meaning "to gape", an allusion to the large, wide mouths of these fishes. The specific name pictus, an allusion to the bright colours of this fish.

== Description ==
The pink frogmouth has a globular, slightly compressed body which tapers to a small, rounded caudal fin. The large head is somewhat cuboid with small eyes which are covered in transparent skin. The large, oblique mouth is equipped with many small, thin, sharp vertical teeth and the gill opening is small. Of the three dorsal spines, two are embedded in the skin on the nape and only the first, the illicium is visible. The illicium is tipped with a lure, or esca which is a mop-like tuft of filaments. The illicium is lowered into a depression on the snout when not being used to attract prey. The dorsal fin is on the rear of the body and contains between 10 and 12 soft rays while the anal fin has 6 or 7 soft rays. The loose, flabby skin has a dense covering of very small denticles. The lateral line is open and runs from the caudal peduncle to the head, with obvious canals connecting to branches under the eye, on the chin and along the lower flanks. The main part of the lateral line on the upper body contains between 29 and 42 pores with between 11 and 13 pores on the head. The overall colour is rosy red to orange red, there may be some yellow spotting on the back. The abdomen and fins are darker red. The depression on the snout where the illicium rests is dark brown to black while the esca is bluish black to the front and white to the rear. This species has a maximum published total length of 40 cm (16 in).

== Distribution and habitat ==
The pink frogmouth is restricted to the Atlantic Ocean, records from other parts of the world are considered to be misidentifications. In the eastern Atlantic this species occurs from off the coast of Ireland and the northwestern Iberian Peninsula south as far as South Africa, including the Azores, Madeira and Cape Verde. In the western Atlantic its range extends from New York to the Amazon, including the Caribbean and Gulf of Mexico. It was reported to be found in the Mediterranean Sea but these records have subsequently been shown to be misidentifications of S. suttkusi. The pink frogmouth is bathydemersal in waters at depths between 200 and 1,000 m (660 and 3,280 ft), over soft and hard substrates.
