= C. stigmaeus =

C. stigmaeus may refer to:

- Chaunax stigmaeus, the redeye gaper, an anglerfish species
- Citharichthys stigmaeus, the speckled sanddab, a flatfish species
