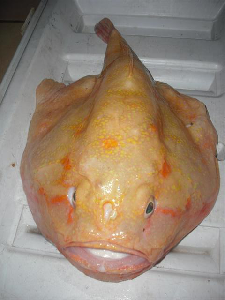

Conservation status
- Least Concern (IUCN 3.1)

Scientific classification
- Kingdom: Animalia
- Phylum: Chordata
- Class: Actinopterygii
- Division: Teleostei
- Order: Lophiiformes
- Family: Chaunacidae
- Genus: Chaunax
- Species: C. endeavouri

Binomial name
- Chaunax endeavouri Whitley, 1929

= Furry coffinfish =

Species of fish

The furry coffinfish (Chaunax endeavouri), also sometimes referred to as the coffinfish, is a species of marine ray-finned fish belonging to the family Chaunacidae, the sea toads. It is found in salty temperate waters of southwestern Pacific, off east coast of Australia.

== Taxonomy ==
The furry coffinfish was first formally described in 1929 by the Australian ichthyologist Gilbert Percy Whitley with its type locality given as east of Flinders Island in the Bass Strait at a depths of 70 to 100 fathoms (130 to 180 m). Within the genus Chaunax this species is placed in the Chaunax fimbriatus species group.

=== Etymology ===
The furry coffinfish is classified in the genus Chaunax which means "one who gapes", from chanos meaning "to gape", an allusion to the large, wide mouths of these fishes. The specific name endeavouri commemorates the F. I. S. Endeavour, an Australian fisheries survey vessel, the type of this species was collected from this vessel in 1913. The vessel was lost at sea, with all hands, the following year. Workers on the Endeavour were responsible for collecting the types of many new species of Australian fishes.

== Distribution and habitat ==
The furry coffinfish is endemic to the temperate waters of the southwestern Pacific, off east coast of Australia.

The furry coffinfish is a benthic fish, it is found on muddy bottom of the ocean, Australian continental shelf and upper slope in the deep ocean, usually 200m–2500m.

The Indian Ocean also has two different types of coffinfish residing in its deep waters: Chaunax nebulosus and Chaunax africanus. They differ in color due to different markings on dorsal parts. C. nebolosus has green spots and black markings, while C. africanus has long narrow brown bars.

== Description ==
The furry coffinfish has a rounded body and ventrally compressed with loose skin; tapering to a small rounded tail. Head very large and globose with especially prominent open lateral-line canals; eyes dorsolateral; the mouth is large, oblique to nearly vertical, with relatively small, sharp slender teeth. Lure is short, located just behind snout within a depression that it rests in; the esca is mop-like, a dense cluster of numerous, short, thread-like cirri. The skin is densely covered with small to minute spine-like scales that are somewhat similar both in shape and feel to placoid scales of sharks. Single open lateral-line canal on body joining conspicuous canals on head and extending posteriorly to proximal portion of caudal fin. Anal-fin rays 6 or 7 (usually 7); Soft dorsal fin with 10 to 12 rays; pectoral fins narrow and paddle-like, with 10 to 15 soft rays; greatest distance between anterolateral angles of sphenotic bones is 15 to 23% of the standard length. 10 to 13 Neuromasts in a supraorbital row, 2 to 4 neuromasts in the upper pre-opercular row, 3 to 5 neuromasts in the lower pre-opercular row, 10 to 13 in pectoral row, 29 to 42 in lateral line. The color of C. endeavouri is generally pink, reddish, orange, or rose-colored; some with pale diffuse spots of yellow or olive green.

== Reproduction and development ==
The furry coffinfish lays eggs in buoyant mucous ribbon-like "rafts". These buoyant rafts are an excellent device for broadcasting a large number of small eggs over great geographic distances providing for development in relatively productive surface waters.

After hatching, the larvae swim to the surface and feed on plankton. As they mature, they return to the depths below. The morphology of the larval stage seems to reflect an adaptation to a long larval life. The larvae are translucent, round and found in the pelagic zone, unlike the benthic, dorsoventrally compressed adults.

== Behavior and ecology ==
C. endeavouri has inflatable gills that it uses to fill its body with water, acting as a defense mechanism much like the pufferfish. When the gill chambers are completely filled with water, there is no inhalation or exhalation for 26 to 245 seconds. This is beneficial for energy preservation. The body of the C. endeavouri will increase in volume by 30% with full gill chambers and will protect it against predators.

=== Food ===
The furry coffinfish adults are ambush predators that use small lures above their snouts to attract small, invertebrate crustaceans to their mouths. The furry coffinfish is a deep ocean, benthic predator of small crustaceans, like Acanthomysis microps, a deep sea shrimp.

=== Perception ===
The furry coffinfish has a very large number of lateral line canals allowing it to detect movement in their surroundings as they often live in low-visibility areas. This is especially beneficial as an ambush predator.

=== Predation ===
The furry coffinfish, as with other anglerfishes, including the larger species, appears to be consumed by larger predatory fishes such as sharks, like the deep sea piscivorous cow sharks.

== Economic importance ==
Furry coffinfishes, like other species in Chaunax, have been bycatch for deep sea trawlers.

== Conservation ==
The furry coffinfish was categorized as "High Risk" from oceanic trawlers in an Ecological Risk Assessment by the Australian Fisheries Management Authority due to their high susceptibility to trawlers (Being benthic) and relatively low productivity. However, they are non-threatened due to their wide area of distribution.
