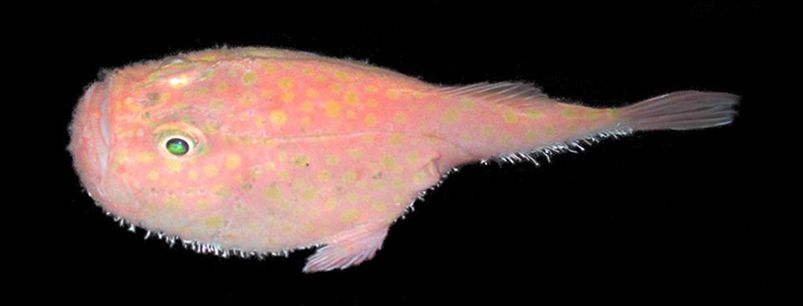

Conservation status
- Least Concern (IUCN 3.1)

Scientific classification
- Kingdom: Animalia
- Phylum: Chordata
- Class: Actinopterygii
- Order: Lophiiformes
- Family: Chaunacidae
- Genus: Chaunax
- Species: C. suttkusi

Binomial name
- Chaunax suttkusi Caruso, 1989

= Chaunax suttkusi =

Species of fish

Chaunax suttkissi, the pale-cavity gaper, spotted frogmouth, spotted gaper or Sutkus sea toad, is a species of marine ray-finned fish belonging to the family Chaunacidae, the sea toads. This species is found in the Atlantic Ocean.

== Taxonomy ==
Chaunax suttkisi was first formally described in 1989 by the American ichthyologist John H. Caruso with its type locality given as off Venezuela in the Caribbean Sea at 11°40'N, 62°33'W, at a depth of 585–622 m (1,919–2,041 ft). Within the genus Chaunax this species is placed in the Chaunax fimbriatus species group. The genus Chaunax is one of two genera classified by the 5th edition of the Fishes of the World within the family Chaunacidae, the sea toads. The sea toads are placed within the monotypic suborder Chaunacoidei within the anglerfish order Lophiiformes.

== Etymology ==
Chaunax, the genus name, means "one who gapes", from chanos meaning "to gape", an allusion to the large, wide mouths of these fishes. The specific name suttkusi, honours Royal D. Suttkus, an ichthyologist at Tulane University for his contributions to ichthyology and the extensive collection of fish specimens he collated during his career at the university.

== Description ==
Chaunax suttkusi has a globular, slight compressed body which tapers to a small, rounded caudal fin. The large head is somewhat cuboid with small eyes which are covered in transparent skin. The large, oblique mouth is equipped with many small, thin, sharp vertical teeth and the gill opening is small. Of the three dorsal spines, two are embedded in the skin on the nape and only the first, the illicium is visible. The illicium is tipped with a lure, or esca which is a mop-like tuft of filaments. The illicium is lowered into a flat, concave depression on the snout when not being used to attract prey. The dorsal fin is on the rear of the body and contains between 10 and 12 soft rays while the anal fin has 6 or 7 soft rays. The loose, flabby skin has a dense covering of robust denticles. The lateral line is open and runs from the caudal peduncle to the head, with obvious canals connecting to branches under the eye, on the chin and along the lower flanks. The main part of the lateral line on the upper body contains between 29 and 42 pores with between 11 and 13 pores on the head. The overall colour is pale pink to rosy pink, with red on the top and sides of the head and fins and the undersides of both the head and body are whitish. The cavity on the snout for the illicium is pale while the illicium and esca are uniform in color, varying from pale through to dusky with the filaments of the esca being black. This species has a maximum published total length of 26.7 cm (10.5 in) and a maximum published weight of 359 g (12.7 oz).

== Distribution and habitat ==
Chaunax suttkusi is found in the Atlantic Ocean. In the eastern Atlantic it occurs from Ireland south as far as Angola, its range includes the Azores, while in the western Atlantic it can be found from South Carolina as far south as the Rio Grande Rise. It has also been found in the Mediterranean Sea. The range of this species is thought to be extending northwards due to increasing temperatures as a result of climate change.This is a bathydemersal species found at depths between 220 and 1,060 m (720 and 3,480 ft) on soft bottoms on the continental shelf.
