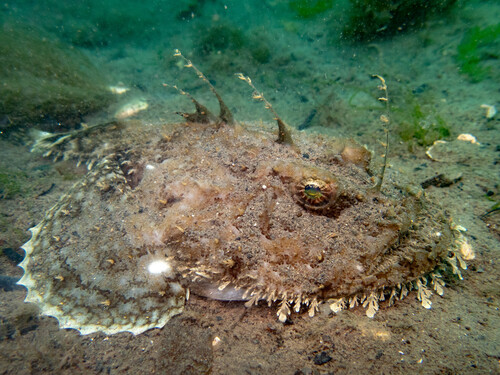

Conservation status
- Least Concern (IUCN 3.1) (Global)

- Least Concern (IUCN 3.1) (Europe and the Mediterranean)

Scientific classification
- Kingdom: Animalia
- Phylum: Chordata
- Class: Actinopterygii
- Division: Teleostei
- Order: Lophiiformes
- Family: Lophiidae
- Genus: Lophius
- Species: L. piscatorius

Binomial name
- Lophius piscatorius Linnaeus, 1758

Synonyms
- Batrachus piscatorius (L., 1758); Batrachus piscator (L., 1758) (misspelling); Lophius eurypterus Düben & Koren, 1845; Batrachus eurypterus (Düben & Koren, 1845)

= Lophius piscatorius =

Species of fish

Lophius piscatorius, commonly known as the angler, toadfish, sea frog, fishing frog, frogfish, or sea devil, is a species of Lophius in the family Lophiidae. It occurs in coastal and shelf waters of the northeast Atlantic, ranging from the Barents Sea south to the Strait of Gibraltar, and is also present in the Mediterranean and Black Sea. In parts of its range, including the Irish Sea, it supports an important commercial fishery.

== Taxonomy ==
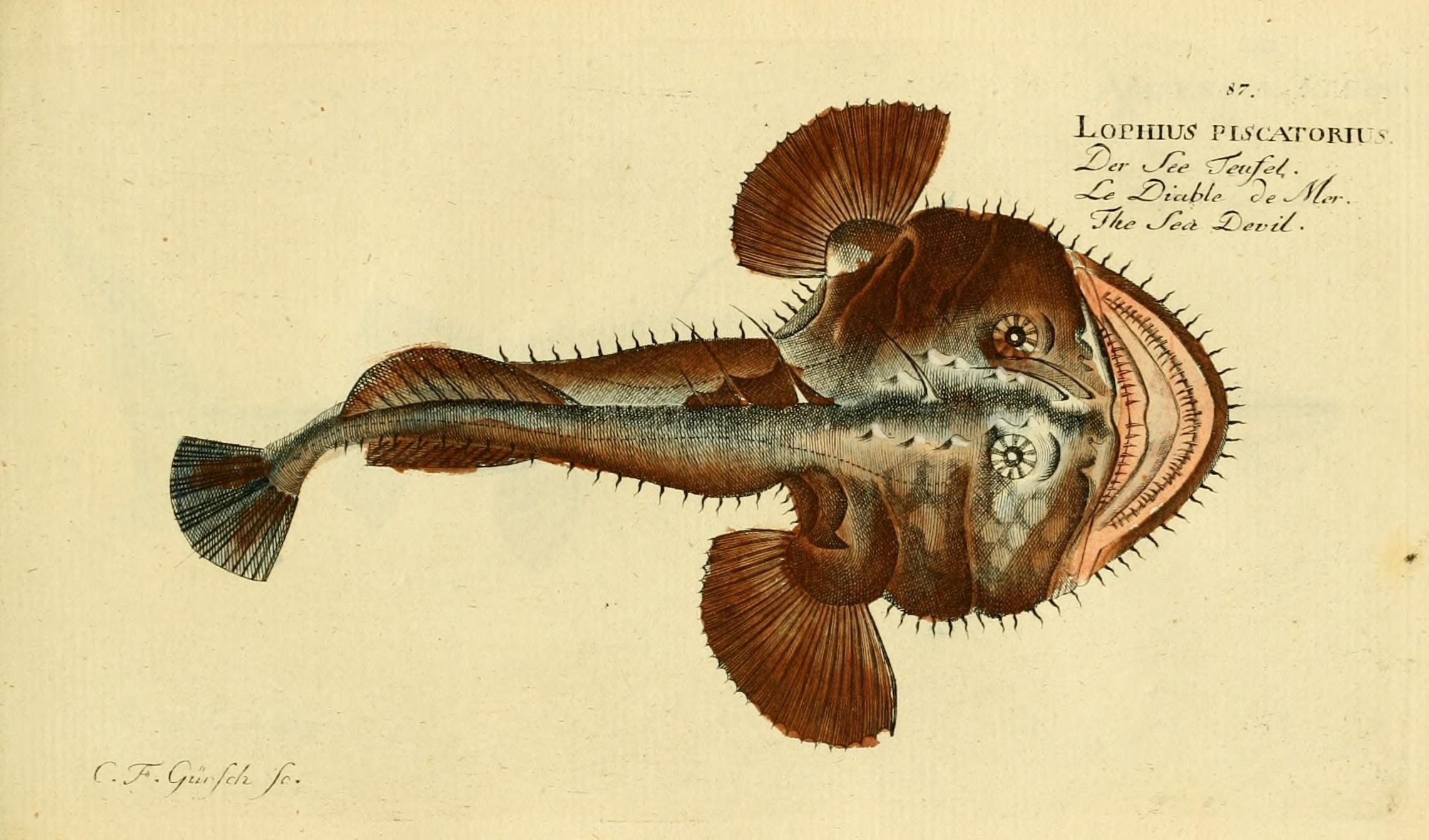
Illustration of L. piscatorius from vol. 5 of Marcus Elieser Bloch's Histoire naturelle des poissons (1796)

Lophius piscatorius was first formally described by Carl Linnaeus in the 10th edition of Systema Naturae given as "in Oceano Europæo", meaning the Northeastern Atlantic Ocean, Mediterranean and Black Seas with localities mentioned including Bordeaux, Marseille and Montpellier in France; Genoa, Rome, Naples and Venice in Italy; Lesbos in Greece; and Syria. When Linnaeus described this species he created a new genus, Lophius. In 1883, David Starr Jordan and Charles Henry Gilbert designated this species as the type species of that genus. The genus Lophius is one of four extant genera in the family Lophiidae, which the 5th edition of Fishes of the World classifies in the monotypic suborder Lophioidei within the order Lophiiformes.

== Etymology ==
Lophius piscatorius has the genus name Lophius which means "mane" and is presumably a reference to the first three spines of the first dorsal fin which are tentacle like, with three smaller spines behind them. The specific name piscatorius, this means "of fishing", this is a reference to the first dorsal spine being modified into a "fishing rod", called the illicium tipped with a lure, the esca, which is used to attract prey within reach of the huge mouth.

== Description ==
The average size of European anglers is 40–60 centimetres (16–24 in), with larger specimens exceeding this range. Precise ranges in body size tend to vary between different localities and populations. Average size also tends to increase with depth; populations living in deeper waters are larger-bodied overall than shallow-water ones.

It has a very large head which is broad, flat, and depressed; the rest of the body appears to be a mere appendage. The wide mouth extends all the way around the anterior circumference of the head, and both jaws are armed with bands of long, pointed teeth. These are inclined inwards and can be closed so as to offer no impediment to an object gliding towards the stomach, but to prevent its escape from the mouth.

The pectoral and pelvic fins are articulated as to perform the functions of feet, so the fish is able to walk along the bottom of the sea, where it generally hides in the sand or amongst seaweed. Around its head and also along the body, the skin bears fringed appendages resembling short fronds of seaweed, a structure which, combined with the ability to match the colour of the body to its surroundings, assists this fish in camouflaging itself in the places which it selects on account of the abundance of prey. It has no scales.

The ovaries of female anglers take the form of two long, ribbon-like lobes connected at their posterior ends. One side consists of an egg-producing layer, while the other produces a gelatinous secretion that fills the ovarian lumen during egg maturation. During the reproductive season, the ovaries swell until they fill the abdominal cavity. Male testes are elongated and bean-shaped in cross-section. Spermatogenesis begins in sac-like cysts and is completed in the lumina.

== Habitat ==
The European angler inhabits muddy and sandy bottoms up to depths of 1,000 metres (3,300 ft). It is occasionally found on rocky bottoms as well. They rarely occur below the continental slope.

== Behaviour ==
=== Feeding ===
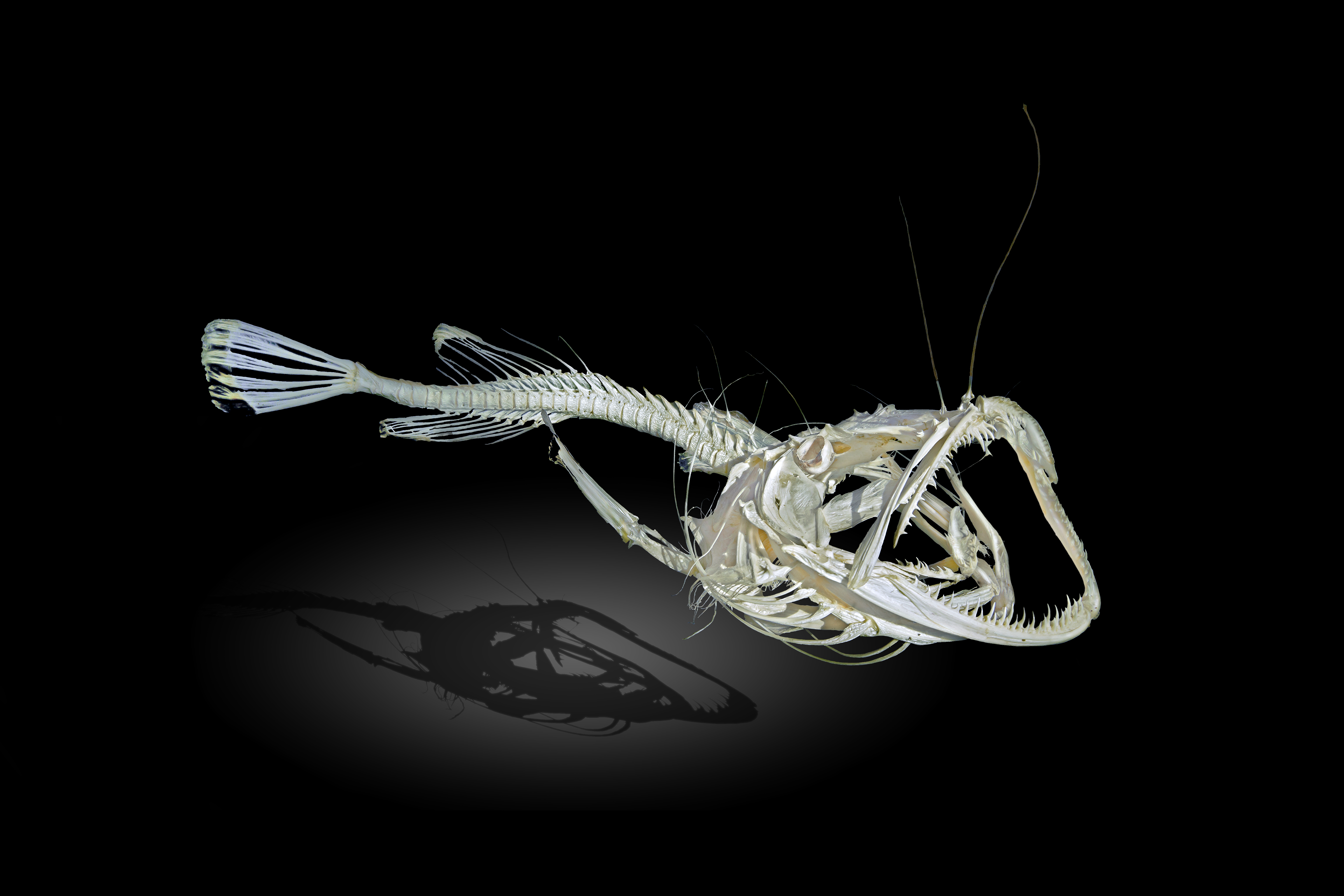
Skeleton at the Muséum de Toulouse

The fish has long filaments along the middle of its head, which are, in fact, the detached and modified three first spines of the anterior dorsal fin. The filament most important to the angler is the first, which is the longest, terminates in a lappet, and is movable in every direction. The angler is believed to attract other fish by means of its lure, and then to seize them with its enormous jaws. While it is considered probable that smaller fish are attracted in this way experiments have shown that the actions of the jaw is automatic and depends on the contact of the prey with the tentacle. Its stomach is expandable and it is not unheard of for these fish to swallow prey of their own size.

Adult anglers feed primarily on fish, while juveniles prey mainly on marine invertebrates. Norway pout is the most common prey item in Northern European waters, while blue whiting is more common among southern population. Whiting and Norway lobster are among the main prey of adult anglers in the Irish Sea. Lesser sandeel is a seasonally common prey item around the Shetland Islands. Cephalopods are an important food source in the Cantabrian Sea. In 1940, an angler was discovered with a herring gull in its stomach, and it is known to surface and attempt to capture waterbirds.

=== Breeding and lifecycle ===
The spawn of the angler consists of a thin sheet of transparent gelatinous material 60 to 90 cm (2 to 3 ft) wide and 7.5–9 m (25–30 ft) long drifting freely in the water. The eggs in this sheet are in a single layer, each in its own little cavity. The larvae are free-swimming and their pelvic fins are elongated into filaments. As many as 300,000 to 2,800,000 eggs may be released in a single spawning. The egg sheets are buoyant and float near the surface of the water, where the action of wind and surface currents may aid dispersal.

A male angler matures at the age of four years and grows to be 40 cm (16 in) long; whereas the female angler takes two years longer to mature.

The primary spawning season is distributed between February and June, peaking in spring. A secondary spawning season occurs in November and December, although with a lower percentage of actively reproducing individuals than observed in the primary season.

== Relationship with humans ==
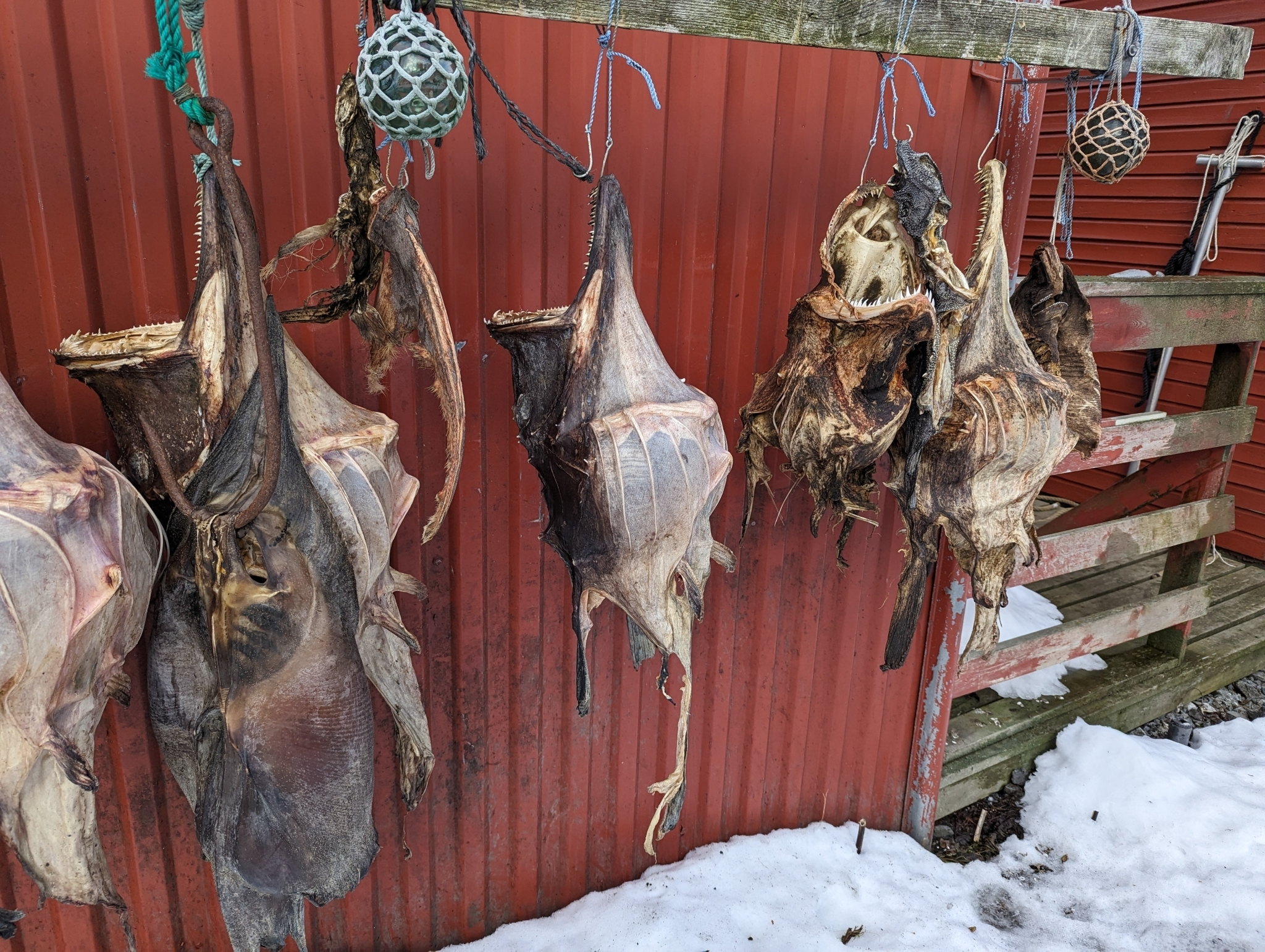
L. piscatorius harvested and hung up to dry in Kjerringøy, Norway.

Lophius piscatorius has historically been considered valuable bycatch in Atlantic fisheries. Captures increased significantly following the development of improvements in deep-water fishing technology. The species has been an important fishery resource in Iberian waters since the 1980s. The related species Lophius budegassa is often caught alongside it, but L. piscatorius is the more abundant of the two.
