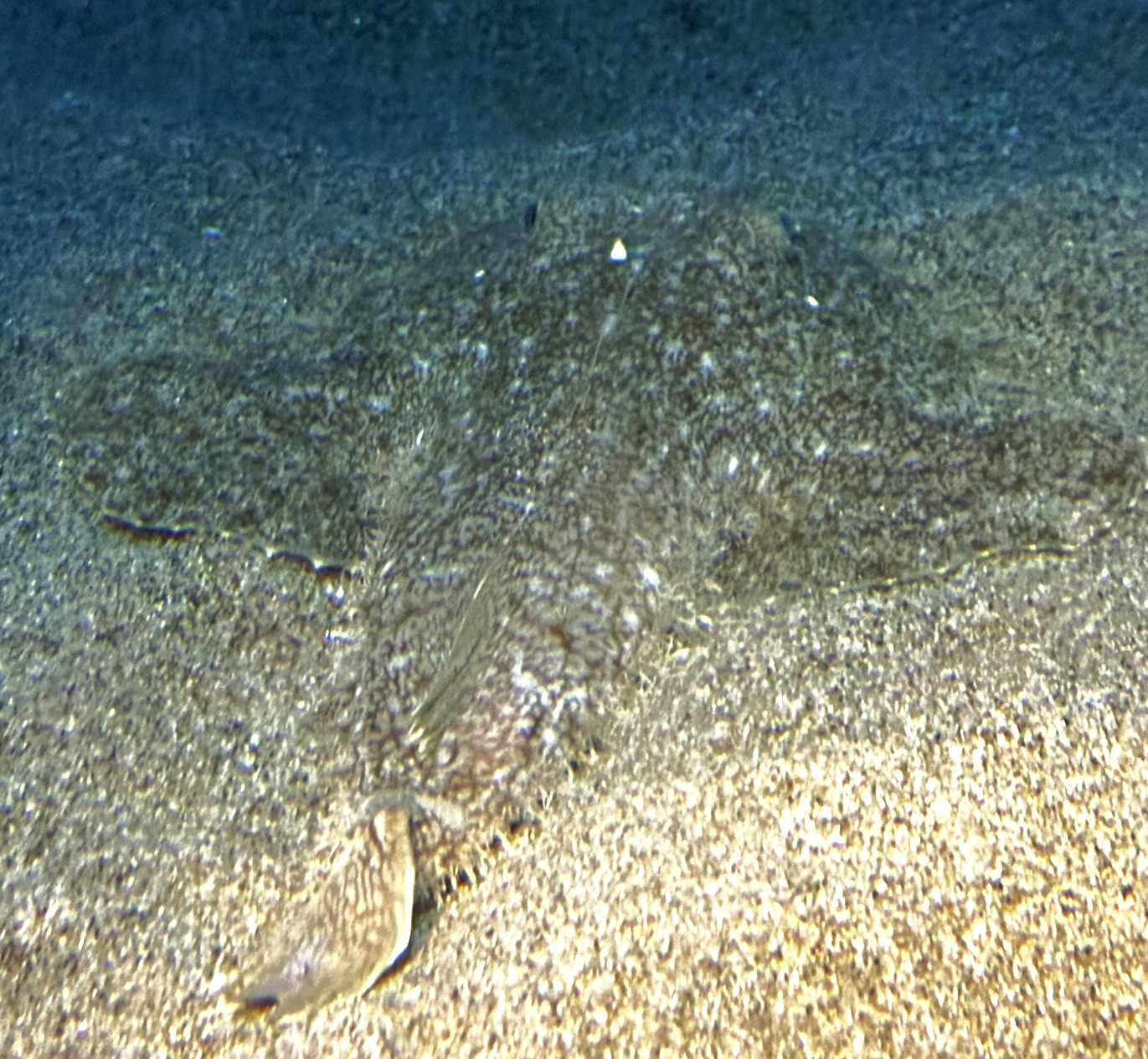

Scientific classification
- Kingdom: Animalia
- Phylum: Chordata
- Class: Actinopterygii
- Division: Teleostei
- Order: Lophiiformes
- Family: Lophiidae
- Genus: Lophius
- Species: L. litulon

Binomial name
- Lophius litulon Jordan, 1902

= Lophius litulon =

Species of fishes

Lophius litulon (or the yellow goosefish) is a species of marine fish in the family Lophiidae native to Northwest Pacific Ocean. The species is a bottom dwelling predator that feeds primarily on fish and crustaceans. L. litulon is commercially harvested for food and marketed as monkfish.

== Distribution and habitat ==
Lophius litulon occurs in the northwestern Pacific Ocean, including Japan, Korea, the Yellow Sea, and the East China Sea. The species can be found on sandy muddy bottom of the sea floor.

== Ecology ==
Lophius litulon is an opportunistic ambush predator that attracts prey with an angling apparatus in its mouth called in illicium. The species feeds on both fish and crustaceans, with the silver croaker (Pennahia argentata) as the preferred prey.

== Reproduction and growth ==
The species demonstrates sexual dimorphism, with females growing faster and living longer than males. The maximum observed ages in yellow goosefish collected from the East China and Yellow sees between 1991 and 1996 was eight years for males and thirteen years for females.

Seasonal changes in distribution indicates the species undergoes spawning migration. In the winter, males are generally found in the East China Sea and females in the Yellow Sea. Spawning occurs in the spring, from February to May.

== Fisheries and use as food ==
Lophius litulon is a commercially important food fish in East Asia. Its economic importance in fisheries off Shandong, China, has increased in recent decades.

L. litulon is marketed as monkfish in the United States.
