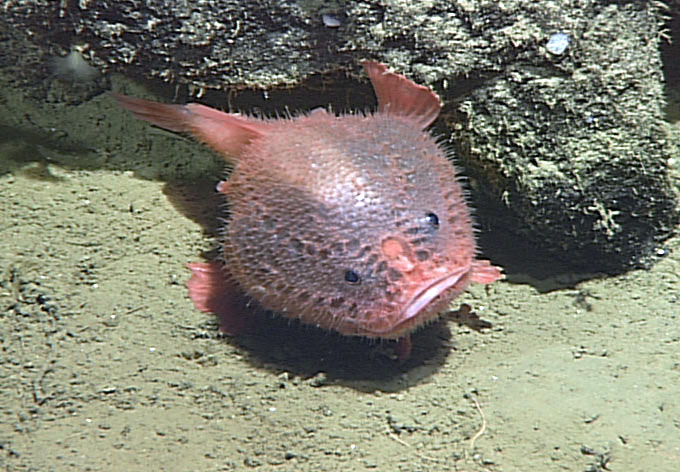
- Chaunacops coloratus at the Davidson Seamount

Scientific classification
- Kingdom: Animalia
- Phylum: Chordata
- Class: Actinopterygii
- Order: Lophiiformes
- Family: Chaunacidae
- Genus: Chaunacops; Garman, 1899

Type species
- Chaunax coloratus Garman, 1899

Synonyms
- Bathychaunax J. H. Caruso 1989

= Chaunacops =

Genus of fishes

Chaunacops is a genus of marine ray-finned fishes belonging to the family Chaunacidae, the sea toads. This genus of deep-sea anglerfishes contains 4 species and these are found in the Indo-West Pacific, southeastern Pacific and western Atlantic oceans. Little is known about the life history and biology of these fishes.

== Taxonomy ==
Chaunacops was first proposed as a genus in 1899 by the American ichthyologist Samuel Garman when he described Chaunacops coloratus as a new species. C. coloratus was described from the "Pacific over Cocos Ridge" at 5°43'N, 85°50'W, named as Albatross station 3363 at a depth of 978 fathoms (1,789 m). This genus is classified within the family Chaunacidae, the sea toads, one of two genera in that family, the sea toads are placed within the monotypic suborder Chaunacoidei within the anglerfish order Lophiiformes.

== Species ==
There are currently 4 recognized species in this genus:

Image	Scientific name	Common name	Distribution	IUCN status
	Chaunacops coloratus Garman, 1899	Rosy or red coffinfish	eastern Indian Ocean and eastern Pacific Ocean	Least Concern
	Chaunacops melanostomus J. H. Caruso, 1989	Tadpole coffinfish	Eastern Indian Ocean	Least Concern
	Chaunacops roseus (Barbour, 1941)	Northwest gaper or rosy coffinfish	Western Atlantic Ocean	Least Concern
	Chaunacops spinosus H.-C. Ho & McGrouther, 2015	Eastern tadpole coffinfish	Australia and New Caledonia	Least Concern

A sea toad photographed at a depth of 3,148 m (10,328 ft) by a Remotely operated underwater vehicle from the NOAAS Okeanos Explorer on the "Beach Ridge" seamount in the Musicians Seamounts on 8 September 2017 was brighter red than C. coloratus with larger cirri and the prickles on its back were smaller or absent compared to C. coloratus. This fish may be a life stage or morph of C. coloratus or it may be a new undescribed species, confirmation requires the collection of a type.

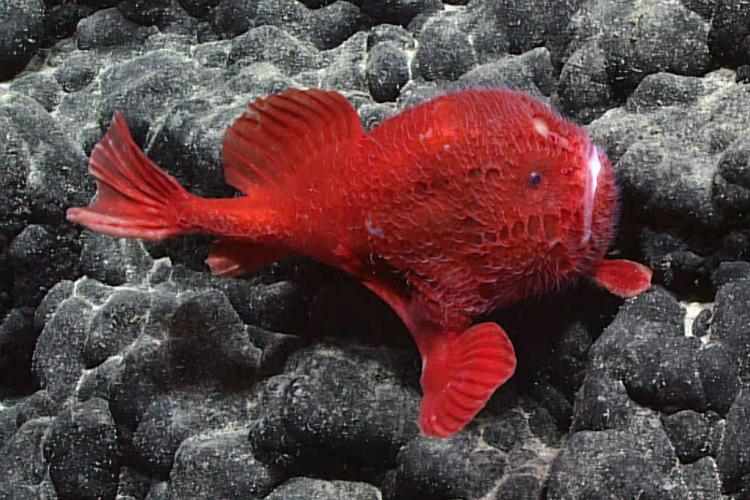
The red sea toad. an undescribed species or morph from the Musicians Seamounts northeast of Oahu

== Etymology ==
Chaunacops means "similar to or looking like Chaunax. The specific names of the four species are: coloratus, meaning "colored", this species was described as having a life color of "deep rose" with dark tints around the mouth and the orbit; melanostomus, meaning "black mouth", a reference to the black lining to the mouth; roseus, meaning "rosy", again, referring to the life color; and spinosus, meaning "spiny", this species having a denser covering of spiny denticles than its congeners.

== Characteristics ==
Chaunacops sea toads are characterized as having globose heads, open sensory and lateral line canals, and loose skin covered by small spine-like scales. Colour, which has been noted as an important distinguishing characteristic, has generally been described as pink, reddish orange, or rose. They have rounded, slightly compressed bodies which taper to a small tail. The eyes are placed high on the sides of the head and are covered in a window of transparent skin. Their large mouths are upward pointing and have thin, sharp, vertical teeth. The opening to the gills is small. There is a single dorsal spine, the illicium, or "fishing rod", tipped with the esca, or "lure", made up of a dense, mop-like cluster of short filaments. The other two dorsal spines are embedded in the skin. The dorsal fin is supported by 12 soft rays while the anal fin is supported by 5 or 6 soft rays. The loose, flabby skin is covered in rough, widely speaced tiny denticles. However, Lundsten et al. suggests that juvenile C. coloratus may be blue and only adults are red or rose coloured. The largest species in the genus is C. roseus which has a maximum published total length of 21.9 cm (8.6 in) while the smallest is C. melanostomus with a maximum published standard length of 10 cm (3.9 in).

== Distribution and habitat ==
Chaunacops sea toads are distributed around the world but are not known from the eastern Atlantic Ocean or Mediterranean Sea.

Chaunacops sea toads are being collected in some numbers from Eastern and Western Australia. A paper published in 2015 stated that a newly identified species in genus Chaunacops was found off the coasts of Australia and New Caledonia.

Chaunacops sea toads are typically found at deeper depths than Chaunax, but with considerable overlap between the two genera. Chaunacops coloratus are also often found near "manganese-encrusted volcanic talus slopes".

== Biology ==
Chaunacops sea toad, like other anglerfishes, are ambush predators which use the illicium and esca to attract prey to within striking distance of their large mouths. Like the anglerfishies inhabiting shallow water these sea toads can use their pectoral fins to walk over the substrate. C. coloratus has the ability to inflate its body into a large ball and this is thought to be to deter predators. These fishes have sometimes been described as having bioluminescent lures, however, there is no evidence that this is the case. The related batfishes belonging to the family Ogcocephalidae live in similar habitats to sea toads and they use scent to attract prey towards the lures and it seems probable that sea toads use a similar luring technique. However, the biology of these deep sea fishes remains largely unknown.
