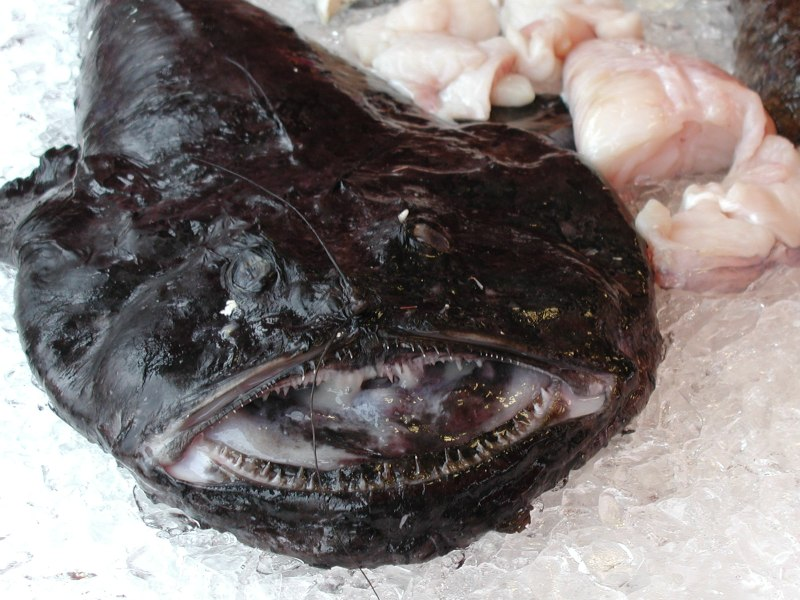

Scientific classification
- Kingdom: Animalia
- Phylum: Chordata
- Class: Actinopterygii
- Division: Teleostei
- Order: Lophiiformes
- Suborder: Lophioidei
- Family: Lophiidae
- Genus: Lophius; Linnaeus, 1758

Type species
- Lophius piscatorius Linnaeus, 1758

Species
- See text

Synonyms
- Discolophius Fowler, 1943; Lophidius Rafinesque, 1815; Lophiopsis Guichenot, 1867

= Lophius =

Monkfish Temporal range: 48.6–0 Ma Lutetian to present

Genus of fishes

Members of the genus Lophius, commonly called monkfish, toadfish, sea frogs, fishing frogs, frogfish, and sea devils, are various species of lophiid anglerfishes found in the Atlantic and Indian Oceans. Lophius is known as the "monk" or "monkfish" to the North Sea and North Atlantic fishermen, a name which also belongs to Squatina squatina, the angelshark, a type of shark. The North European species is Lophius piscatorius, and the Mediterranean species is Lophius budegassa.

== Taxonomy ==
Lophius was first proposed as a genus by Carl Linnaeus when he described Lophius piscatorius in the 10th edition of Systema Naturae given as "in Oceano Europæo", meaning the Northeastern Atlantic Ocean, Mediterranean and Black Seas with localities mentioned including Bordeaux, Marseille and Montpellier in France; Genoa, Rome, Naples and Venice in Italy; Lesbos in Greece; and Syria.

The genus Lophius is one of 4 extant genera in the family Lophiidae which the 5th edition of Fishes of the World classifies in the monotypic suborder Lophioidei within the order Lophiiformes. Within the Lophiidae Lophius is most closely related to Lophiomus with Lophiodes' being the sister taxon to these and with Sladenia as the most basal sister group to the other three genera.

== Etymology ==
Lophius means "mane" and is presumably a reference to the first three spines of the first dorsal fin which are tentacle like, with three smaller spines behind them.

== Species ==
The seven recognized extant species in this genus are:

Image	Scientific name	Common name	Distribution
	Lophius americanus Valenciennes, 1837	American angler	Western Atlantic from Newfoundland and Quebec south to northern Florida
	Lophius budegassa Spinola, 1807	blackbellied angler	Mediterranean and eastern Atlantic
	Lophius gastrophysus A. Miranda-Ribeiro, 1915	blackfin goosefish	coasts of northern South America, Central America, Aruba, Cuba, and Costa Rica
	Lophius litulon D. S. Jordan, 1902	yellow goosefish	Japan, Korea, and the Yellow and East China seas.
	Lophius piscatorius Linnaeus, 1758	angler, European angler or common monkfish	northeast Atlantic, from the Barents Sea to the Strait of Gibraltar, the Mediterranean and the Black Sea
	Lophius vaillanti Regan, 1903	shortspine African angler	Eastern Atlantic
	Lophius vomerinus Valenciennes, 1837	devil anglerfish	Durban, South Africa, as well as northern Namibia, where it is found in the Indian and Atlantic Oceans

== Description ==
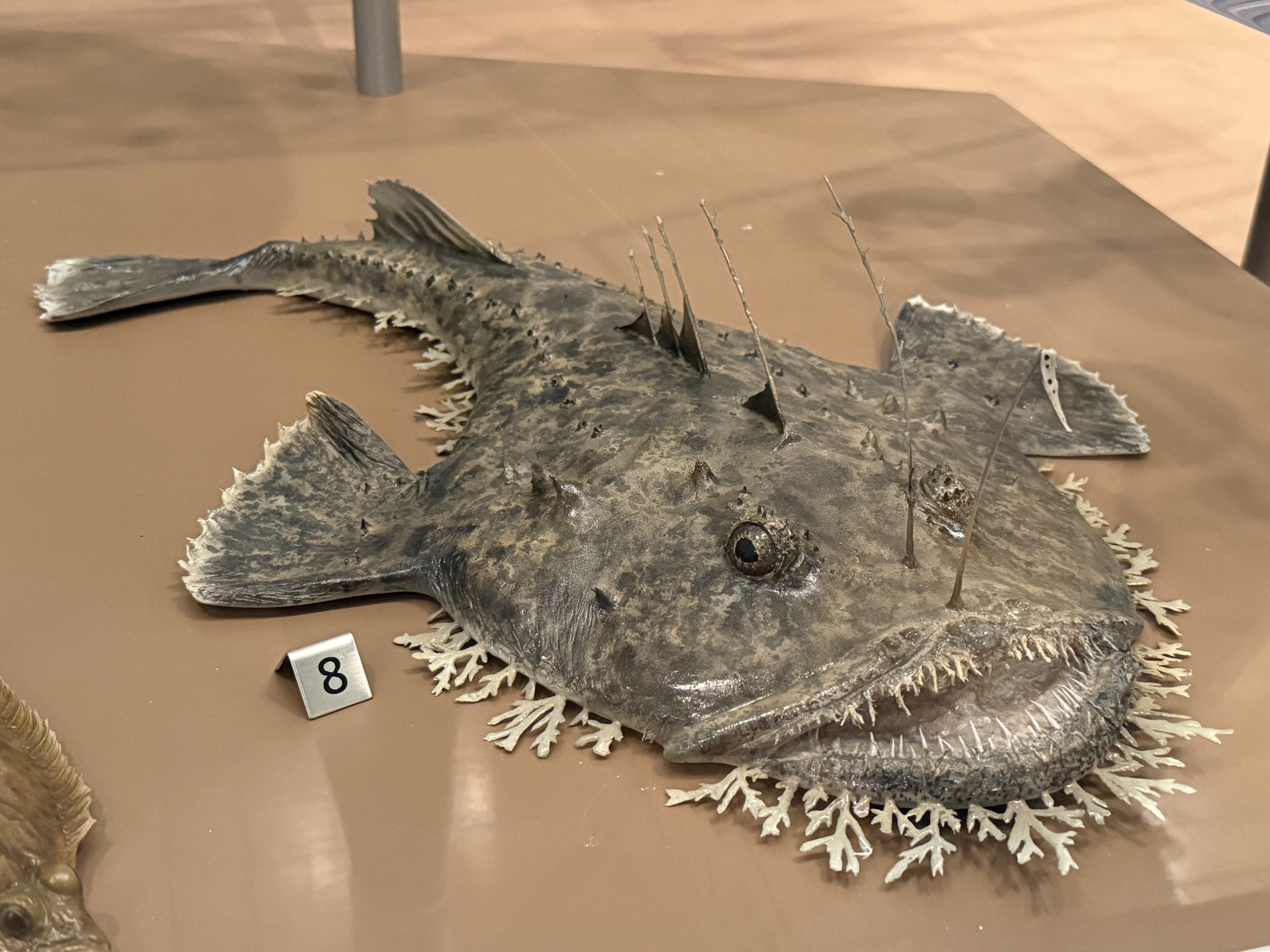
Taxidermied Lophius americanus showing the often hidden dorsal spines

Lophius monkfishes are characterised by having highly compressed heads and bodies. The frontal ridges have a covering of low, blunt knobs or cross ridges. There is a large spine on the parietal bone and there are spines on the lower quadrate bone. The soft-rayed portion of the dorsal fin has between 9 and 12 rays and the anal fin has between 8 and 10 rays. The gill opening reaches below and to the rear of the base of the pectoral fin. There are 6 dorsal spines, those on the head are well developed but those behind the head are very small. There are two well-developed spines on the sphenotic bone and one on the epiotic bone. There is a single spine on the joint at the front of the jaw joint and a single interopercular spine. The humeral spine is also well-developed and has 2 or 3 smaller spines on it.

The largest species in the genus is the angler (L. piscatorius), with a maximum published standard length of 200 cm (79 in), while the smallest is the blackfin goosefish (L. gastrophysus) with a maximum published total length of 67 cm (26 in).

== Reproduction ==
The spawn of this genus consists of a thin sheet of transparent gelatinous material 60–100 cm (25–40 in) wide and 8–10 m (26–33 ft) in length. The eggs in this sheet are in a single layer, each in its own little cavity. The spawn is free in the sea. The larvae are free-swimming and have pelvic fins with elongated filaments.

== Habitat ==
The East Atlantic species is found along the coasts of Europe but becomes scarce beyond 60°N latitude; it also occurs on the coasts of the Cape of Good Hope. The species caught on the North American side of the Atlantic is usually Lophius americanus. A third species (Lophius budegassa), inhabits the Mediterranean, and a fourth (L. setigerus) the coasts of Korea, China and Japan.

The black (L. budegassa) and white (L. piscatorius) anglerfish both live in deep, inshore waters from 800 metres (2,600 ft) to deeper waters (greater than 1,000 metres or 3,300 feet). These two species are very similar, with only a few distinctions between them. These include the colour of the peritoneum (black for L. budegassa and white for L. piscatorius) and the number of rays in the second dorsal fin (L. budegassa, 9–10 and L. piscatorius, 11–12). Also, minor differences in their distribution occur. Black anglerfish tend to have a more southern distribution (Mediterranean and eastern North Atlantic from the British Isles to Senegal). In contrast, the white anglerfish are distributed further north (Mediterranean, Black Sea and eastern North Atlantic from the Barents Sea to the Strait of Gibraltar). Despite these differences, the overall distribution of the black and white anglerfish tend to overlap greatly. A map of the distribution of anglerfish in the waters surrounding Europe and North Africa can be found in the external links section. The movements of both species of anglerfish indicate mixing of both northern and southern species could have strong implications for the geographical boundaries of the stocks from a management perspective.

== Commercial use ==
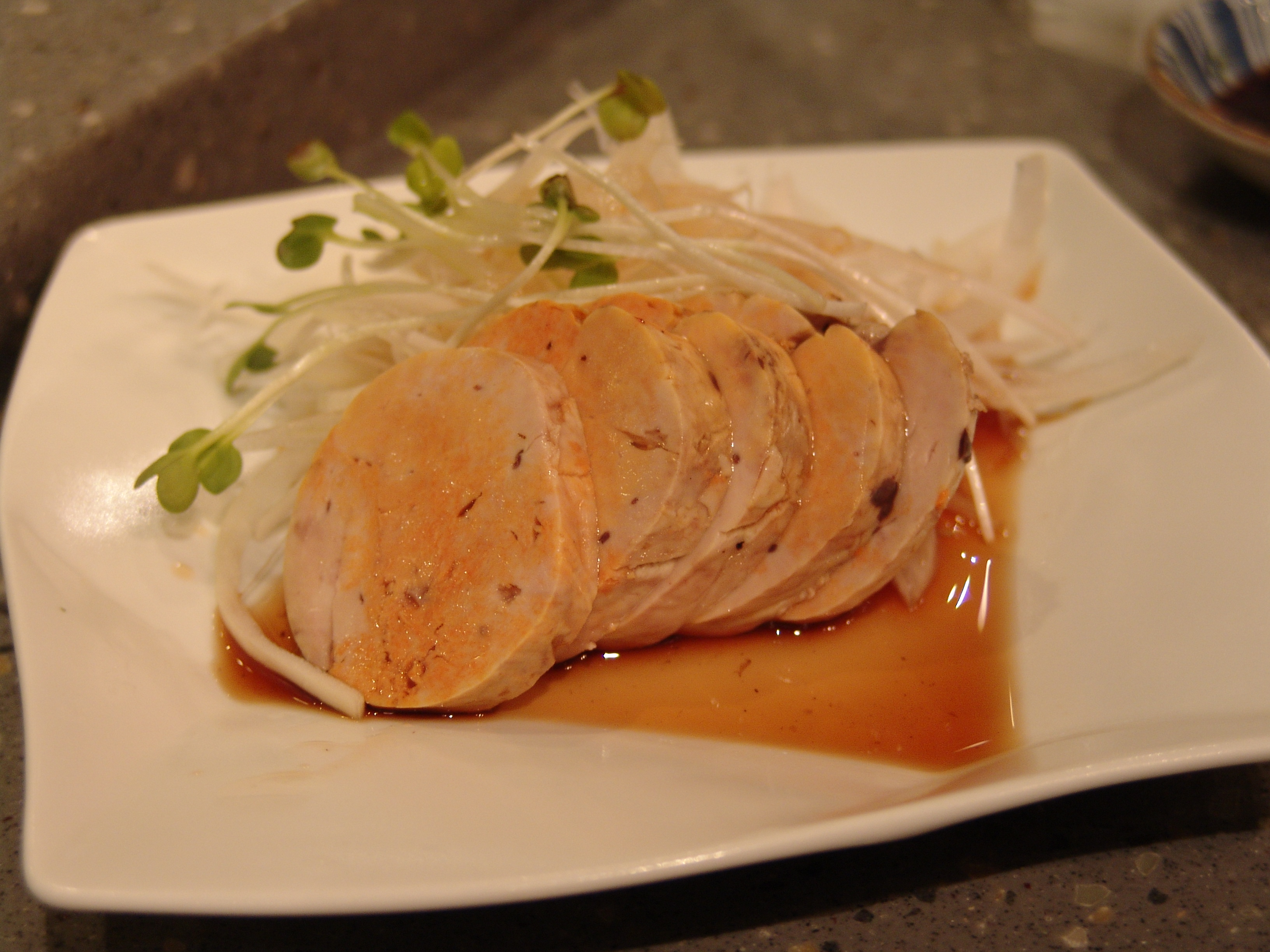
Ankimo, a Japanese delicacy made of monkfish liver

Two species, Lophius piscatorius and Lophius budegassa, found in north-western Europe are referred to as monkfish, with L. piscatorius by far the most common species around the British Isles and of major fishery interest. Under UK Labelling Regulations, the phrase "monkfish" is only permitted for Lophiodes caulinaris, Lophius americanus, Lophius budegassa and Lophius piscatorius.

Both species of Lophius are important because they are commercially valuable species usually caught by trawl and gillnetting fleets.

Concern is expressed over the sustainability of monkfish fishing. The method most commonly used to catch monkfish, beam trawling, has been described as damaging to seafloor habitats. In February 2007, the British supermarket chain Asda banned monkfish from their stores.
