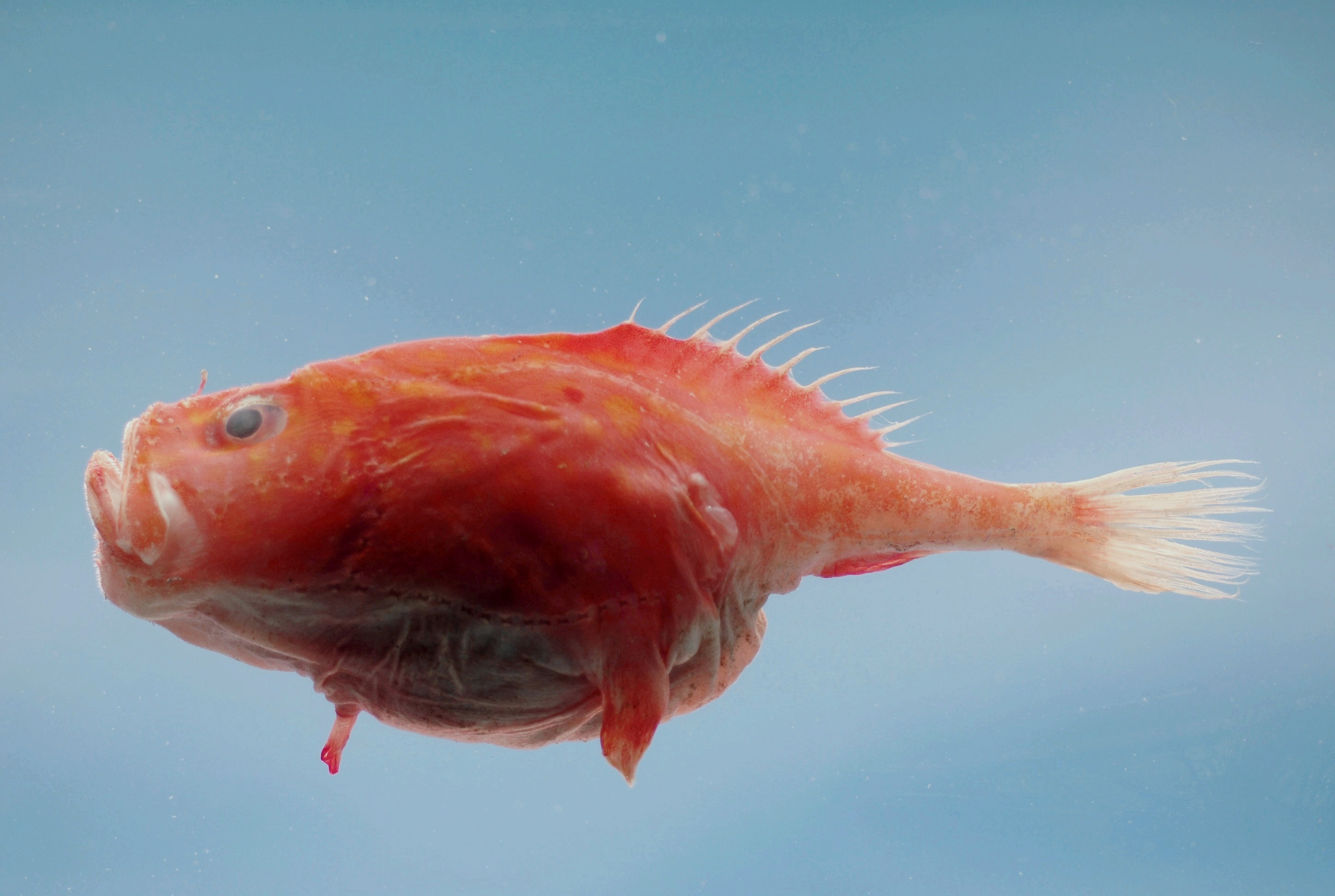
- Chaunax suttkusi

Scientific classification
- Kingdom: Animalia
- Phylum: Chordata
- Class: Actinopterygii
- Order: Lophiiformes
- Family: Chaunacidae
- Genus: Chaunax; R. T. Lowe, 1846

Type species
- Chaunax pictus R. T. Lowe, 1846

= Chaunax =

Genus of fishes

Chaunax, variously known as coffinfishes, gapers, or frogmouths, is a genus of marine ray-finned fishes. It is one of two genera belonging to the family Chaunacidae, the sea toads. They are found in tropical and subtropical oceans around the world, typically in deep water.

== Taxonomy ==
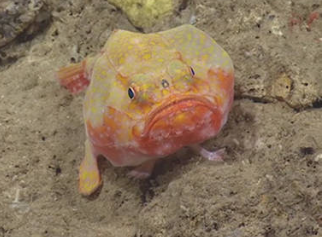
A sea toad of the genus Chaunax along the west wall of Mona Canyon off Puerto Rico on 13 April 2015.

Chaunax was first proposed as a monospecific genus in 1846 by the English naturalist Richard Thomas Lowe when he described Chaunax pictus as a new species from Madeira. There are three species groups within the genus: C. pictus, containing three species; C. abei, containing 17 species; and C. fimbriatus, containing nine species. This genus is classified within the family Chaunacidae, the sea toads, one of two genera in that family. The sea toads are placed within the monotypic suborder Chaunacoidei within the anglerfish order Lophiiformes.

== Etymology ==
Chaunax means "one who gapes", from chanos meaning "to gape", an allusion to the large, wide mouths of these fishes.

== Species ==
There are currently 29 recognized species in this genus:

- Chaunax abei Y. Le Danois, 1978
- Chaunax africanus H.-C. Ho & Last, 2013 (African coffinfish) (African coffinfish)
- Chaunax albatrossae H.-C. Ho & W. C. Ma, 2022 (Albatross frogmouth)
- Chaunax apus Lloyd, 1909 (Southern frogmouth)
- Chaunax atimovatae H.-C. Ho & W. C. Ma, 2016
- Chaunax brachysomus H.-C. Ho, Kawai & Satria, 2015 (Short-body frogmouth)
- Chaunax breviradius Y. Le Danois, 1978
- Chaunax endeavouri Whitley, 1929 (Furry coffinfish)
- Chaunax erythraeus H.-C. Ho & W. C. Ma, 2022 (Red eyebrow frogmouth)
- Chaunax fimbriatus Hilgendorf, 1879 (Tasselled coffinfish)
- Chaunax flammeus Y. Le Danois, 1979
- Chaunax flavomaculatus H.-C. Ho, C. D. Roberts & A. L. Stewart, 2013 (Yellowspot frogmouth)
- Chaunax gomoni H.-C. Ho, Kawai & Satria, 2015 (Gomon's frogmouth)
- Chaunax heemstraorum H.-C. Ho & W. C. Ma, 2016 (Heemstra's frogmouth)
- Chaunax hollemani H.-C. Ho & W. C. Ma, 2016 (Holleman's frogmouth)
- Chaunax latipunctatus Y. Le Danois, 1984
- Chaunax mulleus H.-C. Ho, C. D. Roberts & A. L. Stewart, 2013 (Redshoes frogmouth)
- Chaunax multilepis H.-C. Ho, Meleppura & Bineesh, 2016 (Indian spotted coffinfish)
- Chaunax nebulosus H.-C. Ho & Last, 2013 (Eye-spot coffinfish)
- Chaunax nudiventer H.-C. Ho & K. T. Shao, 2010 (Naked-belly coffinfish)
- Chaunax obscurus H.-C. Ho & W. C. Ma, 2022 (Black-mouth frogmouth)
- Chaunax penicillatus McCulloch, 1915 (Pencil coffinfish)
- Chaunax pictus R. T. Lowe, 1846 (Pink frogmouth)
- Chaunax reticulatus H.-C. Ho, C. D. Roberts & A. L. Stewart, 2013 (Netted frogmouth)
- Chaunax russatus H.-C. Ho, C. D. Roberts & A. L. Stewart, 2013 (Red coffinfish)
- Chaunax stigmaeus Fowler, 1946 (Red-eye gaper)
- Chaunax suttkusi J. H. Caruso, 1989
- Chaunax umbrinus C. H. Gilbert, 1905
- Chaunax viridiretis H.-C. Ho & W. C. Ma, 2022 (Green-net frogmouth)

== Characteristics ==
Chaunax sea toads have a rotund, slightly laterally flattened body which tapers to a small rounded caudal fin. The head is large and globelike with a large oblique mouth and eyes set high on the head. The eyes are covered in transparent skin, resembling a window. The teeth in the mouth are vertical, small, thin, and sharp. There is a single visible dorsal spine, the illicium, which is relatively short, sits in an oval-shaped depression on the snout, and is tipped with a tuft of filaments, the esca, or lure. The two other dorsal spines are embedded in the skin. The dorsal fin is located on the rear of the body and is supported by 10 or 12 soft rays, while the anal fin contains 6 or 7 soft rays. The loose, flabby skin has a dense covering of very small denticles. The lateral line is open and runs from the caudal peduncle to the head, with obvious canals connecting to branches under the eye, on the chin, and along the lower flanks. The main part of the lateral line on the upper body contains between 29 and 42 pores, with between 11 and 13 pores on the head. These are mostly rather small species, with the largest being C. picus, with a maximum published total length of 40 cm (16 in), while the smallest is C. breviradius, which has a maximum published standard length of 11 cm (4.3 in).

== Distribution and habitat ==
Chaunax anglerfishes are found in all three oceans of the world. They are benthic fishes, found at depths between 90 and 2,000 m (300 and 6,560 ft).

== Biology ==
Chaunax coffinfishes are only distantly related to the frogfishes of the family Antennariidae but have a similar lifestyle as ambush predators, luring prey to within striking distance of their large mouth with the illicium and esca, and using their pectoral and pelvic fins to walk along the bottom. At least one species, C. endeavouri, has been observed inflating its gill chambers by holding onto water. The retained water can inflate their gill chambers so that their bodies become as much as 30% larger, and this water can be retained for lengths of time from 26 seconds up to 4 minutes. These deep-water ambush predators rely on prey coming close enough to strike, which can be infrequent, so the ability to hold water in the gills for longer may be an adaptation to preserve energy while breathing, as well as possibly being a defence against predators. However, the fishes cannot keep the water within the gill chambers if bitten by a predator.
