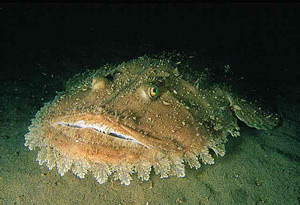

Conservation status
- Data Deficient (IUCN 3.1)

Scientific classification
- Kingdom: Animalia
- Phylum: Chordata
- Class: Actinopterygii
- Order: Lophiiformes
- Family: Lophiidae
- Genus: Lophius
- Species: L. budegassa

Binomial name
- Lophius budegassa Spinola, 1807

Synonyms
- Lophius piscatorius budegassa Spinola, 1807; Lophius parvipinnis Cuvier, 1829

= Lophius budegassa =

Species of fish

Lophius budegassa, the blackbellied angler or blackbellied monkfish, is a species of marine ray-finned fish belonging to the family Lophiidae, the goosefishes, monkfishes and anglers. This species is found in the eastern Atlantic Ocean and the Mediterranean Sea.

== Taxonomy ==
Lophius budegassa was first formally described in 1807 by the Italian biologist Maximilian Spinola with its type locality given as the Gulf of Genoa. The genus Lophius is one of 4 extant genera in the family Lophiidae which the 5th edition of Fishes of the World classifies in the monotypic suborder Lophioidei with the order Lophiiformes.

== Etymology ==
Lophius budegassa has the genus name Lophius, which means "mane" and is presumably a reference to the first three spines of the first dorsal fin which are tentacle like, with three smaller spines behind them. The specific name budegassa is derived from budegasso, a vernacular name for this species along the Gulf of Genoa in Italy.

== Description ==
Lophius budegassa has a very large, flattened head with a wide mouth which contains a number of large, recurved, sharp teeth. There are 6 dorsal fin spines with the first three located on the head being separate and not enclosed in a membrane. The second dorsal fin has 9 or 10 soft rays. The first dorsal spine is the illicium and has an esca which is a simple pennant like flap. The anal fin has 8 or 9 soft rays. The head has 3 large spines on its side immediately above and in front of the pectoral fins and there are large flaps of skin over the eyes. The colour of the upper body varies from light brown to dark brown with dark blotches. The lower body is very pale and the black peritoneum can be seen through it. This species has a maximum published standard length of 100 cm (39 in), although a total length of 50 cm (20 in) is more typical.

== Distribution and habitat ==
Lophius budegassa is found in the northeastern Atlantic Ocean from north of Scotland and southern Norway to Senegal and in the Mediterranean. It is a bathydemersal fish found at depths between 70 and 1,013 m (230 and 3,323 ft), typically between 100 and 500 m (330 and 1,640 ft), the deepest fish were found in the Aegean Sea.

== Biology ==
Lophius budegassa has been found to spawn between November and February off the Atlantic coast of Spain but very few mature females were found during the season, suggesting that the females migrate to other geographical areas or different depths to breed. Males attain sexual maturity at 7 years old and a length of 38.6 cm (15.2 in) while for females it is reached at 9 or 10 years old and at a length of 53.6 cm (21.1 in). The spawn is within a buoyant gelatinous mass, the larvae and post-larvae are found among the plankton.

This is a piscivorous fish, an ambush predator, that is opportunistic and not selective. In the northern Adriatic the European hake (Merluccius merluccius) is the favoured prey of adults, while the most common prey of smaller specimens was the rockling, Gaidropsarus biscayensis. Another study, conducted off Tunisia, found that 73 species were preyed on and European hake, Mediterranean horse mackerel (Trachurus mediterraneus) and Atlantic horse mackerel (T. trachurus) were the most commonly taken prey species. In the Levant Sea the most common prey were the deep-water rose prawn (Parapenaeus longirostris) and the green-eyed shortnose (Chlorophthalmus agassizi).

== Fisheries and conservation ==
Lophius budegassa is a valued food fish and is targeted by commercial fisheries, especially off Spain and Portugal. In the southern part of its range it is mainly taken as bycatch in prawn trawl fisheries. The blackbellied angler is long-lived, attains sexual maturity at a late age and is slow to reproduce and these life history traits make it vulnerable to overfishing, and there are indications that in some areas the stock has been overfished. For example, landings in Mauritania have declined by 96%. However, there is no reliable data on the population trends and the International Union for Conservation of Nature have classified this species as Data Deficient,
