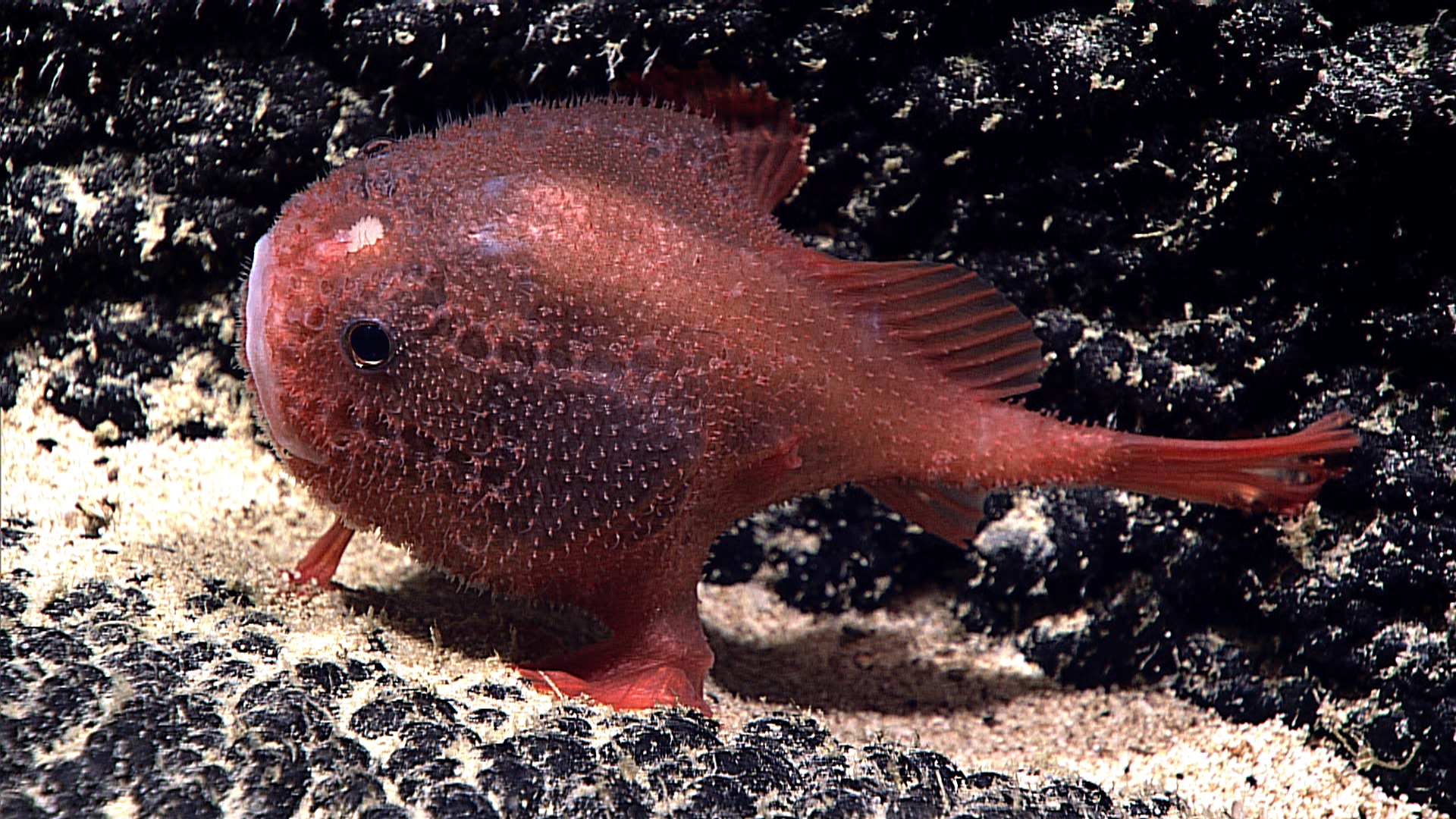
- Chaunacops cf. melanostomus

Scientific classification
- Kingdom: Animalia
- Phylum: Chordata
- Class: Actinopterygii
- Division: Teleostei
- Order: Lophiiformes
- Suborder: Chaunacoidei; Pietsch & Grobecker, 1987
- Family: Chaunacidae; Gill, 1863

Genera
- Chaunacops; Chaunax

= Sea toad =

Family of fishes

The sea toads and coffinfishes are a family, the Chaunacidae, of deep-sea ray-finned fishes belonging to the monotypic suborder Chaunacoidei within the order Lophiiformes, the anglerfishes. These are bottom-dwelling fishes found on the continental slopes of the Atlantic, Indian, and Pacific Oceans, at depths to at least 2,460 m (8,070 ft). There have also been findings of deep-sea anglerfishes off the coasts of Australia and New Caledonia. Other findings suggest some genera of Chaunacidae are found near volcanic slopes encrusted with manganese. Of the two genera in the family, Chaunacops are typically found at deeper depths than Chaunax, but with considerable overlap between the two genera.

== Taxonomy ==
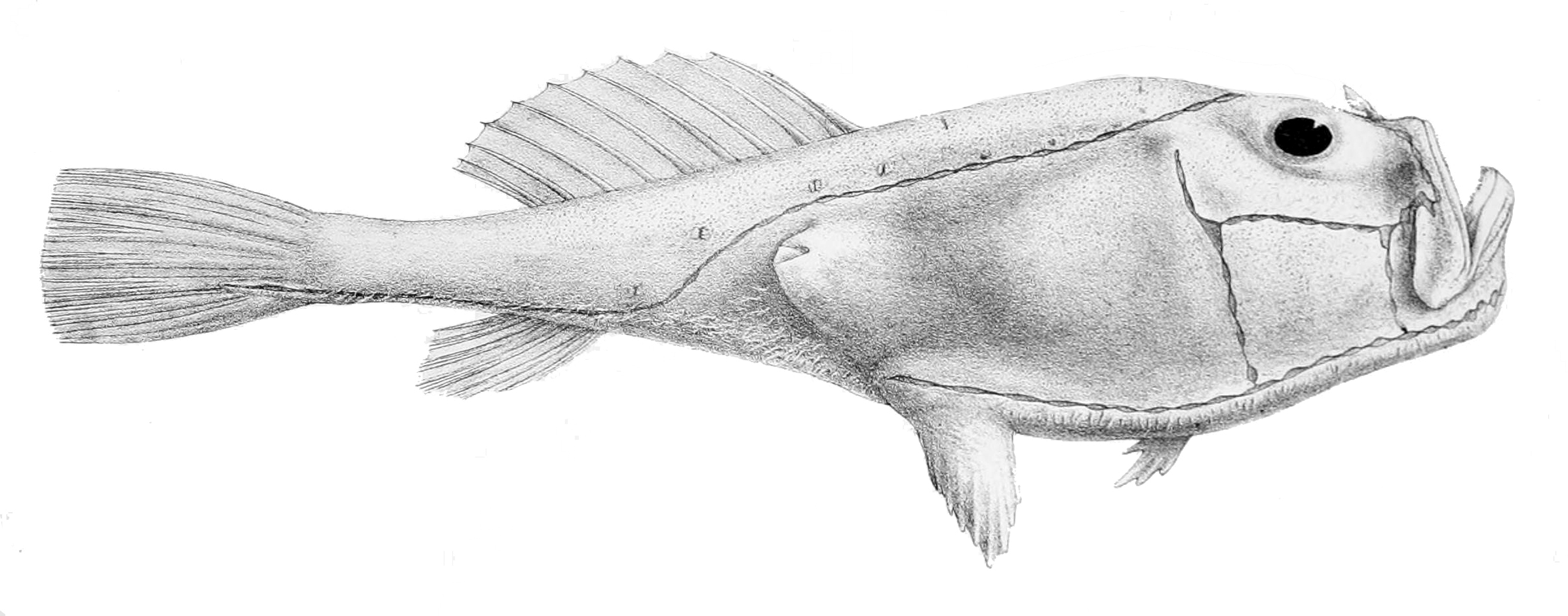
Chaunax pictus

The sea toads were first proposed as a separate family, the Chaunacidae, by the American biologist Theodore Gill in 1863. Charles Tate Regan placed this family within the division Antennariformes within his suborder Lophiodea when he classified the order Pediculati, his grouping of the toadfishes and anglerfishes. In 1981 Theodore Wells Piestch III realised that the monophyly of Regan's 1912 groupings within his Lophoidea had not been confirmed. Pietsch proposed a sister relationship between the sea toads and the Ogcocephalidae, however, was unable to identify any grouping that was a sister group to both the Chaunacidae and Ogcocephalidae nor did he find any osteological characters to support or otherwise their classification within the Antennariiformes. He, tenatively, retained both groups within the Antennarioidei even although he was unable to establish the monophyly of the four families Regan classified in the Antennariiformes in 1912. In 1987 Pietsch and David B. Grobecker classified the seatoads in the monotypic suborder Chaunacoidei within the Lophiiformes. This is the classification followed by the 5th edition of Fishes of the World.

== Etymology ==
The sea toad family, Chaunacidae, is named for its type genus Chaunax, this name means "one who gapes", from chanos meaning "to gape", an allusion to the large, wide mouths of these fishes.

== Genera ==
The sea toads are divided into two genera:

- Chaunacops Garman, 1899
- Chaunax Lowe 1846

== Description ==
Sea toads have large, globose bodies and short, compressed tails, and are covered with small, spiny scales. The largest are about 30 cm (12 in) in length. During their gill ventilatory cycle, Chaunacidae are able to take in high volumes of water, increasing their total body volume by 30%. The first dorsal fin ray is modified into a short bioluminescent lure which dangles forward over the mouth, which is turned upwards so as to be nearly vertical. The sensory canals of the lateral lines are especially conspicuous. Chaunax have modified fins which resemble legs. It was also found that they use these modified pelvic fins to assist with maneuvering their swimming, especially when as an escape response. Chaunacops have shorter lures that resemble a cue-tip that sits between their eyes. Their bodies are covered in lots of small needles that are thought to offer protection or sensory signaling sites. Despite the spiky nature of the needles they give the fish a fuzzy crocheted disposition making them quite visually distinct. Similar to the Chaunax, they also have modified fins that allow them to walk along the sea floor which is thought to provide both a hunting and metabolic advantage.

Sea toads are mostly sedentary fish, and rely on a more opportunistic way of hunting where they prey on anything within reach. The sensory canals of the lateral lines are especially conspicuous, and confers advantages in avoidance of predators and consumption of prey.

== Sexual dimorphism ==
A species from Chaunacidae, Chaunacops melanostomus, exhibits a single trait showing sexual dimorphism. Sample collection shows that males tend to have larger nostrils than females, and even in the smallest males, nostrils tend to be very apparent.

== Distribution and habitat ==
Three species of Chaunocops are currently known, all of which live in the Indo-west Pacific Ocean. There are C. coloratus, C. melanostomus and C. spinosus. However, members of the family Chaunacidae have been collected from the Eastern Indian Ocean, the Eastern Pacific Ocean, and the Western Atlantic Ocean, showing that this family is relatively widely distributed. Namely, in 1989 a study was done by John H. Caruso in which 21 specimens of Chaunacid fish were collected off the western coast of Australia, many of which were collected at approximately -30° latitude, and approximately 90° longitude. These specimen were from the genus Bathychaunax, which before this study only contained 2 other species: B. coloratus of the Eastern Pacific, and B. roseus from the Western Atlantic. The new species of Bathychaunax was found at depths between 1320 m and 1760 m. Furthermore, in 2015 an article was published indicating that new specimens from the genus Chaunacops were found off the coasts of Australia and New Caledonia.

In addition, it was found that the Chaunacops coloratus are also often found near "manganese-encrusted volcanic talus slopes". The fish were observed to often have one of their pectoral fins in sediment and another one on a rock in order to make it seem as though they were wedged between two substrates. The average oxygen concentration was found to be about 1.59 mL/L at the depths they were found and the average temperature was about 1.68 °C. Salinity in their habitats did not change much and was found to be an average of 34.64 psu.

== Anatomy ==
=== Chaunacops spinosis ===
Upon collection and examination of this species, it is observed to have several distinct physical attributes. One trait is the fine dermal spinules, along with simple and bifurcate dermal spinules, covering the body. It also has four pectoral lateral-line neuromasts, which are sensory organs characteristic to fish and aquatic organisms. It has a greyish mouth, and semi-transparent, light-greyish skin. Inside the mouth are several rows of teeth. There are three or four rows of small canine teeth on the upper jaw, and three rows of the same on the lower jaw. The skin of the head, belly, and most of gill chamber is dark blue, and it has a relatively short tail. The overall bodily structure resembles that of a tadpole, with a more globular shape in the anterior which tapers in the posterior. The eyes are covered by transparent skin and are very small.

=== Chaunacops melanostomus ===
Another species in the same genus was collected with similar traits to the above species, but some noticeable differences. The spinules are distributed widely throughout the body, similar to C. spinosis, but are simple with a large base (different from that of C. spinosis which has simple as well as bifurcate dermal spindles). They also differ slightly in color. The inside of the mouth, the head, the gill chamber, and the anterior portion of the body are dark brown to black. The dorsal side of the body, and the caudal fin are light brown, and becomes more lightly colored going towards the posterior end. Also, instead of having three or four rows of teeth, C. melanostomus has two rows on both jaws. The general body plan, however, is virtually the same, resembling a tadpole, with a more globular shape in the anterior which tapers in the posterior.

=== Chaunacops coloratus ===
The Chaunacops coloratus are another species that were discovered and are known for their bright red and blue colors. It was found that the blue C. coloratus often had an average length of about 110 mm, whereas the red specimen had an average length of 184 mm. It was observed that the specimen begin in a transparent larval form, then become blue, and eventually reach their adult red color. As for predation, it is hypothesized that the specimen turning red is advantageous for ambushing predators that use bioluminescent light to attract possible prey, since the red coloration of this specimen would conceal the predator and make it invisible.

== Movement ==
=== C. coloratus ===
Through observations made by an ROV, it was found that the C. coloratus swim vertically with their head oriented upwards. While in rapid ascent, the specimen will use their dorsal, caudal, and anal fins to propel themselves upwards and tuck the rest of their fins in close to their body. The observation collected found that the specimen had average velocities of 0.036 m/s and 0.021 m/s while ascending. As for maneuvering across the ocean floor, observations found that the specimen use their pectoral and pelvic fins. In order to perform this "walking", they use their dorsal fin from one side to side, then thrust their caudal fin repeatedly, and then maneuver using their pectoral and pelvic fins. It was also observed that these specimen are capable of walking backwards using their pectoral and pelvic fins.

== Breathing ==
Fish of the family Chaunacidae have been shown to have slow ventilatory cycles in which the fish exhales 20–30% of their body volume of water. Upon inhalation, Chaunacidae can endure long periods of time maintaining a fully inflated gill chamber, sometimes up to 245 seconds which confers many potential advantages for fish of this family. Chaunacidae have been found to contain a specialized apparatus containing adductor muscles that can maintain its ventilatory cycle, and control the volume of water entering and exiting. These muscles are cross-hatched, and function to not only inhale and exhale, but to prevent any leakage out of the gills.

Due to the high-volume and slow ventilatory cycle, Chaunacidae are able to be majorly energy efficient as they require less energy to push water across the surface of their gills. Because of this, Chaunacidae are able to go without prey for long periods of time, and remain mostly sedentary.

There are many other hypotheses of advantages conferred by the breathing cycle of Chaunacidae. Due to the long periods of high-volume inhalation, Chaunacidae makes little disturbance of lateral line systems, allowing for better hunting and avoidance of predators. In addition, the maximally filled mouth of the Chaunacidae is often intimidating to predators, making it a defense mechanism that the fish can use much like the pufferfish.

== Diet ==
Chaunacidae are known to be mostly sedentary fish, and spend most of their time dormant on the seafloor. Because of their energy efficient way of ventilation, Chaunacidae are able to go long periods of time with little food. In a diet study, Chaunax fimbriatus was found to contain a stomach that contained many different prey, showing that Chaunacidae are opportunistic hunters that will eat most anything it can on the seafloor.

Chaunacidae are also steady hunters, as they are able to maintain relatively low movement. Due to their gill chambers, Chaunacidae are able to remain still enough until their prey is within distance.
