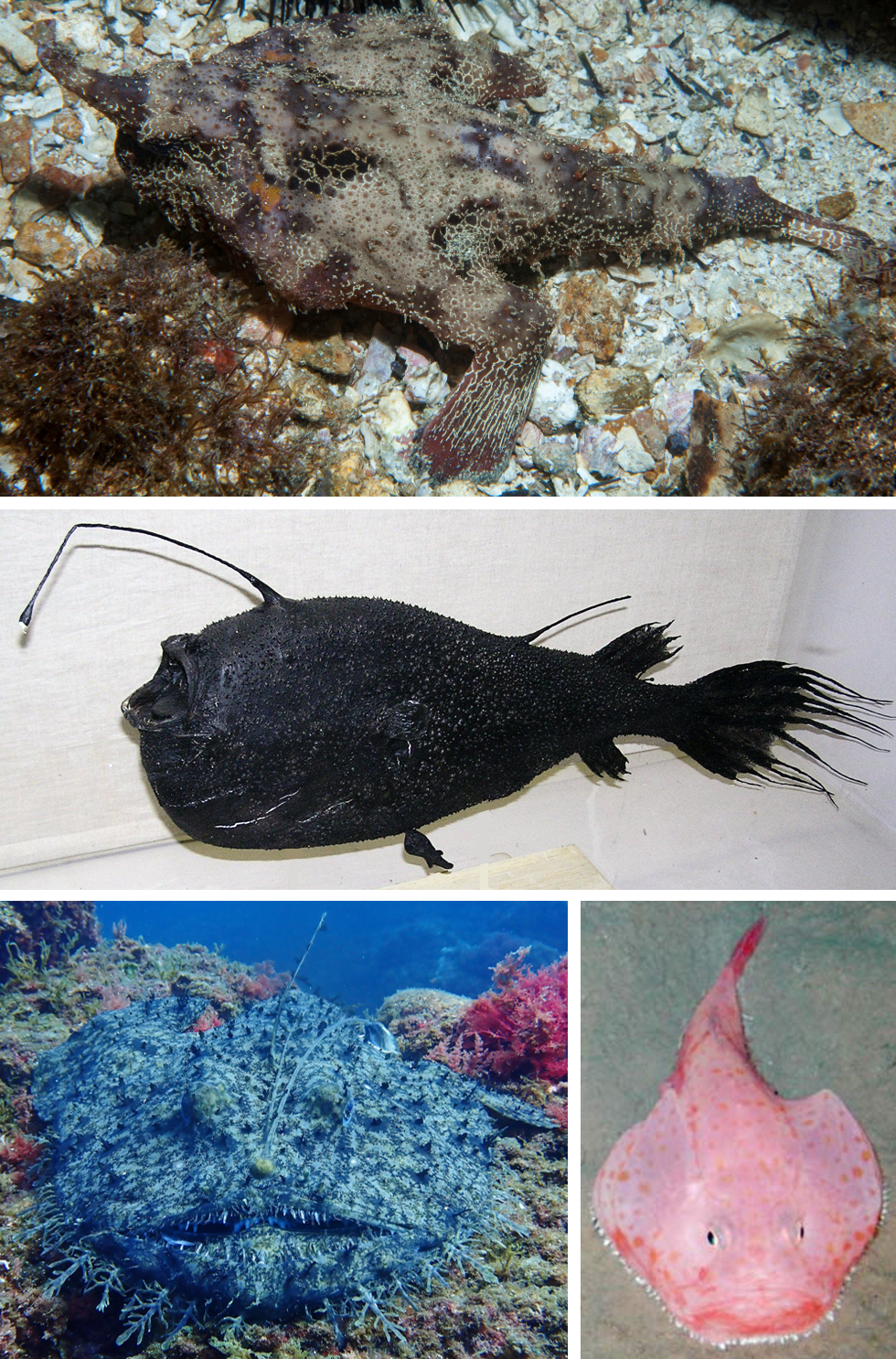
- Type species of 4 lophiiform suborders (Note: These being Ogcocephalus vespertilio, Ceratias holboelli, Lophius piscatorius, and Chaunax pictus. The type species of the genus Antennarius needs clarification)

Scientific classification
- Kingdom: Animalia
- Phylum: Chordata
- Class: Actinopterygii
- Division: Teleostei
- Clade: Percomorpha
- Order: Lophiiformes; Sedgwick et al., 1905

Type species
- Lophius piscatorius Linnaeus, 1758

Synonyms
- Pediculati Müller, 1839 (pro parte)

= Anglerfish =

Anglerfish Temporal range: Early Eocene–present Probable Cretaceous origin

Ray-finned fish with a natural luring appendage

The anglerfish are ray-finned fish in the order Lophiiformes (/ˌlɒfiɪˈfɔːrmiːz/). Both the order's common and scientific name come from the characteristic mode of predation, in which a modified dorsal fin ray acts as a lure for prey (akin to a human angler, and this lure is also likened to a crest or "lophos"). The modified fin ray, with the very tip being the esca and the length of the structure the illicium, is adapted to attract specific prey items depending on the species, through the employment of different luring methods.

Anglerfish occur in marine waters worldwide, from tropical seas to polar regions, and live in both shallow water habitats and the deep sea. Many species are benthic or demersal, including monkfishes, batfishes, frogfishes, and sea toads; these groups use enlarged pectoral and/or pelvic fins to rest on or move across the seabed. In contrast, the deep-sea anglerfish lack pelvic fins and are pelagic, swimming and drifting in the water column.

Anglerfish are notable for their sexual dimorphism, which is sometimes extremely pronounced; the females may be several orders of magnitude larger in mass than males. In the deep-sea anglerfish, this dimorphism has enabled a unique reproductive method, where the male attaches to the much larger female, sometimes fusing together as an example of natural parabiosis. This phenomenon is known as sexual parasitism.

Anglerfish are of some commercial value, with many species being of interest to aquaria. The lophiid anglerfish (marketed as monkfish, goosefish, or simply angler) are fished commercially as their meat is highly valued, being considered a delicacy throughout the world.

== Taxonomy ==
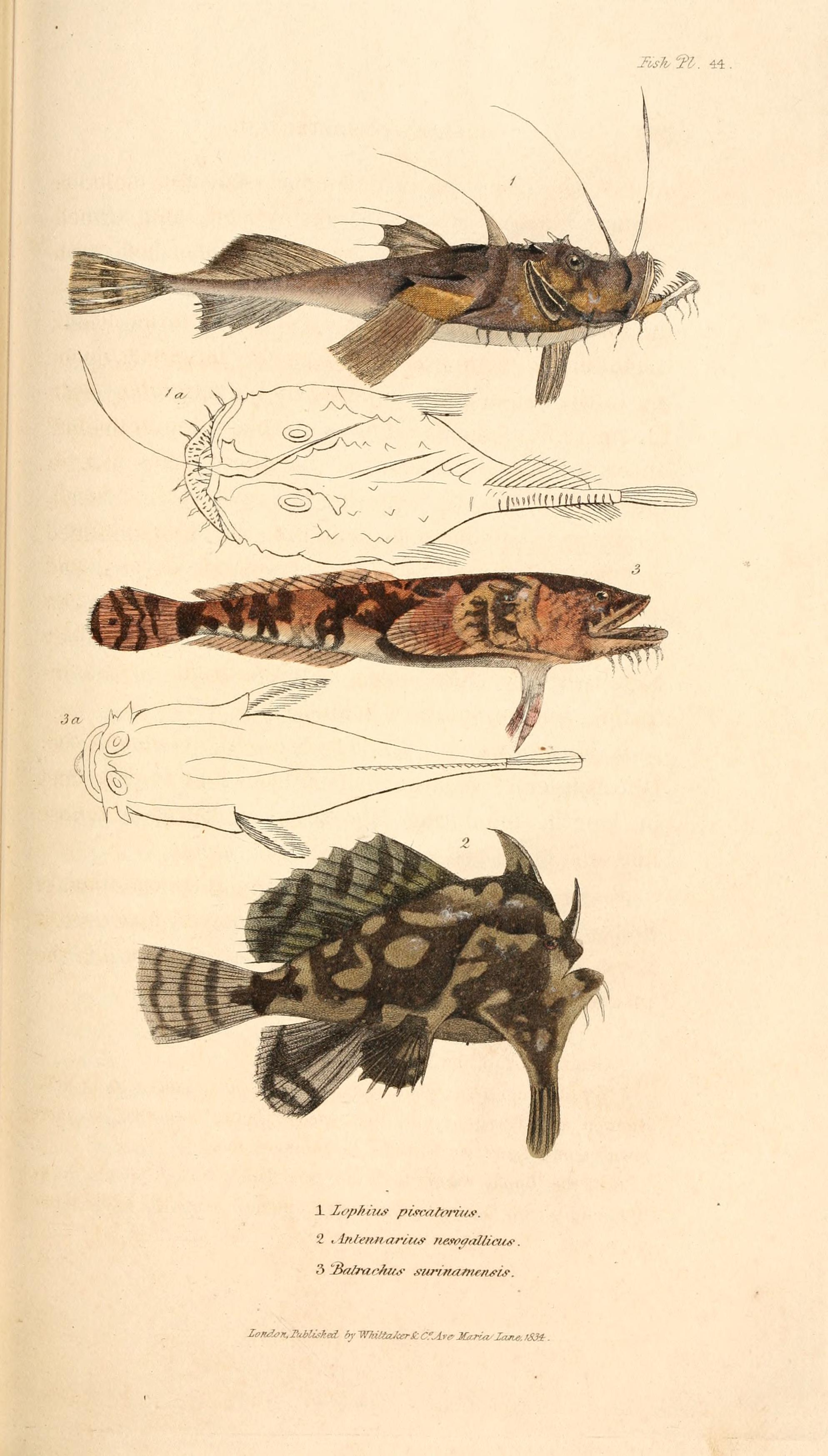
Pediculati plate, Le Règne Animal. Toadfish (Batrachoididae) such as Batrachoides surinamensis (middle) are no longer considered close to anglerfish

Anglerfish were first grouped in the family of Acanthopterygians with "pediculate pectoral [fin]s" (pectorales pédiculėes) by Cuvier in the 1829 edition of Le Règne Animal; being characterized by possessing "a sort of arm supporting their pectorals, formed by an elongated carpal bone". Cuvier placed the genera Lophius (incl. Lophius piscatorius), Chironectes/Antennarius (incl. various subspecies of Lophius histrio), Malthe (incl. Lophius vespertilio), and Batrachus within this family. Translations of this work into English and Latin renderred the family name as "Pectorales Pediculati"; which was eventually truncated into Pediculati or Pediculata (pediculate fish), these names being used to classify anglerfish through 1926. Though this term saw use in publications as late as the 1970s, Pediculati has fallen out of use.

The group Lophidia was conceived by Samuel Garman in 1899; this group was subdivided into the Lophioids (incl. Lophius, Lophiomus, Melanocetus, Dolopichthys, Chaunax, and Chaunacops) and the Halieutoids (incl. Oncocephalus, Halieutaea, Halieutella, Halieutichthys, Halieutopsis, Halicmetus, Dibranchus, Dibranchichthys, and Malthopsis) based on the orientation of the ilicium's base. By 1905, Lophiiformes came into use, at that time being a suborder of Pediculati.

=== Classification ===
The following classification is based on Eschmeyer's Catalog of Fishes (2025):

- Suborder Lophioidei Regan, 1912
  - Family Lophiidae Rafinesque, 1810 (monkfishes and goosefishes)
- Suborder Ogcocephaloidei Pietsch, 1984
  - Family Ogcocephalidae Gill, 1893 (batfishes)
- Suborder Antennarioidei Regan, 1912
  - Family Antennariidae Jarocki, 1822 (frogfishes)
    - Subfamily Fowlerichthyinae Maile, Smith & Davis, 2025 (fanfin frogfishes)
    - Subfamily Antennariinae Jarocki, 1822 (Fibonacci frogfishes)
    - Subfamily Lophichthyinae Boeseman, 1964 (lophichthyin frogfishes)
    - Subfamily Tathicarpinae Hart, Arnold, Alda, Kenaley, Pietsch, Hutchinson & Chakrabarty, 2022 (longfin frogfishes)
    - Subfamily Tetrabrachiinae Regan, 1912 (tetrabrachiid frogfishes)
    - Subfamily Histiophryninae Arnold & Pietsch, 2012 (starfingered frogfishes)
    - Subfamily Rhycherinae Hart, Arnold, Alda, Kenaley, Pietsch, Hutchinson & Chakrabarty, 2022 (Balrog frogfishes)
    - Subfamily Brachionichthyinae Gill, 1863 (handfishes)
- Suborder Chaunacoidei Pietsch & Grobecker, 1987
  - Family Chaunacidae Gill, 1863 (gapers or sea toads)
- Suborder Ceratioidei Regan, 1912
  - Family Caulophrynidae Goode & Bean, 1896 (fanfins)
  - Family Neoceratiidae Regan, 1926 (spiny seadevils)
  - Family Melanocetidae Gill, 1878 (black seadevils)
  - Family Himantolophidae Gill, 1861 (footballfishes)
  - Family Diceratiidae Regan & Trewavas, 1932 (double anglers)
  - Family Oneirodidae Gill, 1878 (dreamers)
  - Family Thaumatichthyidae Smith & Radcliffe, 1912 (wolftrap anglers)
  - Family Centrophrynidae Bertelsen, 1951 (prickly seadevils)
  - Family Ceratiidae Gill, 1861 (warty seadevils)
  - Family Gigantactinidae Boulenger, 1904 (whipnose anglers)
  - Family Linophrynidae Regan, 1925 (leftvents)

Alternatively, Lophiiformes may be treated as clade within Acanthuriformes; a 2025 paper defines Lophioidei as equivalent to the prior conception of Lophiiformes (the one depicted above) and converts the suborders into infraorders (as seen below). Below are two cladograms; the left one is based on a phylogeny which elaborates on the relationships of the suborders within Lophiiformes as set out in Pietsch and Grobecker's 1987 Frogfishes of the World: Systematics, Zoogeography, and Behavioral Ecology, while the right is based on Maile et al's 2025 phylogenetic study which combines the analysis of Ultra-Conserved Elements (UCE)s, mitochondrial DNA, and morphological evidence;

- Lophiiformes
  - Lophioidei
  - - - Antennarioidei
      - - Chaunacoidei
        - - Ogcocephaloidei
          - Ceratioidei

- Acanthuriformes
  - Antigoniidae
  - - - Tetraodontoidei
    - - Lophioidei _{(sensu Maile et al)}
        - Lophioideo
        - - - Antennarioideo
            - Ogcocephaloideo
          - - Chaunacoideo
            - Ceratioideo

Phylogenetic studies have consistently recovered the Lophiiformes as sister-group to the Tetraodontiformes, with both within the larger clade Acanthuriformes as of 2025. The Lophiiformes and Tetraodontiformes are united by several derived morphological features separating them from other Acanthuriformes, including restricted gill openings, along with the absence of multiple skeletal elements, some examples are spines supporting the anal fin, ribs, nasals, and basisphenoid.

== Evolution ==
The earliest fossils of anglerfish are from the Eocene, excavated from the Monte Bolca formation of Italy, and these already show evidence of diversification into the modern families that make up the order. Given this, and their close relationship to the Tetraodontiformes which are known from Cretaceous fossils, they likely originated during the Cretaceous.

A 2010 mitochondrial genome phylogenetic study suggested the anglerfishes diversified in a short period during the early to mid-Cretaceous, between 130 and 100 million years ago. A 2023 preprint reduces this time to the Late Cretaceous, between 92 and 61 million years ago. Other studies indicate that anglerfish only originated shortly after the Cretaceous-Paleogene extinction event as part of a massive adaptive radiation of percomorphs, although this clashes with the extensive diversity already known from the group by the Eocene. A 2024 study found that all anglerfish suborders most likely diverged from one another during the Late Cretaceous and Paleocene, but the multiple families of deep-sea anglerfishes (Ceratioidei), as well as their trademark sexual parasitism, originated during the Eocene in a rapid radiation following the Paleocene-Eocene thermal maximum. Adaptations to different ranges of depths may have driven the evolution of anglerfish species and families in prehistory.

Anglerfish appear in the fossil record as follows:

== Anatomy ==
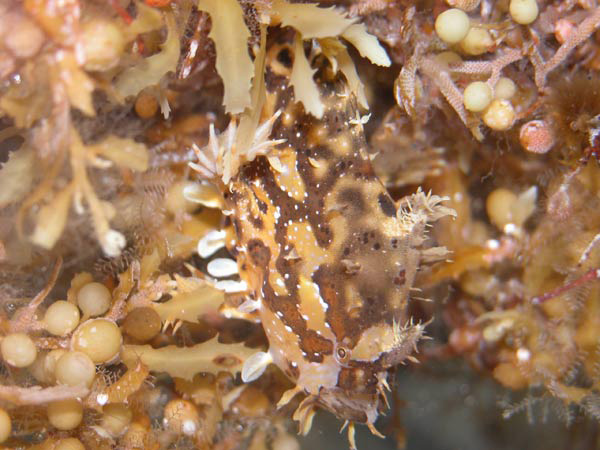
The sargassumfish (Histrio histrio, up to 20 cm (7.9 in) TL) is a frogfish well-adapted to live among sargassum

Anglerfish are defined by gills that open behind the pectoral fins (as opposed to other fish whose pectorals lay behind the gill opening), depressible teeth that can hinge back, joints of the epiotic bone, the form of the pectoral fin radials, and the luring apparatus (see subsection).

The body form of anglerfish vary by habitat and mode of life. Frogfishes are usually short-bodied and use their limb-like pectoral fins to crawl or perch among reef organisms, usually relying on camouflage. Batfishes and sea toads are usually flattened or globose bottom-dwellers that support themselves on modified fins. In contrast, the pelagic deep-sea anglerfishes have reduced locomotory structures and are usually weak swimmers.

Anglerfish lengths can vary from 2–18 cm (1–7 in), with a few species larger than 100 cm (39 in). The largest members are the European monkfish Lophius piscatorius (200 cm (6.6 ft) SL, 57.7 kilograms (127 lb)), the deep-sea warty anglerfish Ceratias holboelli (120 cm (3.9 ft) TL), the giant frogfish Antennarius commerson (45 cm (1.48 ft) TL), and the Atlantic batfish Dibranchus atlanticus (39.4 cm (1.29 ft)).

Many suborders are sexually dimorphic, with the deep-sea anglerfish being the most extreme example; male C. holboelli can reach up to 16 centimetres (6.3 in) long (SL), while females are commonly around 77 centimetres (2.53 ft) TL, potentially weighing an order of magnitude more than her mate. Male Photocorynus spiniceps were measured to be 6.2–7.3 mm (0.24–0.29 in) at maturity, and were at one time claimed to be the smallest vertebrate known. However, due to not being free-living (being parasitic males) and the females being 50.5 mm (1.99 in), they are now often excluded from the records. Sexual dimorphism is not as pronounced in other suborders; the Lophiid monkfish genus Lophiodes are quite similar in size between the genders (Mean for Males 113–133 millimetres (4.4–5.2 in) SL; Females 131–171 millimetres (5.2–6.7 in) SL), and the same is true for Lophius itself (Males 68.50–129.50 centimetres (2.247–4.249 ft); Females 93.50–166.60 centimetres (3.068–5.466 ft)).

Anglerfish are generally ambush predators, with shallow-water species such as frogfish often camouflaging as rocks, sponges or seaweed. To blend in with the featureless dark depths they inhabit, deep-sea anglerfish are dark colored, with tints ranging from grey to brown.

In most species, a wide mouth extends all around the anterior (front) circumference of the head, and bands of inwardly inclined teeth line both jaws. The teeth can be depressed (swept back) so as to offer no impediment to prey gliding towards the stomach, but to still prevent its escape. Anglerfish are able to distend both their jaw and stomach to enormous size, since their bones are thin and flexible, which allows them to swallow prey up to twice as large as their entire bodies.

=== Esca and illicium ===
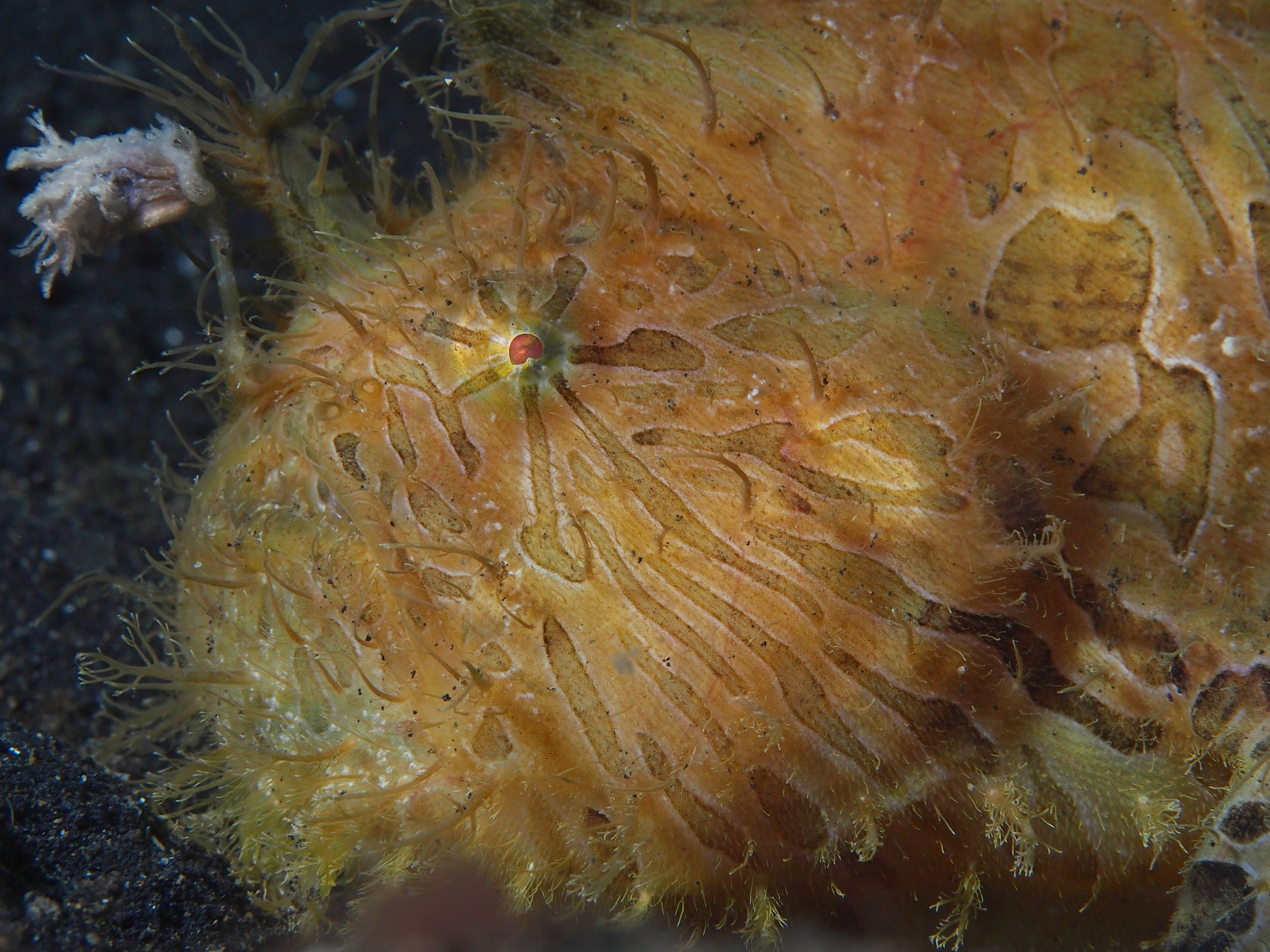
Striated frogfish (Antennarius striatus), displaying the worm-like esca at the top left

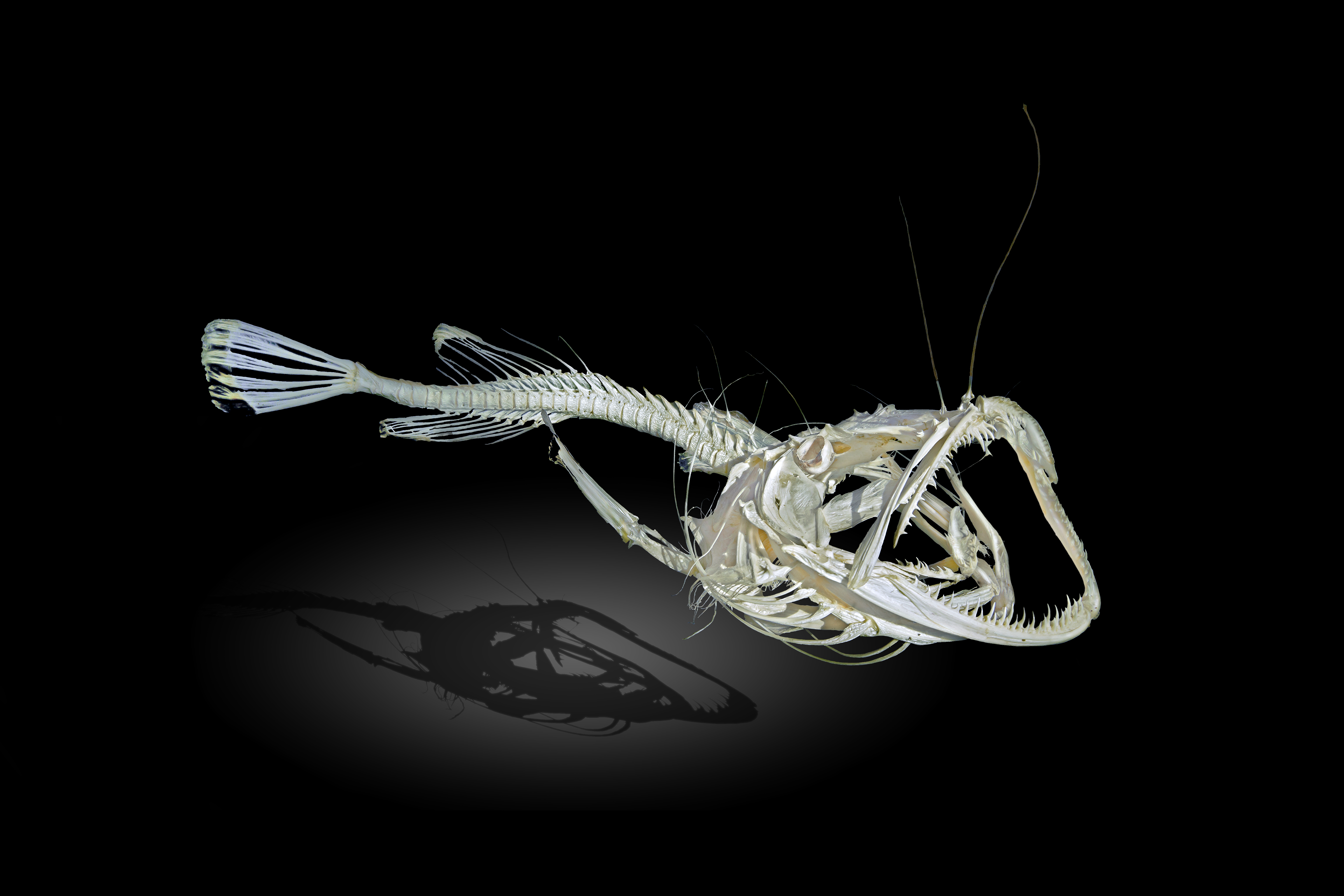
The first fin spine of the monkfish's (Lophius piscatorius) first dorsal fin is the illicium

All anglerfish are carnivorous and are thus adapted for the capture of prey. A character shared by all anglerfish suborders is the presence of a "lure" or "bait", unambiguously referred to as the esca. The esca is the tip of a fin ray, modified from the anterior (foremost) dorsal fin; this fin-ray is often referred to as the "fishing rod" or "fishing line", and is scientifically termed the illicium. The entire illicial apparatus consists of the illicial pterygiophore (the "base" of the structure) (which may bear a vestigial second dorsal spine) followed the bone of the illicium which ends with the esca proper. Both the esca and illicium are used in tandem to lure prey. The illicium's length is highly variable across species, from not being visible at all in some species, to around 4.9 times SL (nearly five times the length of the rest of the body) in Gigantactis macronema (body length 354 mm (13.9 in)).

The illicium is actively controlled and not a fixed appendage. Associated muscles move the supporting bones and allow the esca to be positioned, extended, retraced, or waved in front of the mouth. The form and movement of the lure are different among anglerfish groups:\ in the deep-sea anglerfish (Ceratioidei) the esca contain bioluminescent bacteria, making them glow against the darkness of the deeper pelagic zones. In other species the esca possesses different luring mechanisms, such as emitting odoriferous chemicals that attract olfactory-driven prey (batfish, Ogcocephaloidei; possibly sea toads, Chaunacioidei), or by resembling prey attractive to small fish such as shrimp or worms (frogfish, Antennarioidei). When the prey is close enough, the anglerfish catches it using suction feeding, elongated sharp teeth, or both. While sometimes reported to possess a bioluminescent esca, sea toads lack bioluminescent bacteria and do not actually possess this feature.

In many species the illicial apparatus can be retracted; in the various species this appendage may slot into a groove, trough, or cavity, which accommodates part or all of the illicial apparatus. In contrast, lophioid monkfish and antennarioid frogfish and handfish have "fixed" lures which are relatively immobile.

In pelagic anglerfish such as the triplewart seadevil, the illicium is moved back and forth by five distinct pairs of muscles, two intrinsic pairs and three extrinsic: the shorter erector and depressor muscles that dictate movement of the illicial bone, along with inclinator, protractor, and retractor muscles that aid motion of the pterygiophore.

== Behavior ==
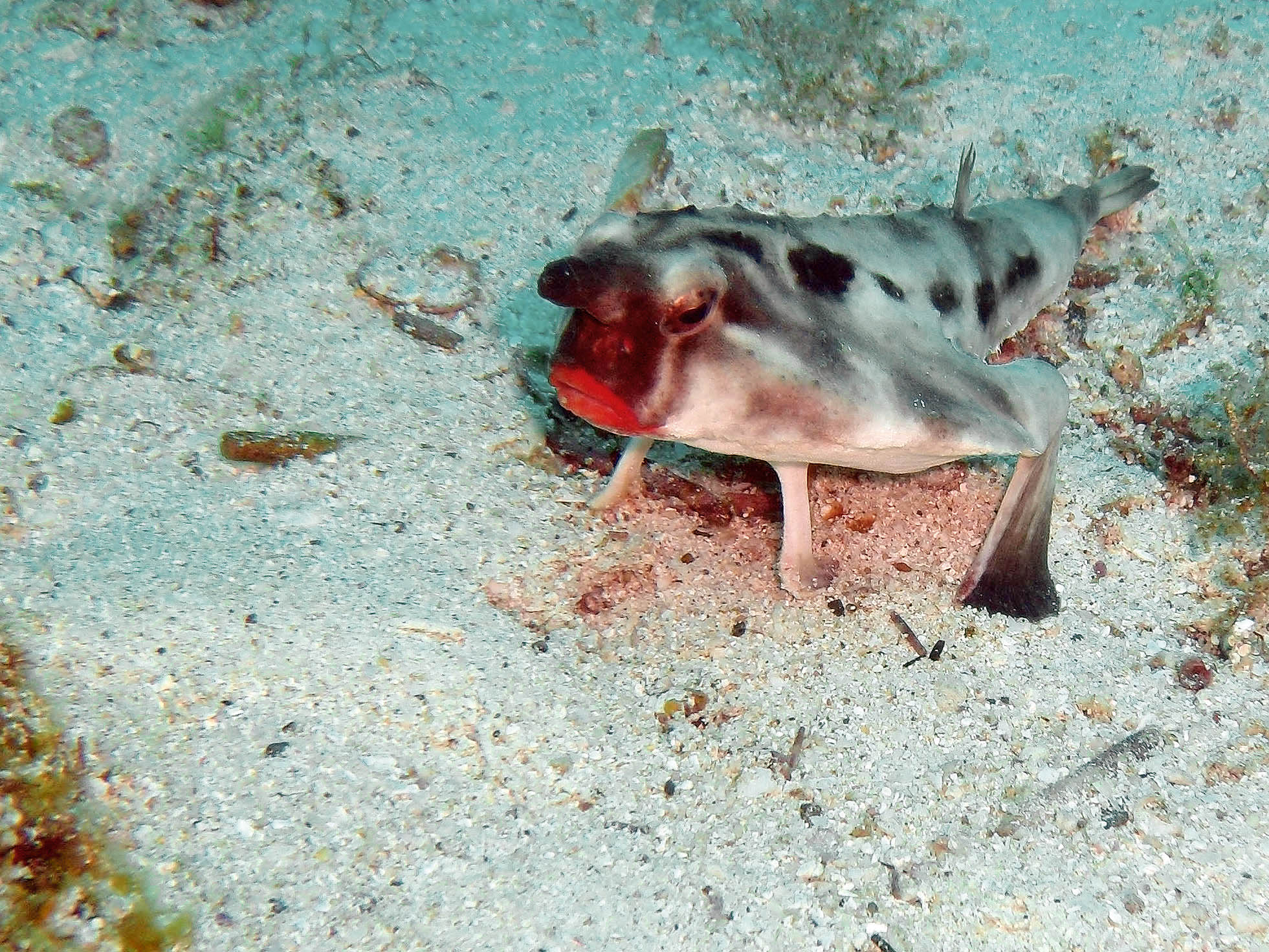
Red-lipped batfish "standing" on the benthos

All anglerfish are weak swimmers, including the pelagic deep-sea anglerfish. Demersal species often "walk" on the bottom upon their pectoral and pelvic fins. The pelvic fins were lost in the deep-sea anglers.

The deep-sea anglers often drift without actively swimming; In situ observation of female Oneirodes and whipnose anglerfish (from ROVs) recorded that they often passively float in place or in a current, but they were sometimes observed to attempt to flee from the ROV, beating its pectoral fins in-phase while undulating its tail fin. The lethargic behavior of these ambush predators is suited to the energy-poor environment of the deep sea.

The sea toad Chaunax endeavouri has been observed to retain water in its gills for at least around 26 seconds and up to 4 minutes in some cases. This behavior is thought to be an energy-saving measure as respiration requires energy, thus the fish "holding its breath" may conserve enough energy for such a behavior to be beneficial.

=== Predation ===
Anglerfish can wiggle the esca to make it resemble a prey animal, which lures the anglerfish's prey close enough for the anglerfish to devour them whole. Some deep-sea anglerfish of the bathypelagic zone also emit light from their esca to attract prey. In bottom-dwelling species, predation often occurs as luring leading to surprise attacks. Frogfishes resemble sponges, rock, algae, or other benthic organisms and lurk until prep approaches, while batfishes and monkfishes wait on or near the seabed. When prey is within range, the fish opens its large mouth rapidly and pulls it in by suction.

The jaw and stomach of the anglerfish can extend to allow it to consume prey up to twice its size. Because of the limited amount of food available in the anglerfish's environment, this adaptation allows the anglerfish to store food when there is an abundance.

Because anglerfish are opportunistic foragers, they show a range of preferred prey with fish at the extremes of the size spectrum, whilst showing increased selectivity for certain prey. One study examining the stomach contents of threadfin anglerfish (Lophiodes spilurus) off the Pacific coast of Central America found these fish primarily ate two categories of benthic prey: crustaceans and teleost fish. The most frequent prey were pandalid shrimp. 52% of the stomachs examined were empty, supporting the observations that anglerfish are low energy consumers.

=== Reproduction ===
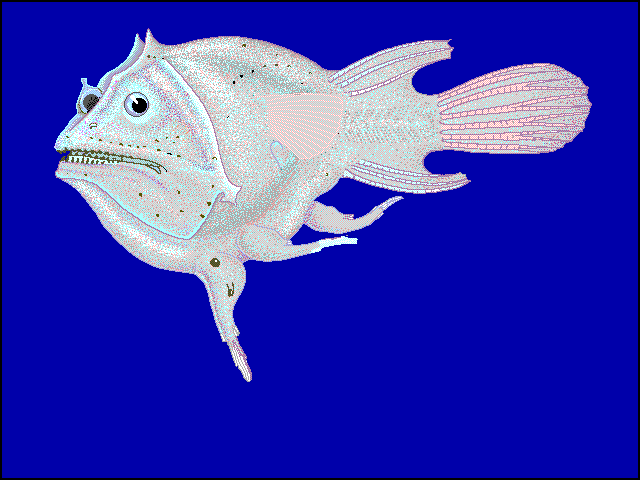
Linophrynidae: Haplophryne mollis female anglerfish with males attached

The deep-sea anglerfish employ an unusual mating method: because individuals are locally rare, encounters between two of the same species are also very rare, and finding a mate can be problematic; this has led to the development of sexual parasitism in anglerfish, where the males latch onto their mates using their mouths, which may not be suitable or effective for prey capture. When scientists first started capturing ceratioid anglerfish, they noticed that all of the specimens were female, and on some of these they had what appeared to be parasites attached to them, which turned out to be highly dimorphic male ceratioids. This is one of the few instances of naturally occurring parabiosis. In some species of anglerfish, fusion between male and female when reproducing is possible due to the lack of immune system keys that allow antibodies to mature and create receptors for T-cells.

Among the better documented non-parasitic reproductive strategies are the gelatinous egg masses produced by monkfishes and related bottom-dwelling anglerfishes.

The spawn of all anglerfish are enveloped by a gelatinous sheath, which has multiple terms referring to it. The spawn of the Lophius anglerfish consists of a thin sheet of transparent gelatinous material 25 cm (10 in) wide and may be longer than 10 m (33 ft); this "egg mass" may contain over a million eggs. The eggs in this sheet are in a single layer, each in its own cavity. The larvae are pelagic and have the pelvic fins elongated into filaments. It is thought that these egg masses effectively disperse their young over great distances and a large area. A 77 millimetres (3.0 in) female Linophryne arborifera, with a 15 millimetres (0.59 in) parasitic male, was observed to have numerous eggs embedded in a gelatinous mass (the "egg raft" or "veil") protruding from the genital opening; the eggs, 0.6–0.8mm in diameter, are among the largest known for any ceratioid. The egg rafts/veils of batfish and frogfish are comparable, though the rafts of Ogcocephalus cubifrons did not have a defined shape, compared to the "scrolled" rafts of Histrio histrio, or ballon-shaped rafts of Antennarius nummifer; additionally, the eggs themselves are larger in size.

== Relation to humans ==
=== Classical interpretation ===
In the History of Animals, Aristotle described the "Fishing-Frog" (one of the local Lophius species, like L. piscatorius or L. budegassa) as an example of a marine species well adapted to their environment, those equipped with "ingenious devices" that it uses to capture prey, alongside the Torpedo. He noted that fishing-frogs that have lost their lure appeared to be thinner than those still intact.

=== As food ===
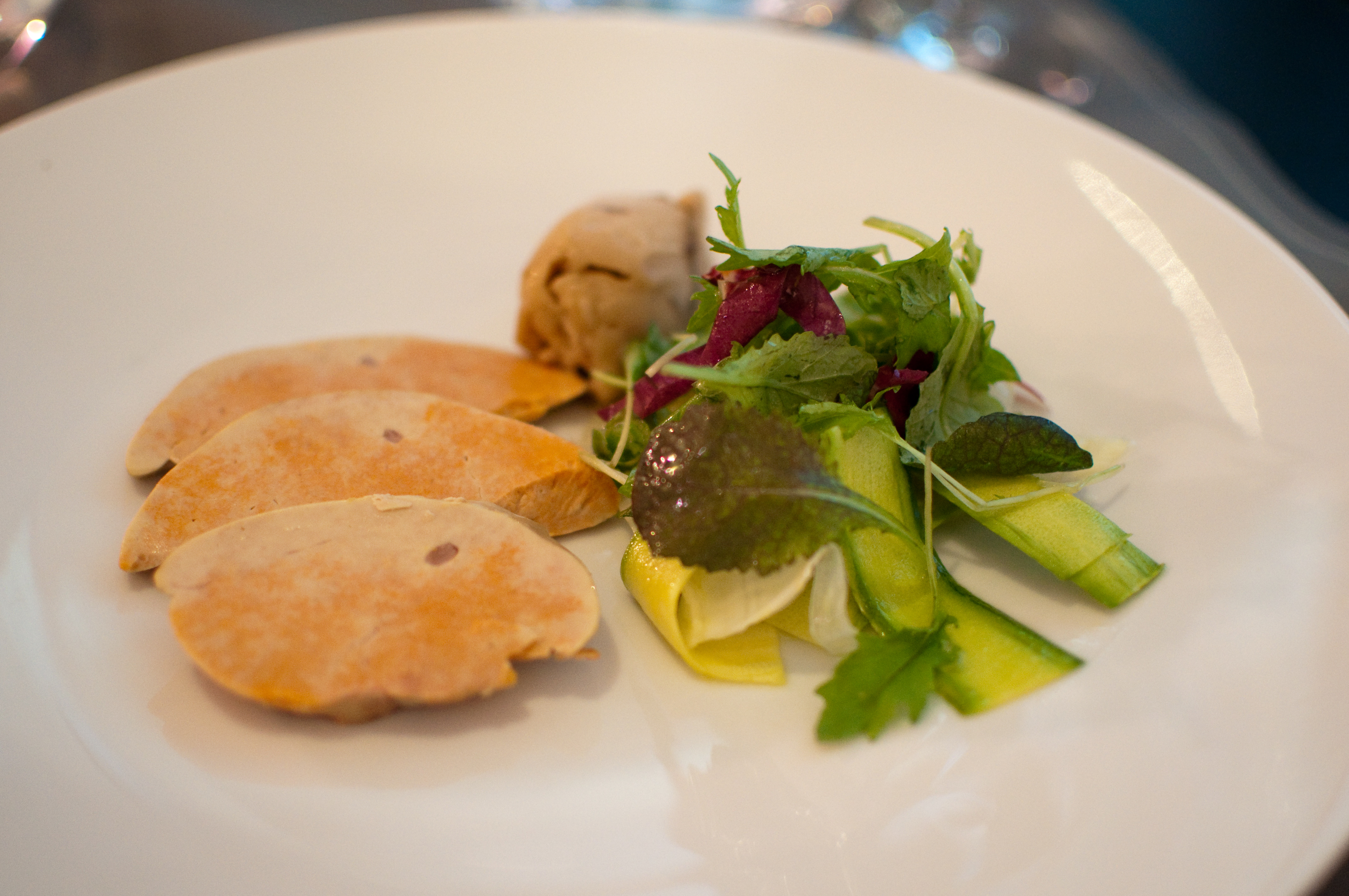
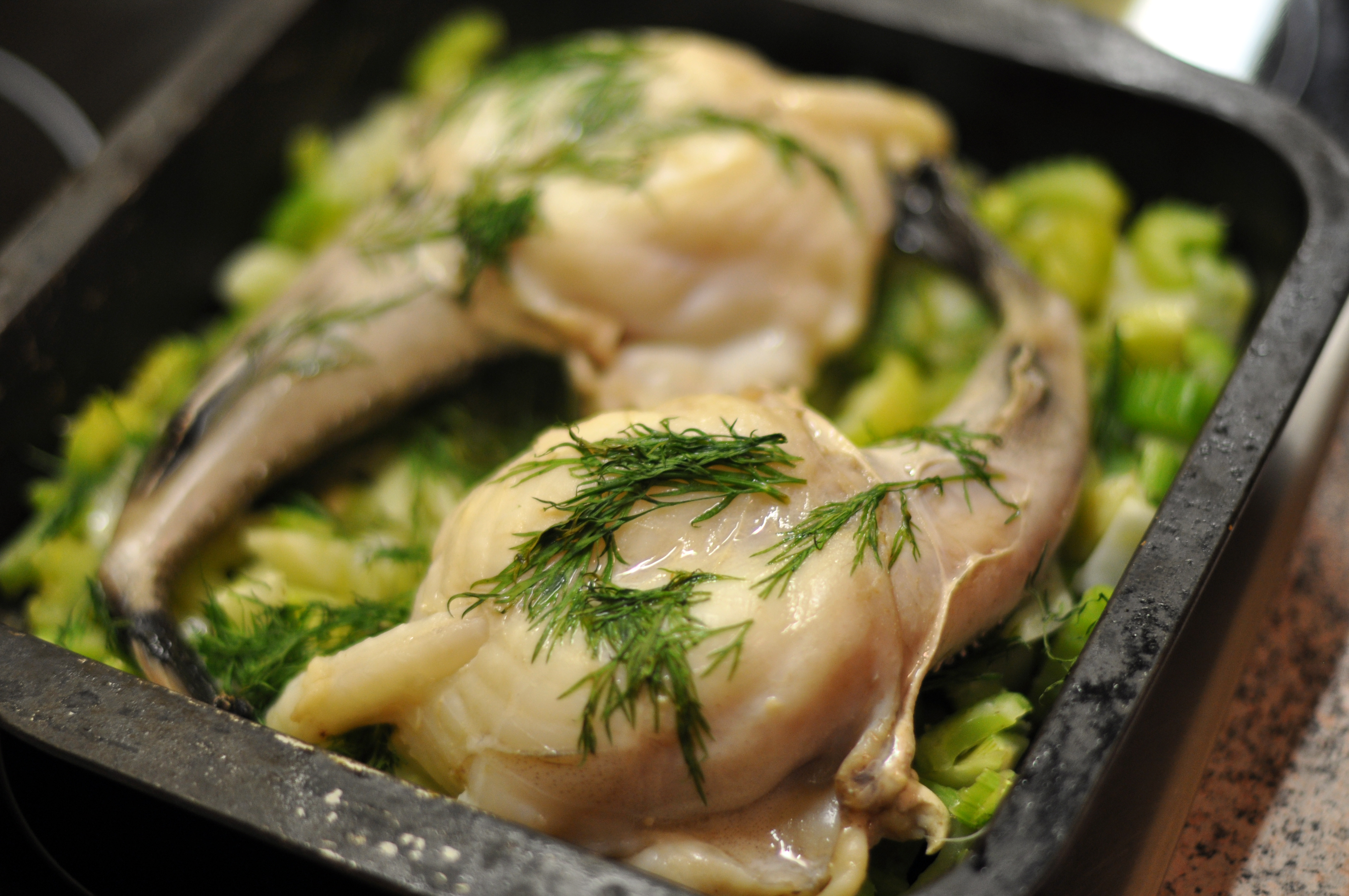
Lophiid dishes from Japan (ankimo) and Denmark

Lophiidae, marketed as monkfish or goosefish, are of commercial interest with fisheries found in western Europe, eastern North America, Africa, and East Asia. In Europe and North America, the tail meat of fish of the genus Lophius, known as monkfish or goosefish (North America), is widely used in cooking, and is often compared to lobster tail in taste and texture.

In Africa, the countries of Namibia and the Republic of South Africa record the highest catches. In Asia, especially Japan, monkfish liver, known as ankimo, is considered a delicacy. Anglerfish is especially heavily consumed in South Korea, where it is featured as the main ingredient in dishes such as Agujjim.

Northwest European Lophius species are heavily fished and are listed by the ICES as "outside safe biological limits". In 2010, Greenpeace International added the American angler (Lophius americanus), the angler (Lophius piscatorius), and the black-bellied angler (Lophius budegassa) to its seafood red list—a list of fish commonly sold worldwide with a high likelihood of being sourced from unsustainable fisheries. Additionally, anglerfish are known to occasionally rise to the surface during El Niño, leaving large groups of dead anglerfish floating on the surface.

=== Captivity ===
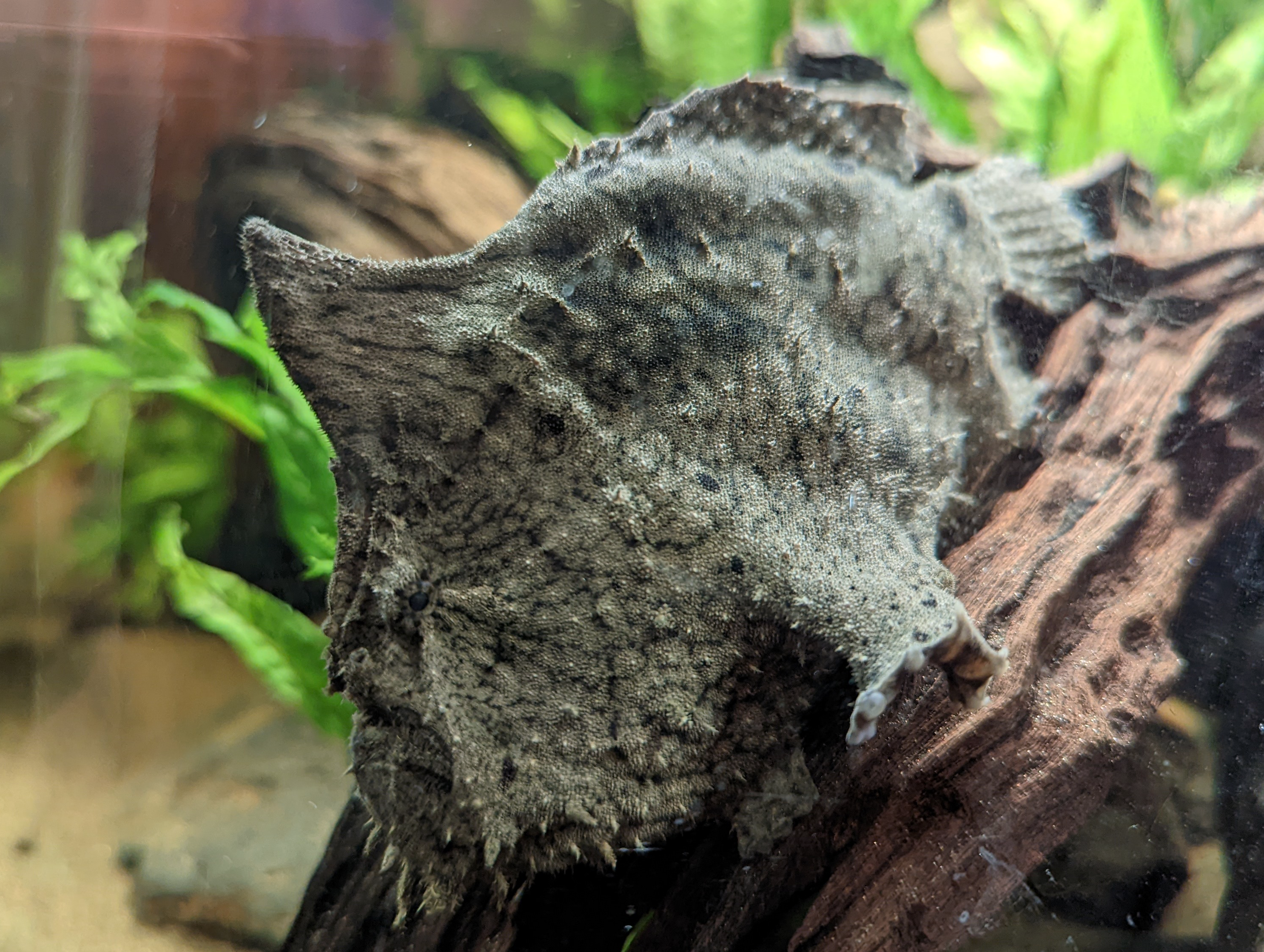
A. biocellatus in aquascape

Various species of anglerfish are kept in captivity, such as frogfish and batfish, though these are all species that inhabit shallow waters; deep-sea anglerfish have not been kept in captivity due to the challenges of keeping them alive through capture, transport, and a display that can repressurize them.

Antennarius biocellatus is known by the common names brackish-water frogfish or freshwater frogfish; being euryhaline, it can live in freshwater for some time, sometimes claimed to be the sole representative of the anglerfish to live in freshwater. Like many frogfish, it has been displayed in public aquaria, though unlike the other species A. biocellatus are sometimes kept in home aquaria by private aquarists.
