= Soybean sprout =

Culinary vegetable

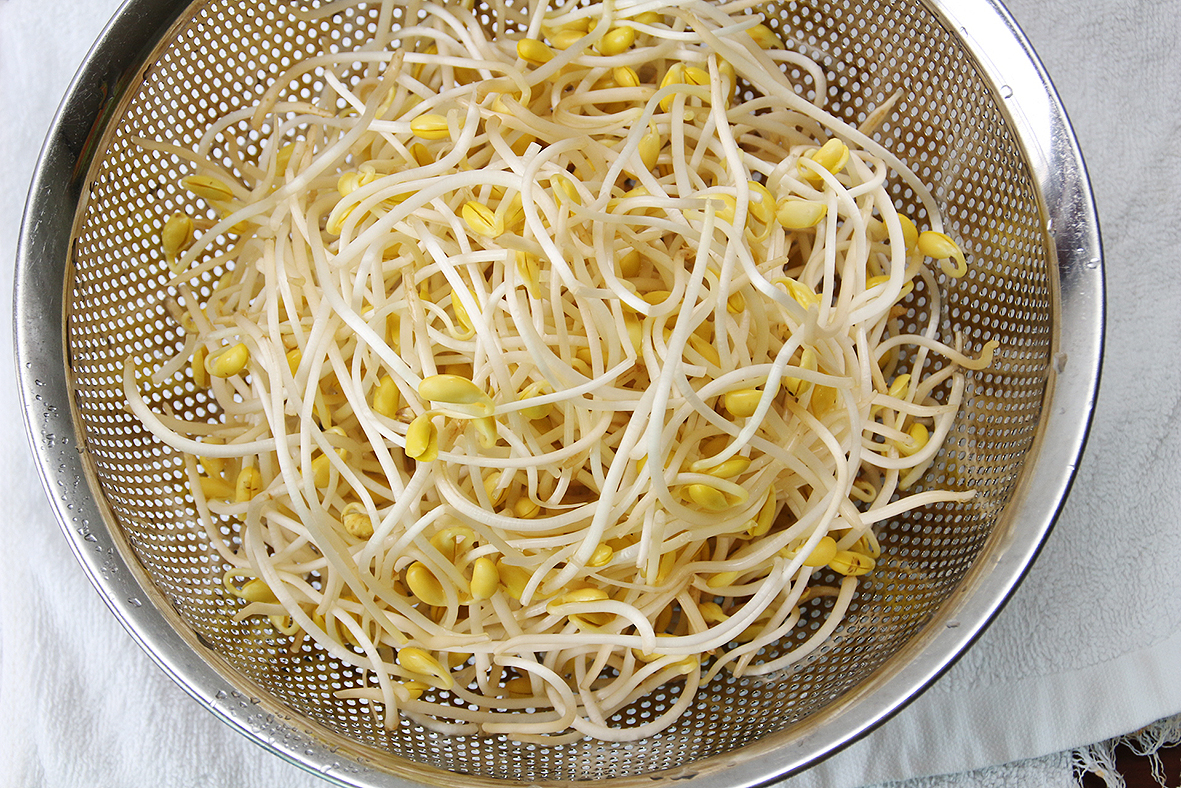

Chinese name
- Traditional Chinese: 黃豆芽，黃芽白，大荳芽菜
- Simplified Chinese: 黄豆芽
- Literal meaning: yellow bean sprout
Transcriptions
Standard Mandarin
- Hanyu Pinyin: huángdòuyá
- Wade–Giles: huang^{2}tou^{4}ya^{2}

Vietnamese name
- Vietnamese: giá đậu nành

Korean name
- Hangul: 콩나물
- Literal meaning: bean namul
Transcriptions
- Revised Romanization: kongnamul
- McCune–Reischauer: k'ongnamul

Japanese name
- Kanji: 豆萌やし
- Kana: まめもやし
Transcriptions
- Revised Hepburn: mamemoyashi

Malay name
- Malay: tauge kasar

Indonesian name
- Indonesian: kecambah kacang kedelai

Soybean sprout is a culinary vegetable grown by sprouting soybeans. It can be grown by placing and watering the sprouted soybeans in the shade until the roots grow long. Soybean sprouts are extensively cultivated and consumed in Asian countries.

== History ==
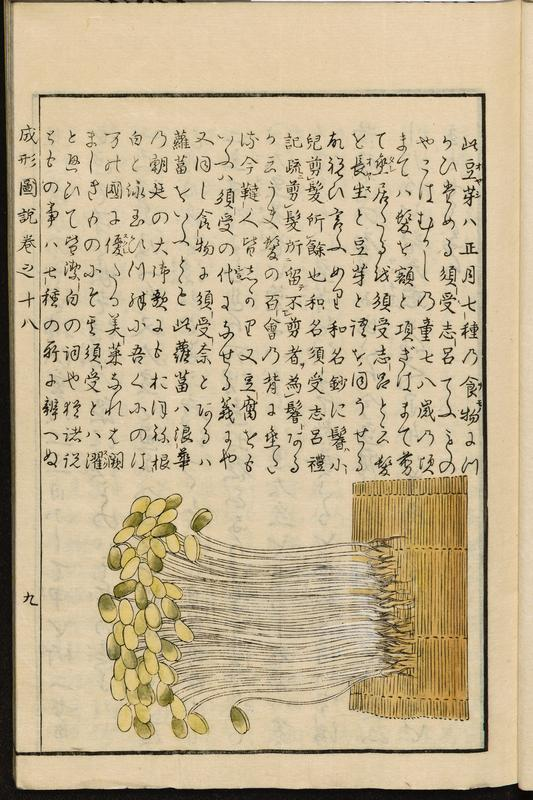
Soybean sprouts, illustration from the Japanese agricultural encyclopedia Seikei Zusetsu (1804)

The earliest surviving textual references to soybean sprouts are found in Chinese sources. The Shennong bencao jing (compiled no later than the Han period) mentions dadou huangjuan (大豆黃卷), a term later medical commentators glossed as “soybean sprouts”. Chinese agricultural literature also records methods for producing bean sprouts; the Nongzheng quanshu states of sprout cultivation that “soybean sprouts are done the same way” (大豆芽同此).

In Korea, soybean sprouts are documented by the early 13th century. The Hyangyak gugeupbang records them under the name daedu-hwang (大豆黃), and later Korean works describe their cultivation and culinary use.

Soybean sprouts later became an important ingredient in several East Asian cuisines.

== Culinary use ==
=== Korea ===
Soybean sprouts are one of the most common and basic ingredients in Korean cuisine. In Korean, the word kongnamul (콩나물) refers to both the soybean sprouts themselves and the namul (seasoned vegetable dish) made from soybean sprouts. The namul dish, made by stir-frying soybean sprouts with sesame oil and simmering it, is a common dish for jesa (ancestral rite). Another common side dish is kongnamul-muchim, made by seasoning boiled soybean sprouts. Soybean sprouts are also used in bibimbap and varieties of jjim dishes, such as agwi-jjim (braised angler). Sometimes, kongnamul-bap (rice cooked with soybean sprouts) eaten with herbed soy sauce constitutes a rustic meal. Clear soup made with soybean sprouts is called kongnamul-guk, which can also be served cold in summer. Kongnamul-gukbap or kongnamul-haejangguk (soybean sprout hangover soup) is usually served in a ttukbaegi (earthenware pot) with the rice in the bottom and the soup poured over the top. In contemporary South Korea, a spicy pork bulgogi dish made with a large number of soybean sprouts, called kongnamul-bulgogi (or kongbul), is popular among young people.

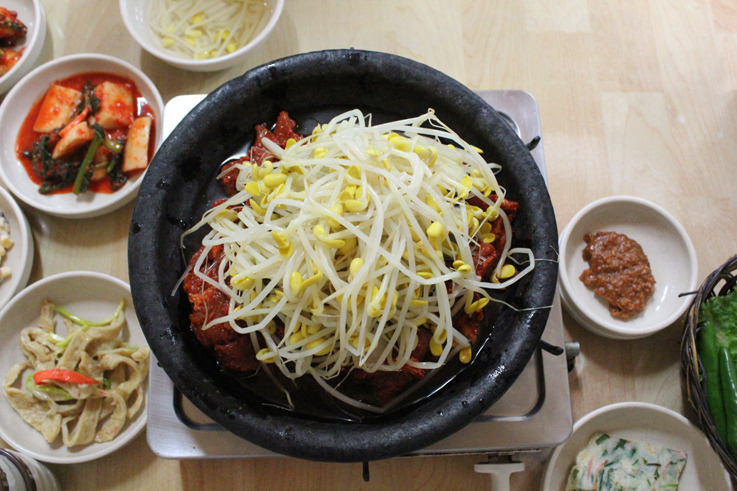
Kongnamul-bulgogi before cooking, topped with soybean sprouts

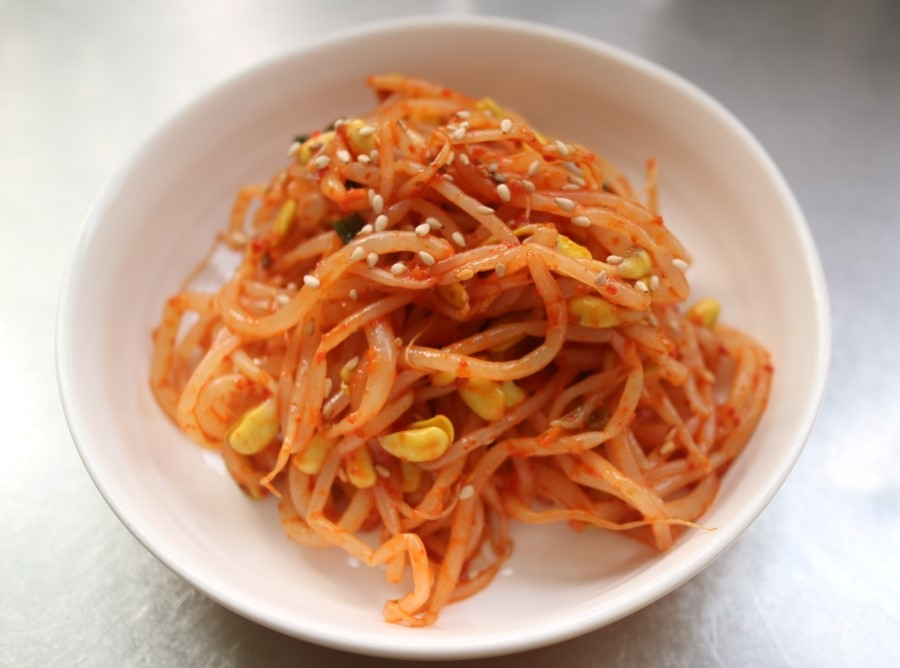
Red kongnamul-muchim (seasoned soybean sprouts)

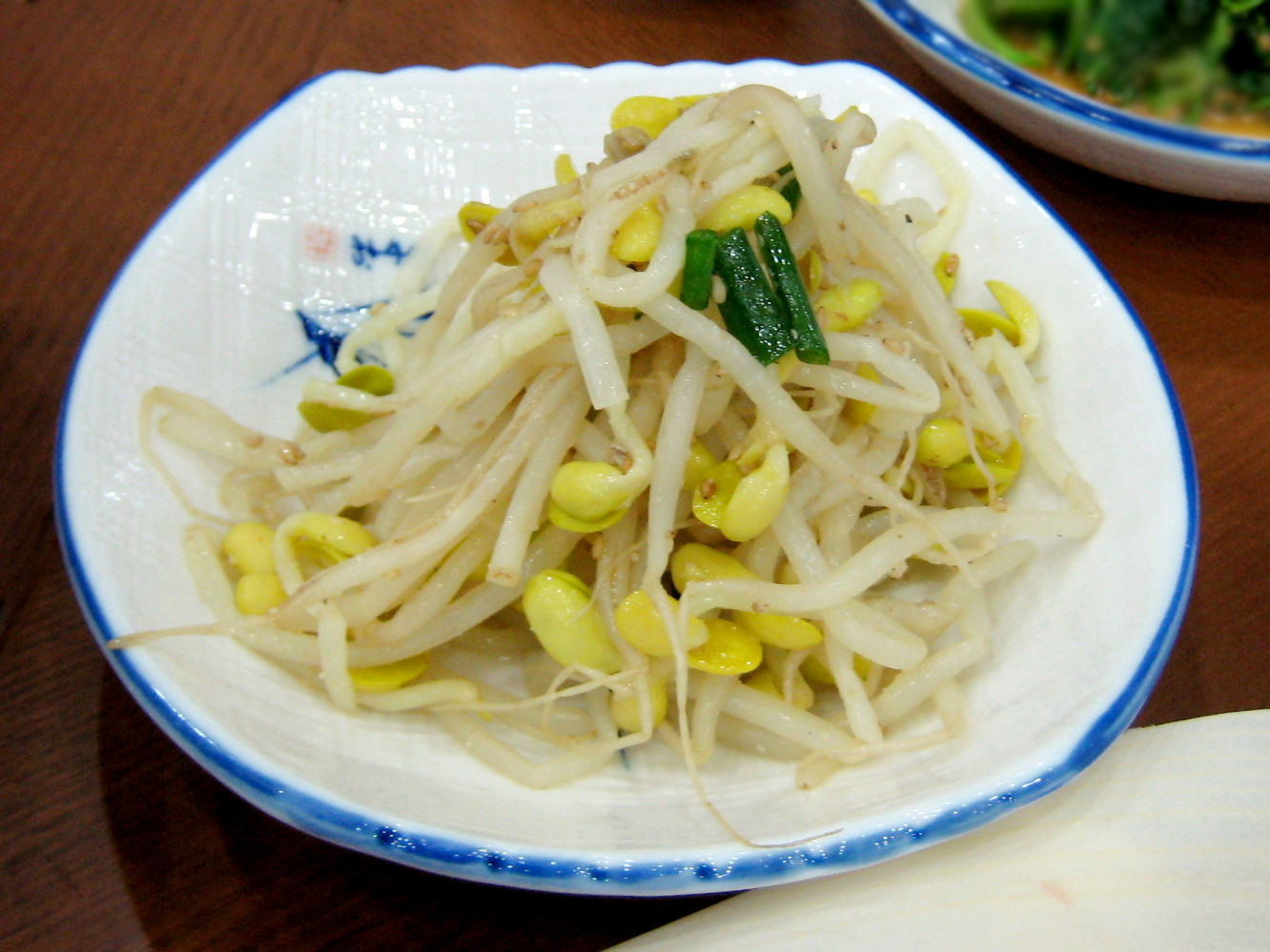
White kongnamul-muchim (seasoned soybean sprouts)

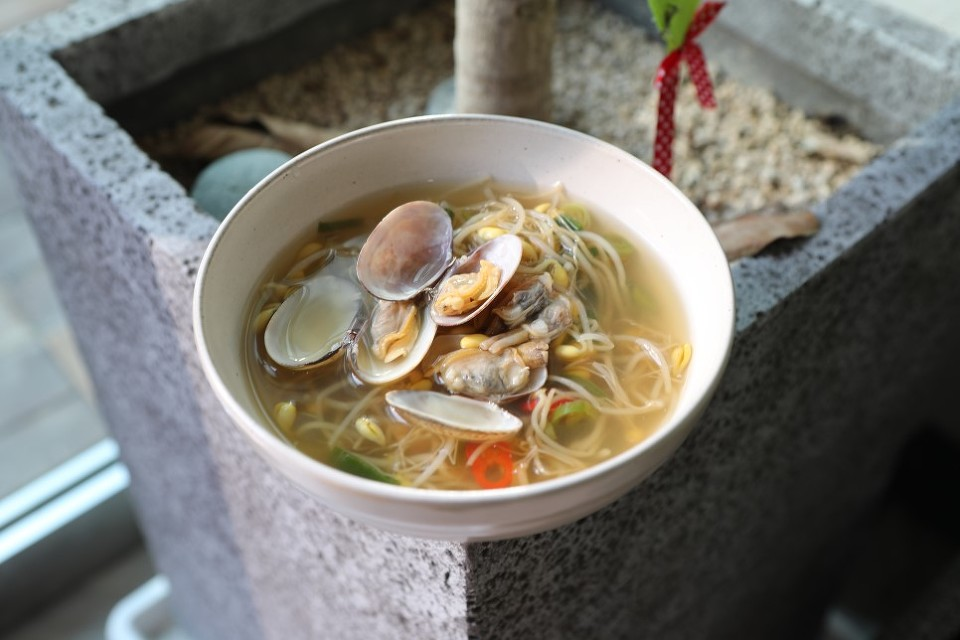
Bajirak-kongnamul-guk (clam and soybean sprout soup)

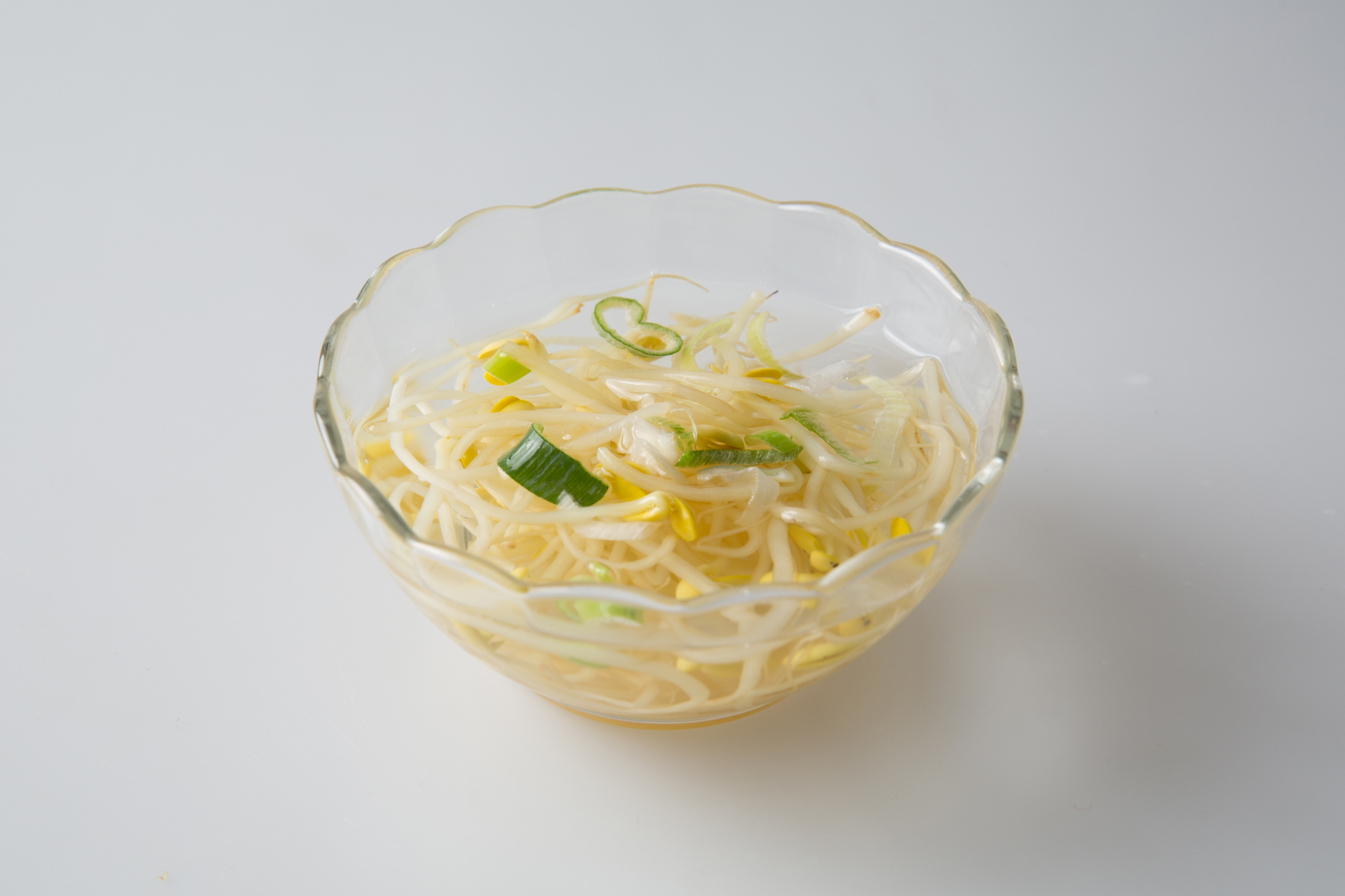
Kongnamul-naengguk (cold soybean sprout soup)

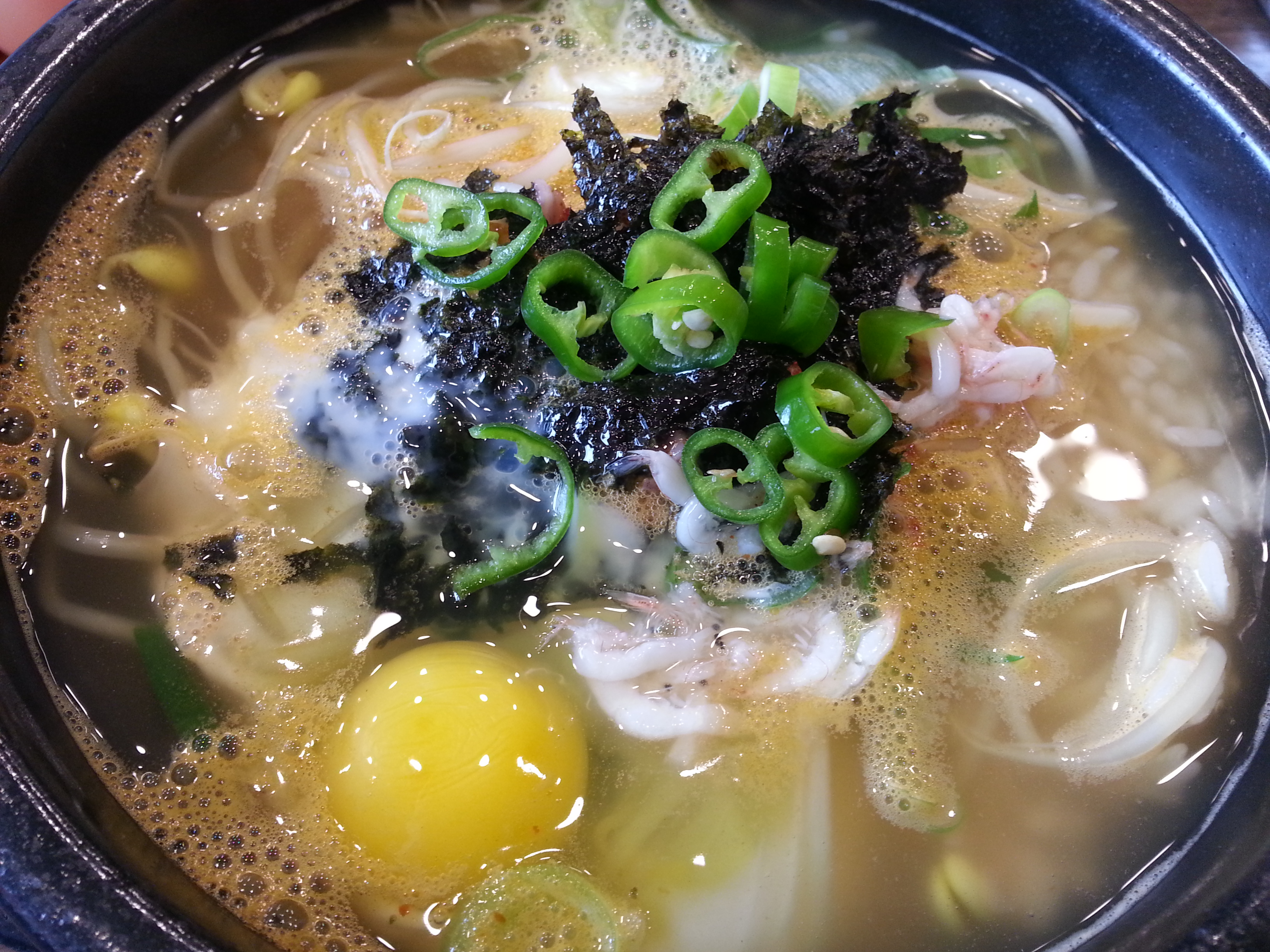
Kongnamul-gukbap (soybean sprout hangover soup with rice)

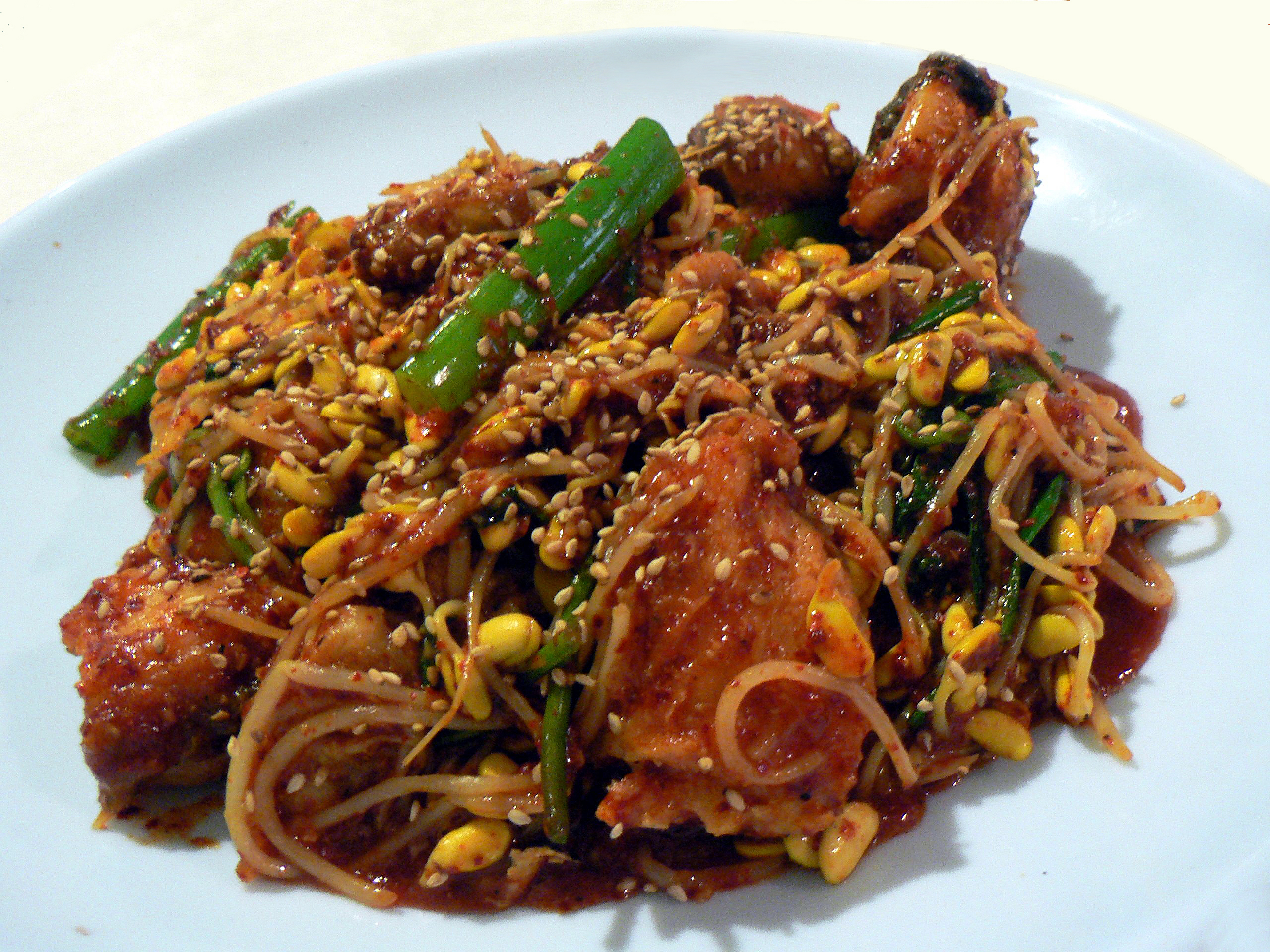
Agwi-jjim made with soybean sprouts

=== Nepal ===
In Nepalese cuisine, kwati, a soup of nine types of sprouted beans, is specially prepared in the festival of Janai Purnima which normally falls in August. Kwati is prepared by frying and mixing onion, garlic, ginger, potatoes, spices and bean sprouts, including soybean sprouts. Much variation exists from house to house. The kwati is normally eaten with rice. Sometimes meat (especially fried goat meat) is added to spice up the kwati.

== See also ==
- Bean sprout
- Mung bean sprout
