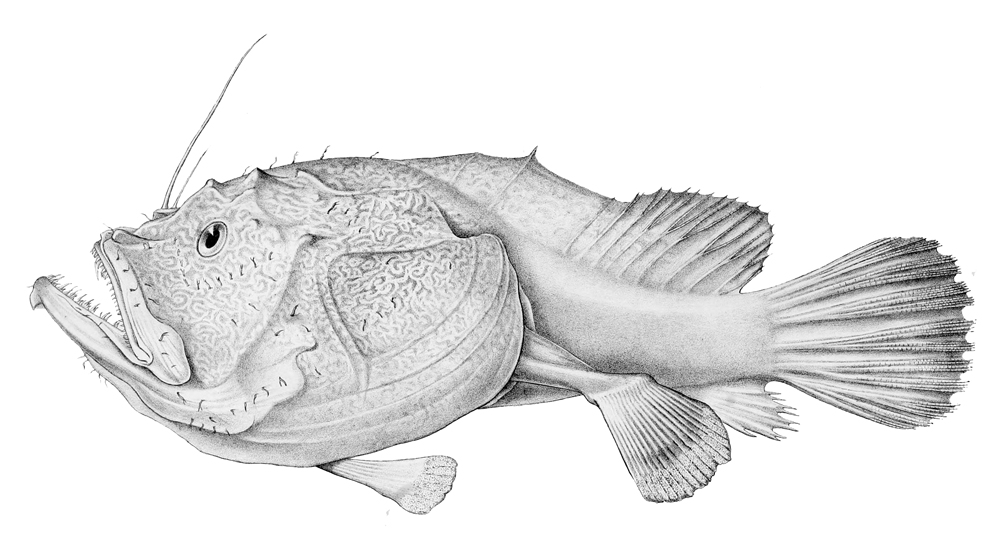

Conservation status
- Data Deficient (IUCN 3.1)

Scientific classification
- Kingdom: Animalia
- Phylum: Chordata
- Class: Actinopterygii
- Order: Lophiiformes
- Family: Lophiidae
- Genus: Sladenia
- Species: S. gardineri

Binomial name
- Sladenia gardineri Regan, 1908

= Sladenia gardineri =

Species of fish

Sladenia gardineri, the Indian round angler, is a species of marine ray-finned fish belonging to the family Lophiidae, the goose fishes, monkfishes or anglers. This species is found in the Indo-Pacific.

== Taxonomy ==
Sladenia gardineri was first formally described in 1908 by the English ichthyologist Charles Tate Regan with its type locality given as Salomon Atoll in the Chagos Archipelago of the Indian Ocean. When Regan described this species he classified it in a new genus Sladenia of which it was the only species, meaning that this species is the type species of Sladenia by monotypy. The genus Sladenia is one of 4 extant genera in the family Lophiidae which the 5th edition of Fishes of the World classifies in the monotypic suborder Lophioidei within the order Lophiiformes.

== Etymology ==
Sladenia gardineri has the genus name Sladenia which honours Percy Sladen, the British echinoderm biologist. The holotype of S. gardineri was collected during an expedition funded by his memorial trust. The specific name gardineri honours John Stanley Gardiner, the British zoologist who collected the holotype.

== Description ==
Sladenia gardineri was described by Regan as having the no third dorsal spine, which Regan called an occipital ray, on the head with this third spine being present in the other Lophiid genera. The head is large, its length being half the length of the fish. There are 9 soft rays in the dorsal fin and 6 in the anal fin. The colour is dark grey marked with pale sinuous lines, the outer half of the pectoral fin is pale. The length of the holotype was 50 cm (20 in).

== Distribution ==
Sladenia gardineri is found in the Chagos Archipelago in the central Indian Ocean and has been recorded in the western Pacific Ocean off New South Wales, although these specimens may represent an undescribed species or S. remiger. The holotype was collected at a depth of 823 m (2,700 ft) "450 fathoms".
