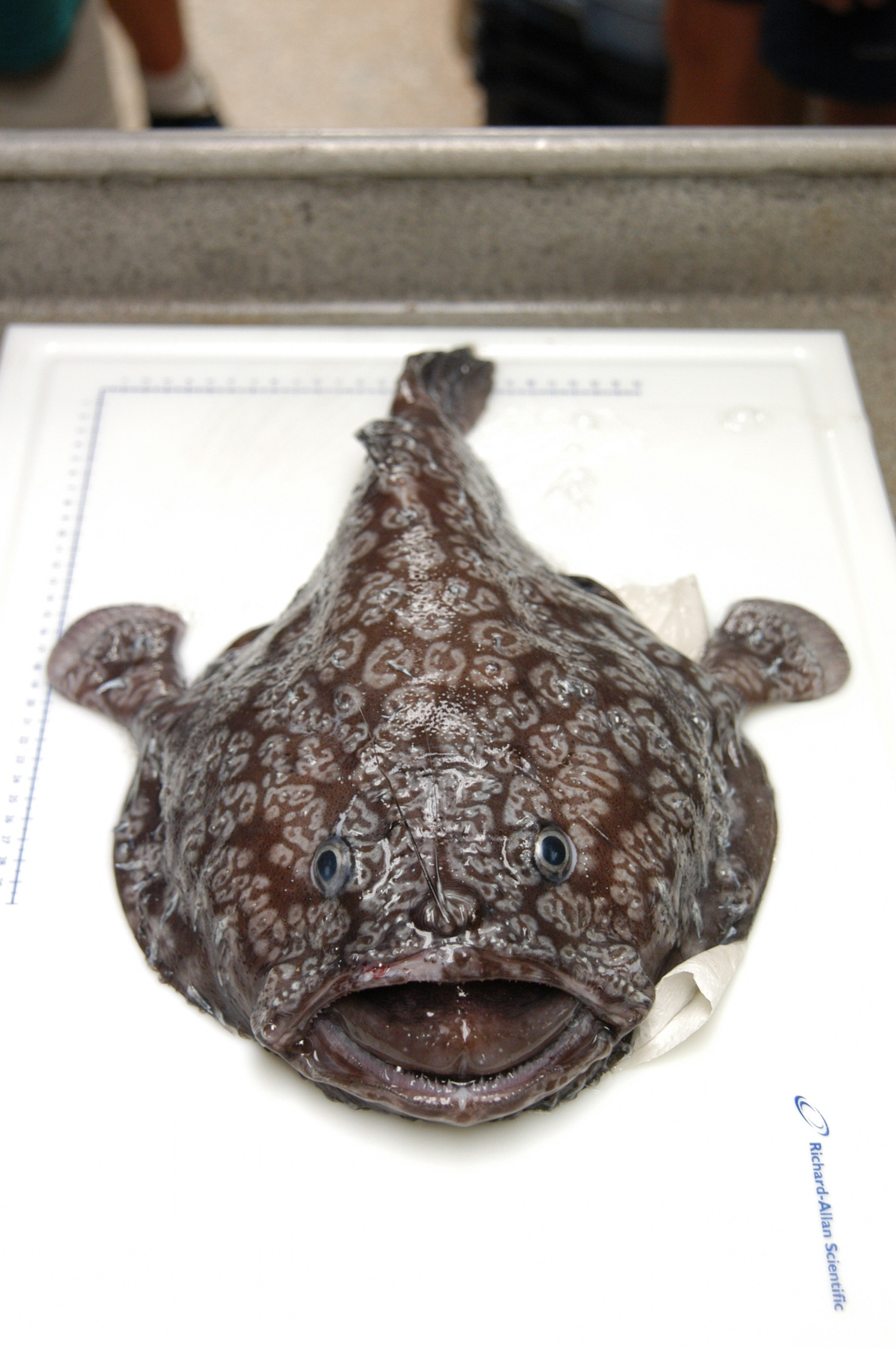
- Schaefer's Anglerfish from Estuary to Abyss Expedition 2004
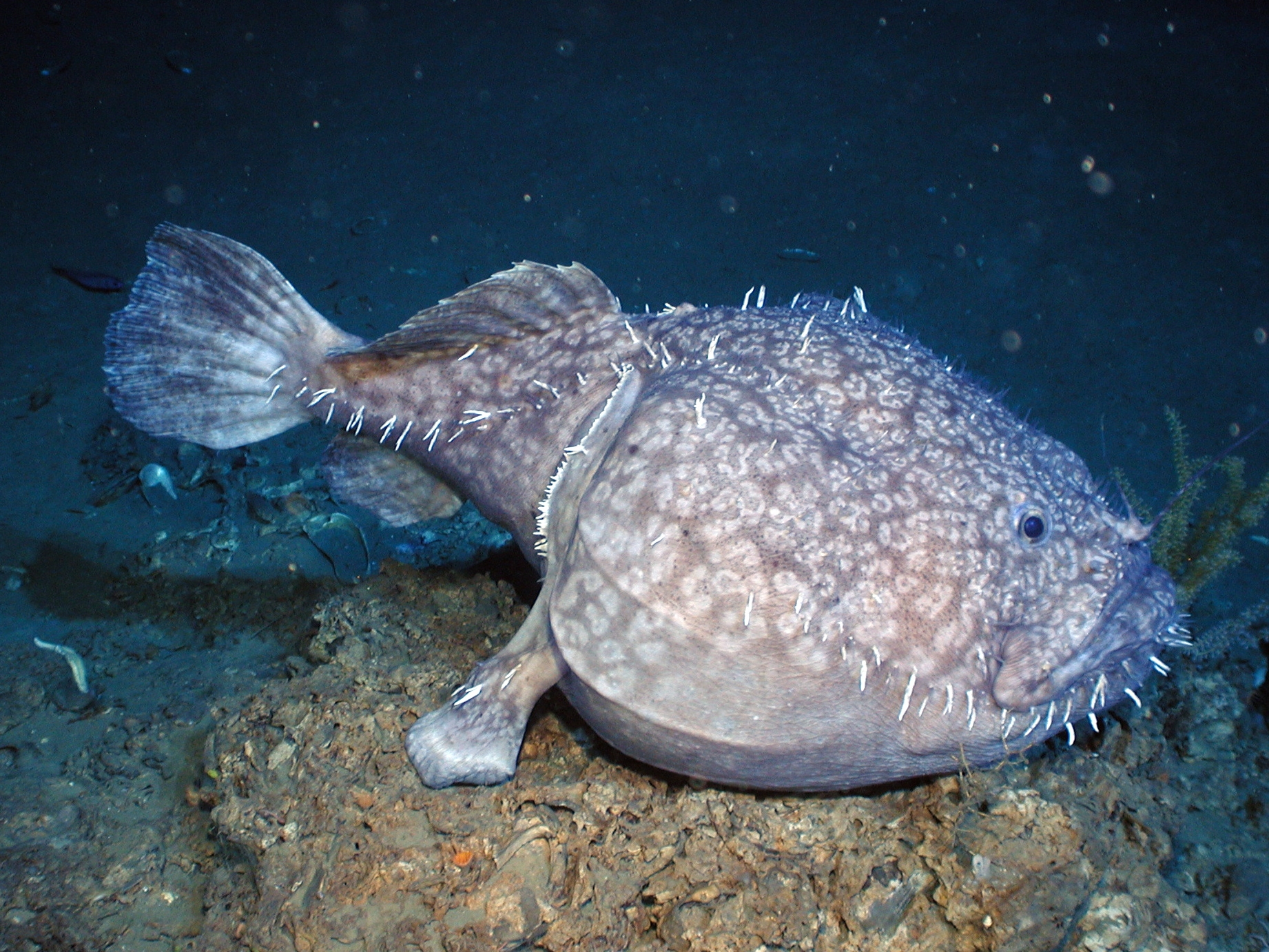
- Shaefer's Anglerfish during Operation Deep Slope 2007

Conservation status
- Least Concern (IUCN 3.1)

Scientific classification
- Kingdom: Animalia
- Phylum: Chordata
- Class: Actinopterygii
- Order: Lophiiformes
- Family: Lophiidae
- Genus: Sladenia
- Species: S. shaefersi

Binomial name
- Sladenia shaefersi J. H. Caruso & Bullis, 1976

= Sladenia shaefersi =

Species of fish

Sladenia shaefersi, the Atlantic twospine goosefish or Shaefer's anglerfish, is a species of marine ray-finned fish belonging to the family Lophiidae, the goosefishes, monkfishes and anglers. This species is found in the western Atlantic Ocean.

== Taxonomy ==
Sladenia shaefersi was first formally described in 1976 by the American ichthyologists John H. Caruso and Harvey R. Bullis with its type locality given as Point Barú on the Caribbean coast of Colombia. The genus Sladenia is one of 4 extant genera in the family Lophiidae which the 5th edition of Fishes of the World classifies in the monotypic suborder Lophioidei within the order Lophiiformes.

== Etymology ==
Sladenia gardineri has the genus name Sladenia which honors Percy Sladen, the British echinoderm biologist. The holotype of S. gardineri was collected during an expedition funded by his memorial trust. The specific name shaefersi honors Edward A. Schaefers, the former chief of the Exploratory Fishing and Gear Research Branch of the now renamed Bureau of Commercial Fisheries.

== Description ==
Sladenia shaefersi has a rounded, rather than depressed head with a obviously convex nape, the rear of the body and caudal peduncle are compressed rather than flattened. There is a smooth bony ridge from the top of the orbit to the snout. The few spines on the head are low and rounded and are just noticeable beneath the skin. The teeth are rather small and bruistle like, with those in the center of the roof of the mouth being larger than those on the sides. The first dorsal fin has 2 spines on the head, the first spine being the illicium with its esca being filamentous. The third spine is behind the head and the second dorsal fin contains 8 or 9 soft rays and the anal fin has 6 soft rays. The head, lower jave, pectoral fins and caudal fin have many rows and patches of small, pointed cirri over them. The overall color is grey with a network of pale lines and pale rosettes. This species reaches a length of 101 cm (40 in)>

== Distribution and habitat ==
Sladenia shaeferis is found in the Western Atlantic as far north as the Corner Rise Seamounts and the Blake Plateau off South Carolina into the Gulf of Mexico and the Caribbean Sea as far south as Colombia and Venezuela. It is a bathydemersal species found at depths between 900 and 1,200 m (3,000 and 3,900 ft), on coral rubble on the continental slope and on seamounts.
