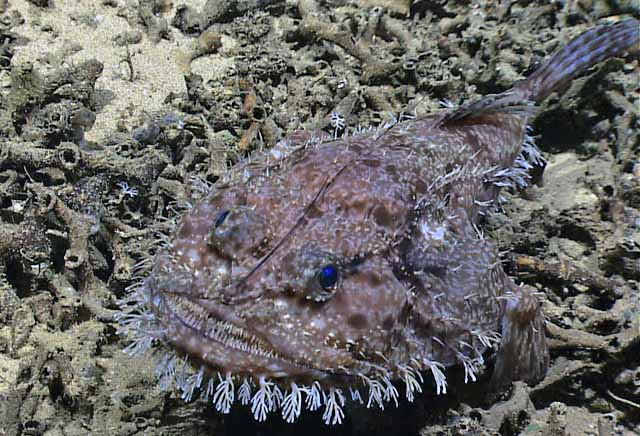

Conservation status
- Least Concern (IUCN 3.1)

Scientific classification
- Kingdom: Animalia
- Phylum: Chordata
- Class: Actinopterygii
- Order: Lophiiformes
- Family: Lophiidae
- Genus: Lophiodes
- Species: L. beroe

Binomial name
- Lophiodes beroe J. H. Caruso, 1981

= Lophiodes beroe =

Species of fish

Lophiodes beroe, the white goosefish or white anglerfish, is a species of marine ray-finned fish belonging to the family Lophiidae, the goosefishes, monkfishes or anglers. This species is found in deep waters in the western Atlantic Ocean.

== Taxonomy ==
Lophius beroe was first formally described in 1981 by the American ichthyologist John H. Caruso with its type locality given as "Western North Atlantic, 24°24'N, 80°00'W, depth 730-860 meters". The genus Lophiodes is one of 4 extant genera in the family Lophiidae which the 5th edition of Fishes of the World classifies in the monotypic suborder Lophioidei with the order Lophiiformes.

== Etymology ==
Lophiodes beroe has the genus name Lophiodes which means "having the form of Lophius, the type genus of the Lophiidae. Lophius means "mane" and is presumably a reference to the first 3 spines of the first dorsal fin which are tentacle-like, with 3 smaller spines behind them. The specific name, beroe, is the name of a sea nymph from Greek mythology, the daughter of Oceanus and Tethys.

== Description ==
Lophiodes beroe has a wide, flattened head and front of the body with a thinner body behind that. The snout is narrow with a pair of smooth ridges which run from the snout to the eyes and the bone behind the eye has a spine, with another spine at the symphysis of the jaws. The wide mouth is armed with numerous long, sharp teeth. The large gill opening is located behind the base of the pectoral fin but extends to its front too. The dorsal fin is divided into two with the first comprising 3 separate spines in the head with a few spines within a membrane above the pectoral fin while the second is supported by 8 soft rays. The first spine on the head is the angling pole, the illicium, has a flap of flesh, the esca, with a cirrus at its tip and more cirri at its base, this is used as a lure to attract prey to within reach of the large mouth. There is a scattering of skin flaps on the head and body. The overall color is uniformly light brown to dark brown or it may be gray or pale brown blotched with dark brown. There are small white dots on the upper body. The first dorsal fin spine is dark, darkest towards the tip but the esca is pale. This species has a maximum published standard length of 40 cm (16 in), although 23 cm (9.1 in) is more typical.

== Distribution and habitat ==
Lophiodes beroe is found in the warner waters of the Western Atlantic Ocean from North Carolina south through the Gulf of Mexico and the Caribbean Sea south along the coast of South America as far as 25°S, off the coast of Brazil. The presence of the white goosefish off the Cuba and the Lesser Antilles may need to be clarified. This species is found at depths between 347 and 860 m (1,138 and 2,822 ft), typically in deep coral reefs and the rubble of Lophelia pertusa. The deep habitat of this species is probably why it was not identified until 1981.
