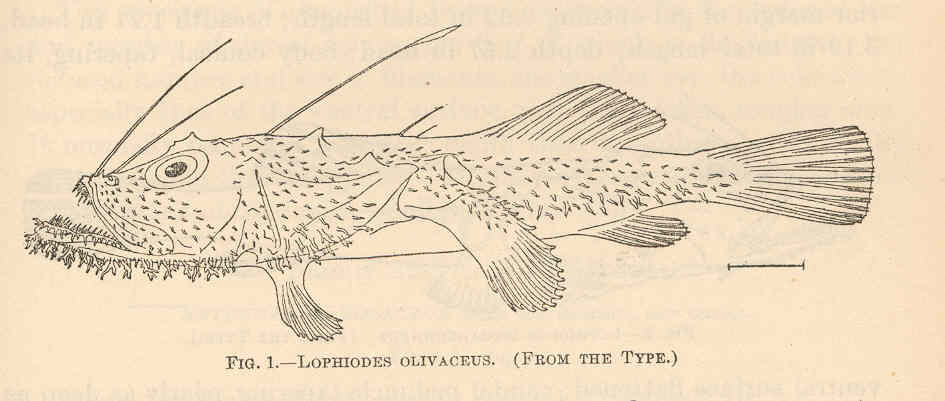

Conservation status
- Least Concern (IUCN 3.1)

Scientific classification
- Kingdom: Animalia
- Phylum: Chordata
- Class: Actinopterygii
- Order: Lophiiformes
- Family: Lophiidae
- Genus: Lophiodes
- Species: L. mutilus

Binomial name
- Lophiodes mutilus (Alcock, 1894)

Synonyms
- Lophius mutilus Alcock, 1894; Chirolophius mutilus (Alcock, 1894); Lophius quinqueradiatus Brauer, 1906; Lophiodes olivaceus Smith & Radcliffe, 1912; Lophius papillosus Weber, 1913; Chirolophius japanicus Kamohara, 1938

= Lophiodes mutilus =

Species of fish

Lophiodes mutilus, the smooth angler or smooth monkfish, is a species of marine ray-finned fish belonging to the family Lophiidae, the goosefishes, monkfishes and anglers. This species is found in the Indo-Pacific.

== Taxonomy ==
Lophiodes mutilus was first formally described as Lophius mutilus in 1894 by the English physician, naturalist, and carcinologist Alfred William Alcock with its type locality given as the Bay of Bengal in eastern India. In 1896 George Brown Goode and Tarleton Hoffman Bean reclassified Lophius mutilis in the new monospecific genus Lophiodes, meaning that this species is the type species of that genus by monotypy. The genus Lophiodes is one of 4 extant genera in the family Lophiidae which the 5th edition of Fishes of the World classifies in the monotypic suborder Lophioidei with the order Lophiiformes.

== Etymology ==
Lophiodes mutilus has the genus name Lophiodes which means "having the form of Lophius, the type genus of the Lophiidae. Lophius means "mane" and is presumably a reference to the first 3spines of the first dorsal fin which are tentacle like, with 3 smaller spines behind them. The specific name, mutilus, means "maimed", "cut off" or "cut short", was not explained by Alcock but may refer to the second spint [[dorsal fin[]] being "rudimentary".

== Description ==
Lophiodes mutilus has 3 separate dorsal spines on the back of the head, then 2 spines in a rudimentary fin behind the head, The soft-rayed dorsal fin has 8 rays while the anal fin has 6 soft rays. The colour is variable, typically pale on the underside and the upper side may be pale through to dark brown or grey. The pectoral fins are darker towards their tips but with pale tips to the fin rays. The skin flaps on the head and body, and on the 3rd spine of the dorsal fin, are dark brown. The ilicium is the same colour as the body with the esca being darker. This species has a maximum published total length of 45 cm (18 in), although 30 cm (12 in) is more typical.

== Distribution and habitat ==
Lophiodes mutilus has a wide Indo-Pacific distribution from the eastern coast of Africa from the Gulf of Aden to KwaZulu-Natal east through the Indian Ocean and into the Western Pacific Ocean north to Japan east as far as Wallis and Futuna and south to Australia. In Australia it occurs from Shark Bay north and east as far as Cape Everard in Victoria. It is a bathydemersal fish found at depths between 234 and 760 m (768 and 2,493 ft) on the continental shelf and upper slope.
