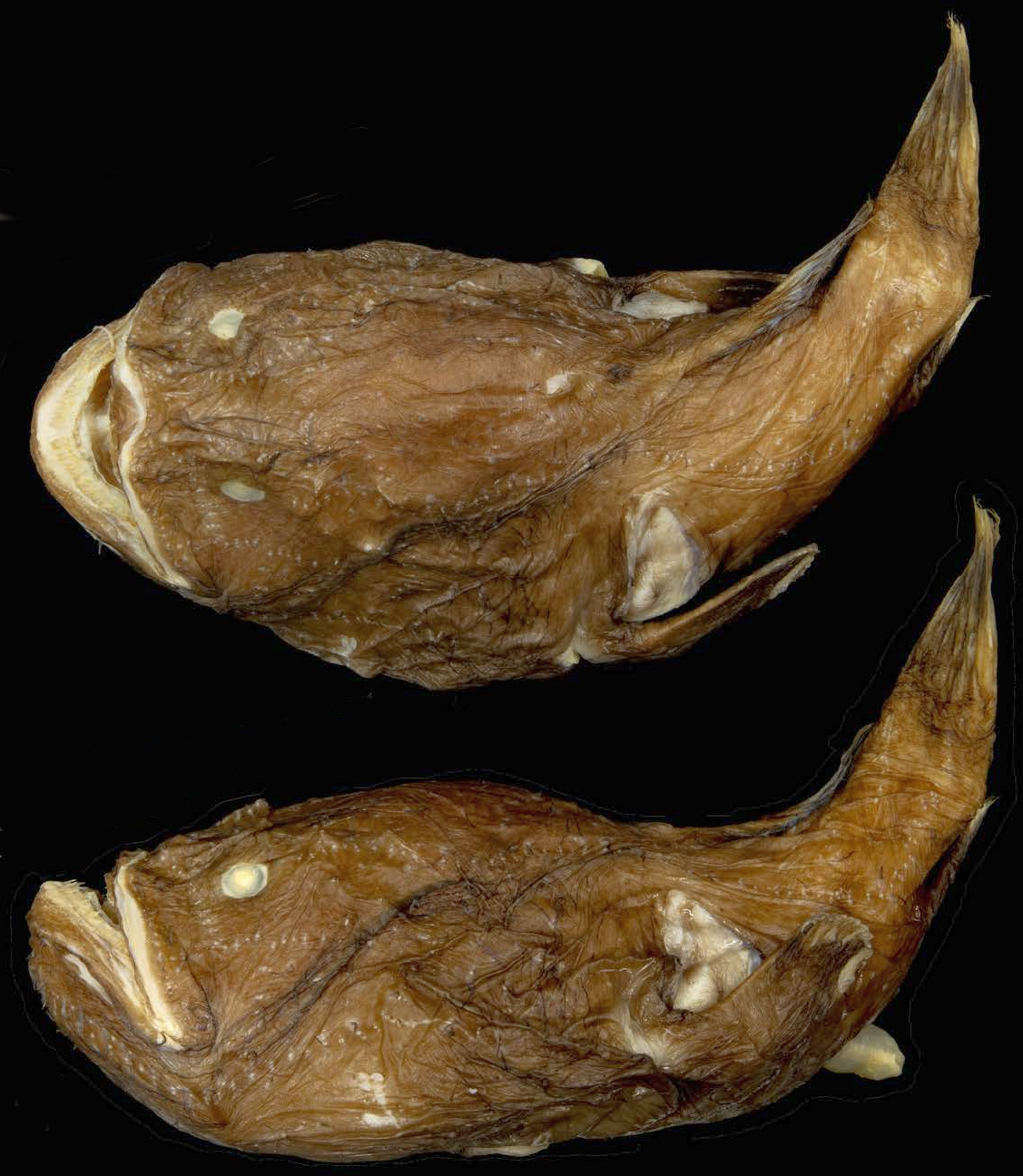

Conservation status
- Data Deficient (IUCN 3.1)

Scientific classification
- Kingdom: Animalia
- Phylum: Chordata
- Class: Actinopterygii
- Order: Lophiiformes
- Family: Lophiidae
- Genus: Sladenia
- Species: S. zhui

Binomial name
- Sladenia zhui Y. Ni, H. L. Wu & S. Li, 2012

= Sladenia zhui =

Species of fish

Sladenia zhui, Chu's rounded angler, is a species of marine ray-finned fish belonging to the family Lophiidae, the goosefishes, monkfishes and anglers. This species is found in the western Pacific Ocean.

== Taxonomy ==
Sladenia zhui was first formally described in 1976 by the Chinese ichthyologists Ni Yong, Wu Han-Lin and Li Sheng with its type locality given as Western North Pacific Ocean. The genus Sladenia is one of 4 extant genera in the family Lophiidae which the 5th edition of Fishes of the World classifies in the monotypic suborder Lophioidei within the order Lophiiformes.

== Etymology ==
Sladenia gardineri has the genus name Sladenia which honours Percy Sladen, the British echinoderm biologist. The holotype of S. gardineri was collected during an expedition funded by his memorial trust. The specific name zhui honours Zhu Yuan-Ding, a former president of the Shanghai Ocean University and director of the East China Sea Fisheries Research Institute, for his important contributions to education about fisheries and science, particularly the ichthyological knowledge of China.

== Description ==
Sladenis zhui has a rounded head and a compressed body, there is a distinct hump on the nape. The spines on the head are small and rounded. It has 4 dorsal spines in the first dorsal fin, 2 on the head and 2 connected too the second dorsal fin. There are many pointed cirri on the skin, arranged in patches or wavy lines on the head, lower jaw and caudal peduncle. The anal fin has 6 or 7 soft rays. The overall colour of this fish is plain brown. The maximum published total length of 67 cm (26 in).

== Distribution and habitat ==
Sladenia zhui has been recorded from two locations in the Western Pacific Ocean, one in the South China Sea and one in the East China Sea. In addition, 2 unidentified specimens taken in the eastern Indian Ocean off Java are probably Chu's anglerfishes. They have been collected from depths between 655 and 979 m (2,149 and 3,212 ft) on deep rocky and coral reefs on the continental slope.
