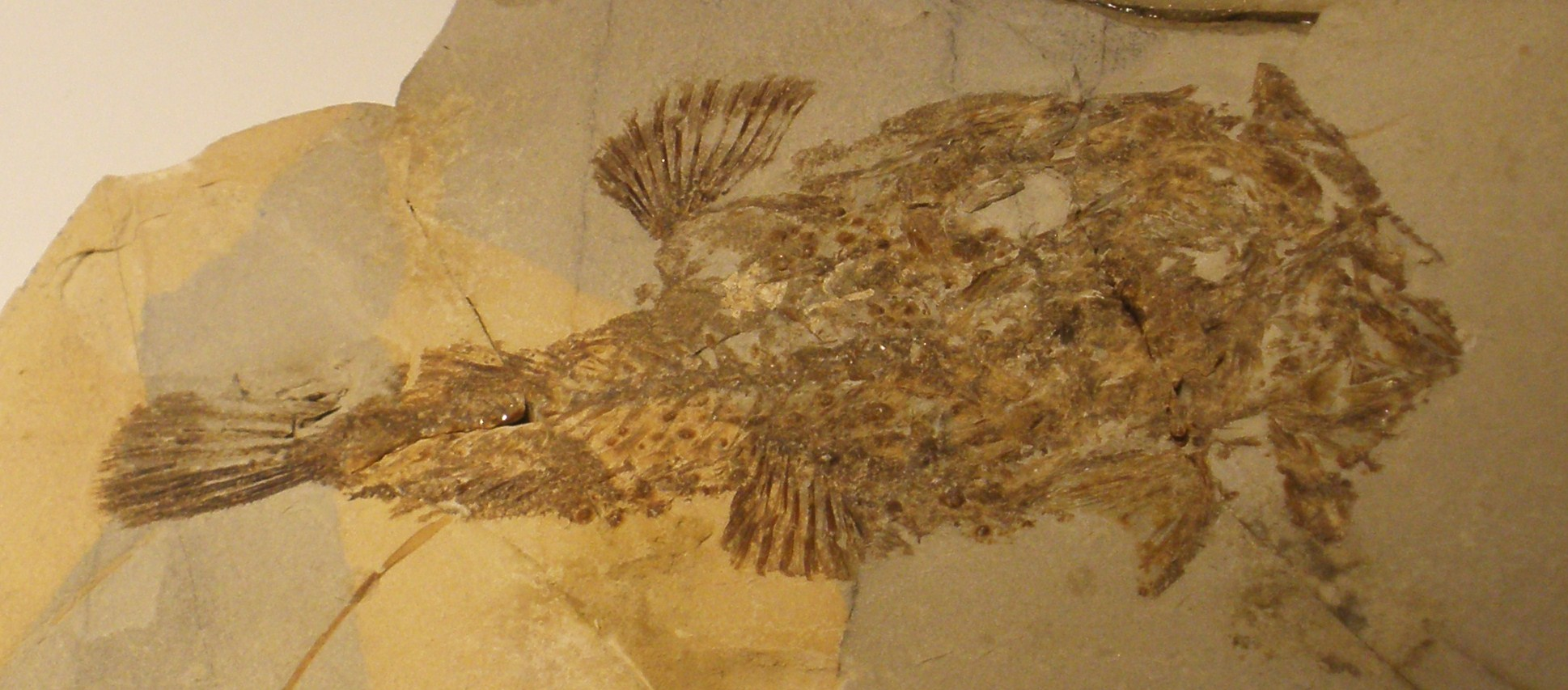
- Fossil of Caruso brachysomus, an extinct fish

Scientific classification
- Kingdom: Animalia
- Phylum: Chordata
- Class: Actinopterygii
- Division: Teleostei
- Order: Lophiiformes
- Family: Lophiidae
- Genus: †Caruso; Pietsch & Carnevale, 2012:
- Species: †C. brachysomus

Binomial name
- †Caruso brachysomus (Agassiz, 1835)

Synonyms
- Lophius brachysomus Agassiz, 1835

= Caruso brachysomus =

Caruso brachysomus Temporal range: Early Eocene

Extinct species of fish

Caruso brachysomus is an extinct species of ray-finned fish belonging to the family Lophiidae, the goosefishes, monkfishes and anglers, within the order Lophiiformes, the anglerfishes. It was described by Louis Agassiz in 1835 from the Monte Bolca locality. It became extinct during the middle Eocene (lowermost Lutetian).

Species known from three or four individuals. Habitat of this species described as place in a tropical or subtropical, moderately deep basin like a coastal lagoon in inner continental shelf regions of the central Tethys Sea, with reduced hydrodynamic energy and episodic anoxic conditions, with soft mud or sand bottoms, much like extant members of the family.

Together with Sharfia mirabilis this species is one of the oldest member of the family Lophiidae known to date. It was initially figured by Giovanni Serafino Volta in 1796, who inaccurately assigned one specimen to the extant Lophius piscatorius and another to Loricaria plecostomus. It was described as its own species, Lophius brachysomus, by Agassiz in 1835. In 2012 the new genus Caruso was proposed for this species, and Caruso was resolved, in a phylogenetic analysis, to be a most closely related to the extant Sladenia, and Caruso and Sladenia are a sister taxon to the rest of Lophiidae.

It was stated to have large triangular opercles, a facial support structure and protective covering for the gills of many bony fish, with concave anterior and anteroventral margins and a peculiar cancellous texture on its medial surface, as seen through its fossilized remains.

Type specimen deposited in the National Museum of Natural History (France). The genus name, Caruso, honours the ichthyologist John H. Caruso of Tulane University, recognising his contributions to ichthyology, particularly his work on anglerfishes.
