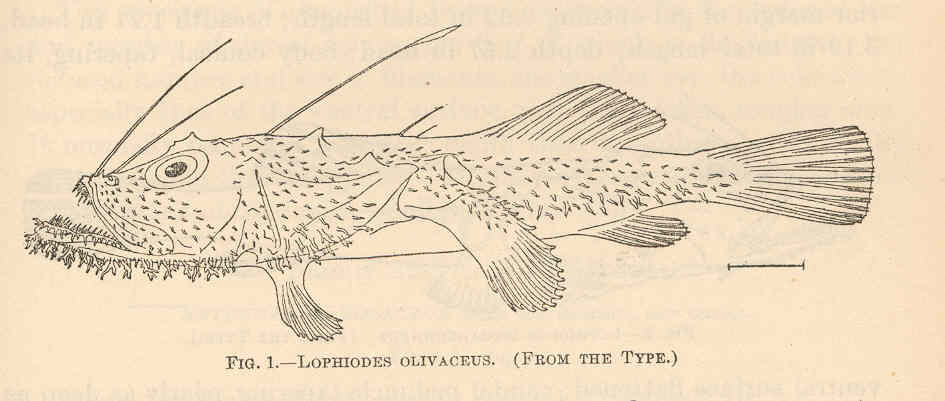
- Lophiodes mutilus
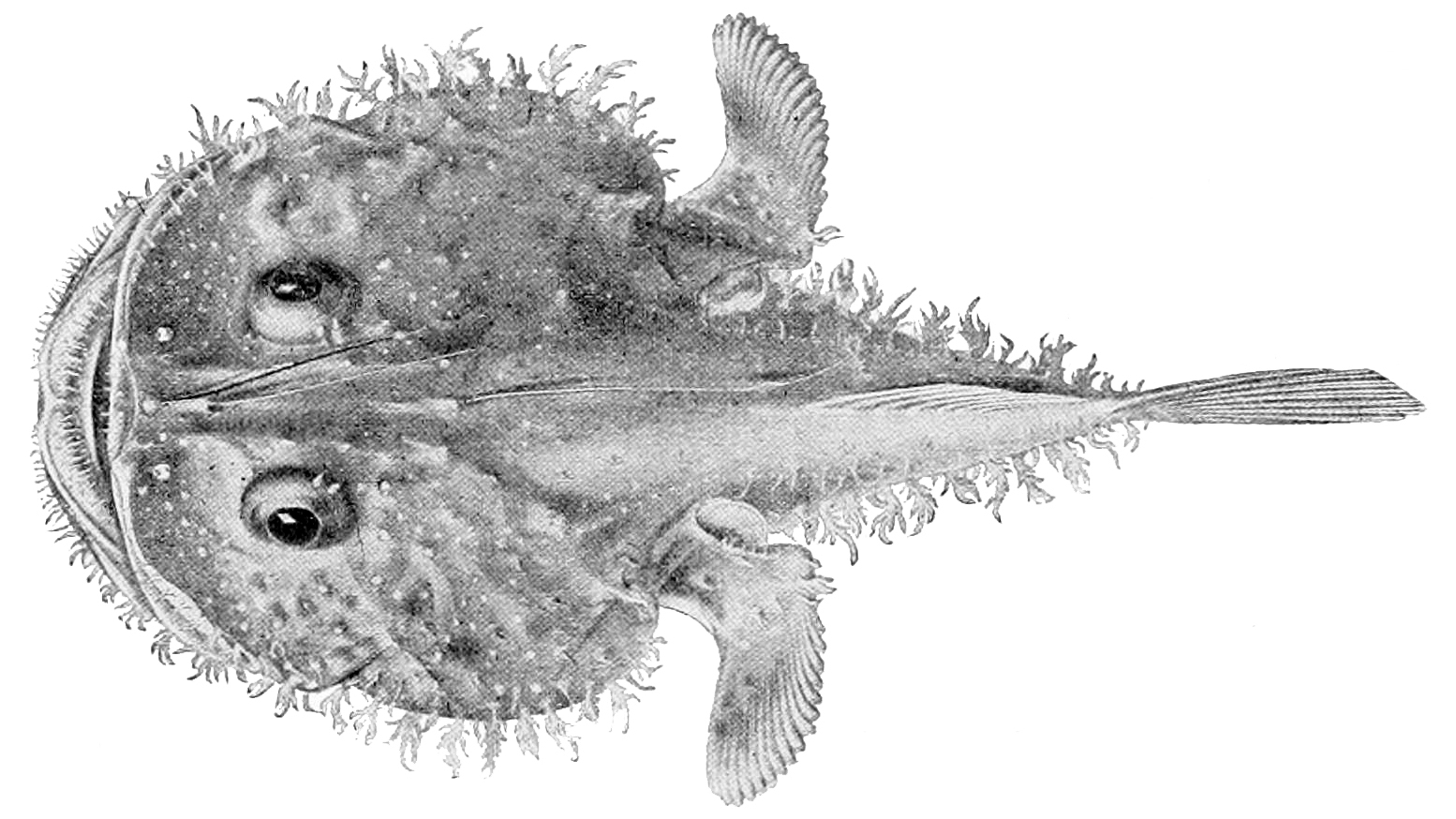
- Lophiodes miacanthus

Scientific classification
- Kingdom: Animalia
- Phylum: Chordata
- Class: Actinopterygii
- Order: Lophiiformes
- Family: Lophiidae
- Genus: Lophiodes; Goode & T. H. Bean, 1896

Type species
- Lophius mutilus Alcock, 1894

Synonyms
- Chirolophius Regan, 1903; Pyrenophorus Y. Le Danois, 1975

= Lophiodes =

Genus of fishes

Lophiodes is a genus of marine ray-finned fishes belonging to the family Lophiidae, the goosefishes, monkfishes and anglers. It is one of four extant genera in the family Lophiidae. The fish in this genus are found in the Atlantic, Indian and Pacific Oceans.

== Taxonomy ==
Lophiodes was first proposed as a monospecific genus in 1896 by the American ichthyologists George Brown Goode and Tarleton Hoffman Bean with Lophius mutilis, a species described in 1894 by the English physician, naturalist and carcinologist Alfred William Alcock with its type locality given as the Bay of Bengal, as its only species. The genus Lophiodes is one of 4 extant genera in the family Lophiidae which the 5th edition of Fishes of the World classifies in the monotypic suborder Lophioidei with the order Lophiiformes. Within the Lophiidae, Lophiodes is the sister taxon to Lophius and Lophiomus with Sladenia as the most basal sister group to the other three genera.

== Etymology ==
Lophiodes means "having the form of Lophius," the type genus of the Lophiidae. Lophius means "mane" and is presumably a reference to the first three spines of the first dorsal fin which are tentacle like, with three smaller spines behind them.

== Species ==
There are currently 18 recognized species in this genus:

- Lophiodes beroe J. H. Caruso, 1981 (White goosefish)
- Lophiodes bruchius J. H. Caruso, 1981
- Lophiodes caulinaris (Garman, 1899) (Spottedtail angler)
- Lophiodes endoi H. C. Ho & K. T. Shao, 2008
- Lophiodes fimbriatus Saruwatari & Mochizuki, 1985
- Lophiodes gracilimanus (Alcock, 1899)
- Lophiodes insidiator (Regan, 1921) (Natal angler)
- Lophiodes iwamotoi H. C. Ho, Séret & K. T. Shao, 2011 (Long-spine angler)
- Lophiodes kempi (Norman, 1935) (Longspine African angler)
- Lophiodes lugubris (Alcock, 1894)
- Lophiodes maculatus H. C. Ho, Séret & K. T. Shao, 2011 (Spotted angler)
- Lophiodes miacanthus (C. H. Gilbert, 1905)
- Lophiodes monodi Y. Le Danois, 1971 (Club-bait goosefish)
- Lophiodes mutilus (Alcock, 1894) (Smooth angler)
- Lophiodes naresi (Günther, 1880) (Goosefish)
- Lophiodes reticulatus J. H. Caruso & Suttkus, 1979 (Reticulated goosefish)
- Lophiodes spilurus (Garman, 1899) (Threadfin angler)
- Lophiodes triradiatus (R. E. Lloyd, 1909) (Shortspine goosefish)

== Characteristics ==
Lophiodes goosefishes are characterised by having the head and the front part of the body flattened and wide, with the body becoming slenderer towards the tail. They have a pair of smooth ridges which run from the snout to the eyes and the bone behind the eye has a spine, with another spine at the symphysis of the jaws. The wide mouth is armed with numerous long, sharp teeth. The large gill opening is located behind the base of the pectoral fin but extends to its front too. The dorsal fin is divided into two with the first comprising 3 separate spines in the head with a few spines within a membrane above the pectoral fin while the second is supported by 8 soft rays. The first spine on the head is the angling pole, the illicium, has a flap of flesh, the esca, at its tip which is used as a lure to attract prey to within reach of the large mouth. The anal fin contains 8 soft rays and is located quite far back on the body. The largest species is the club-bait goosefish (L. monodi) with a maximum published total length of 52 cm (20 in), while the smallest is L. fimbriatus with a maximum published standard length of 7.5 cm (3.0 in).

== Distribution ==
Lophiodus goosefishes are found in the tropical and subtropical parts of the Atlantic, Indian and Pacific Oceans.
