= Agwi-jjim =

Korean spicy angler fish dish

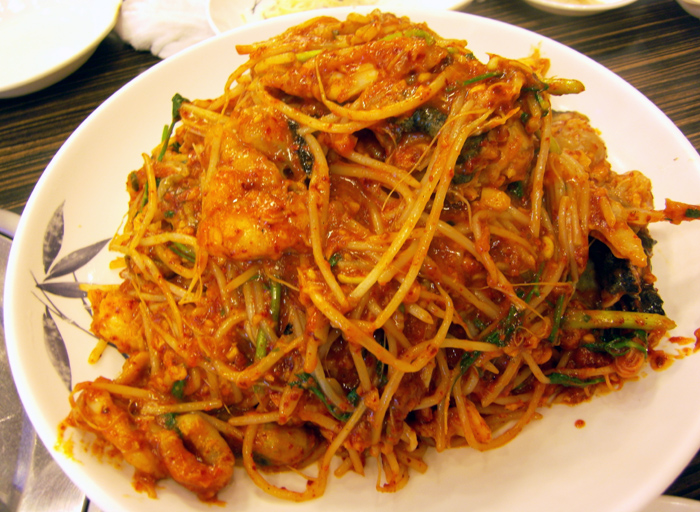
- Type: Jjim
- Place of origin: South Korea
- Main ingredients: blackmouth angler

Korean name
- Hangul: 아귀찜
- RR: agwijjim
- MR: agwitchim
- IPA: [a.ɡɥi.t͈ɕim]

Gyeongsang dialect
- Hangul: 아구찜
- RR: agujjim
- MR: agutchim
- IPA: [a.ɡu.t͈ɕim]

Agwi-jjim (Korean: 아귀찜) or agu-jjim (아구찜) is a Korean jjim dish made with blackmouth angler, the fish known as agwi in Korean. The name of the dish is usually translated as "braised spicy angler".

The dish is seasoned with hot chili pepper powder, doenjang, ganjang (soy sauce), minced garlic, and chopped scallions to make it spicy and hot. However, other ingredients such as kongnamul (soybean sprouts), mideodeok (미더덕, Styela clava), and minari (미나리, Oenanthe javanica) also play an important role in giving agujjim a refreshing and fragrant flavor. The fish is an excellent source of protein and has a rich taste as well as a palatable chewy texture.

== History ==
Its origins are known to be a fish market in the city of Masan, South Gyeongsang Province where local fishermen would ask cooks from the market eateries to create a tasty dish from the ugly fish. Until the 1940s, the fish was not eaten and was frequently discarded due to its ugly appearance and low commercial value. However, as fish began to become more scarce in the late 20th century, the newly found delicacy became popular.

Agujjim is still considered a local specialty of Masan, especially around the Odong-dong district. In the traditional Masan agujjim, agwi dried for 15 days to 30 days is used and then marinated with seasonings, while other regions use fresh agwi after its internal organs have been taken out.

Seoul has two famous agujjim streets, in Sinsa-dong and the Jongno district. The popular jjim dish is eaten with bowls of cooked rice, or sometimes restaurants will stir-fry the remaining sauce with rice and additional vegetables on the grill to make Bokkeumbap with a crispy charred crust.

Agujjim is also a popular anju, or dish associated with alcoholic beverages and is usually paired with soju.

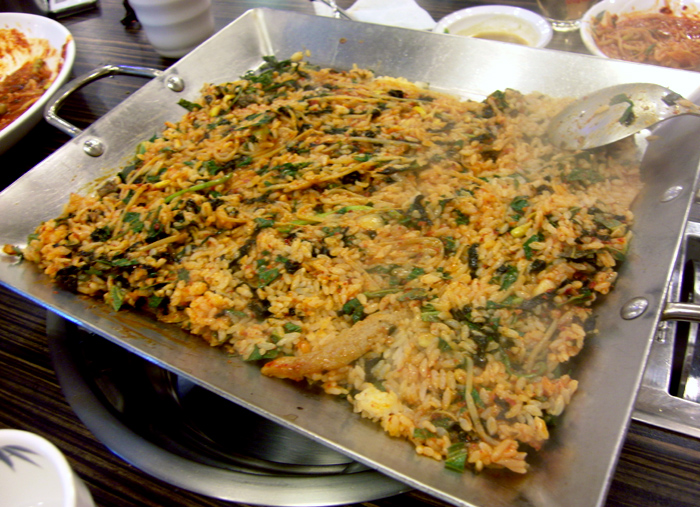
Bokkeumbap made from agujjim sauce

== See also ==
- Jorim
- Kongnamul
