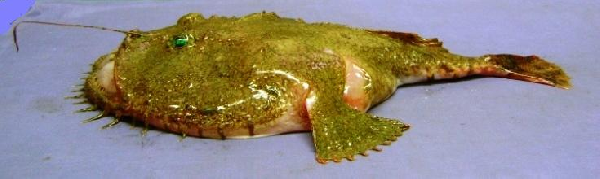

Conservation status
- Least Concern (IUCN 3.1)

Scientific classification
- Kingdom: Animalia
- Phylum: Chordata
- Class: Actinopterygii
- Order: Lophiiformes
- Suborder: Lophioidei
- Family: Lophiidae
- Genus: Lophiomus; T. N. Gill, 1883
- Species: L. setigerus

Binomial name
- Lophiomus setigerus (Vahl, 1797)

Synonyms
- Lophius setigerus Vahl, 1797; Lophius viviparus Bloch & Schneider, 1801; Lophius indicus Alcock, 1889; Chirolophius laticeps Ogilby, 1910; Lophiomus longicephalus Tanaka, 1918; Chirolophius malabaricus Samuel, 1963

= Lophiomus =

Species of fish

Lophiomus is a monospecific genus of marine ray-finned fish belonging to the family, Lophiidae, the goose fishes, monkfishes or anglers. The only species in the genus is Lophiomus setigerus, the blackmouth angler, blackmouth goosefish, broadheaded angler or broadhead goosefish. This fish is found in the Indo-Pacific.

== Taxonomy ==
Lophiomus was first proposed as a genus in 1883 by the American biologist Theodore Gill with Lophius setigerus as its only species. Lophius setigerus was first formally described in 1797 by the Danish-Norwegian botanist, herbalist and zoologist Martin Vahl with its type locality given as "China, western Pacific Ocean". The genus Lophiodes is one of 4 extant genera in the family Lophiidae which the 5th edition of Fishes of the World classifies in the monotypic suborder Lophioidei with the order Lophiiformes. Within the Lophiidae Lophiomus is most closely related to Lophius with Lophiodes'' being the sister taxon to these and with Sladenia as the most basal sister group to the other three genera.

== Etymology ==
Lophiomus was coined by Guill when he proposed the genus as being different from Lophius but he did not explain the suffix -omus. In 1898, David Starr Jordan and Barton Warren Evermann posited that it was derived from omos, meaning "shoulder", stating that Gill had alluded to a "trifid hemeral spine" which had been mentioned by Gill in 1878 but this was a reference to Lophius americanus, under the name Lophius piscatorius. The specific name setigerus is a compound of seta, which means "bristle" and iger, meaning "to bear", an allusion to the many spines on the upper body and sides of this fish.

== Description ==
Lophiomus goosefishes have a strongly flattened head and body. The ridges on the frontal, maxillary and dentary bones have a covering of conical spines which makes them rough. There are 2 spines between the eyes. The body is plain dark brown on the upper body and pale on the lower body. The fins are the same colour as the area of body they are next to. The maximum published total length of this species is 40 cm (16 in), although 30 cm (12 in) is more typical.

== Distribution and habitat ==
Lophiomus has a wide Indo-Pacific distribution from the eastern African coast between the Red Sea in the north to South Africa, through the Indian Ocean, including the Persian Gulf, east into the Pacific Ocean as far east as Fiji and Marshall Islands, north to Japan and south to Australia and New Caledonia. This species is found at depths between 30 and 800 m (98 and 2,625 ft) on substrates of sand or mud.

== Fisheries ==
Lophiomus was, in the past, a species caught only as bycatch but it is now a target for commercial fisheries in China, Japan and Korea. It is a valuable catch and the liver is regarded as a delicacy. In Korea it is used to make the dish agujjim.
