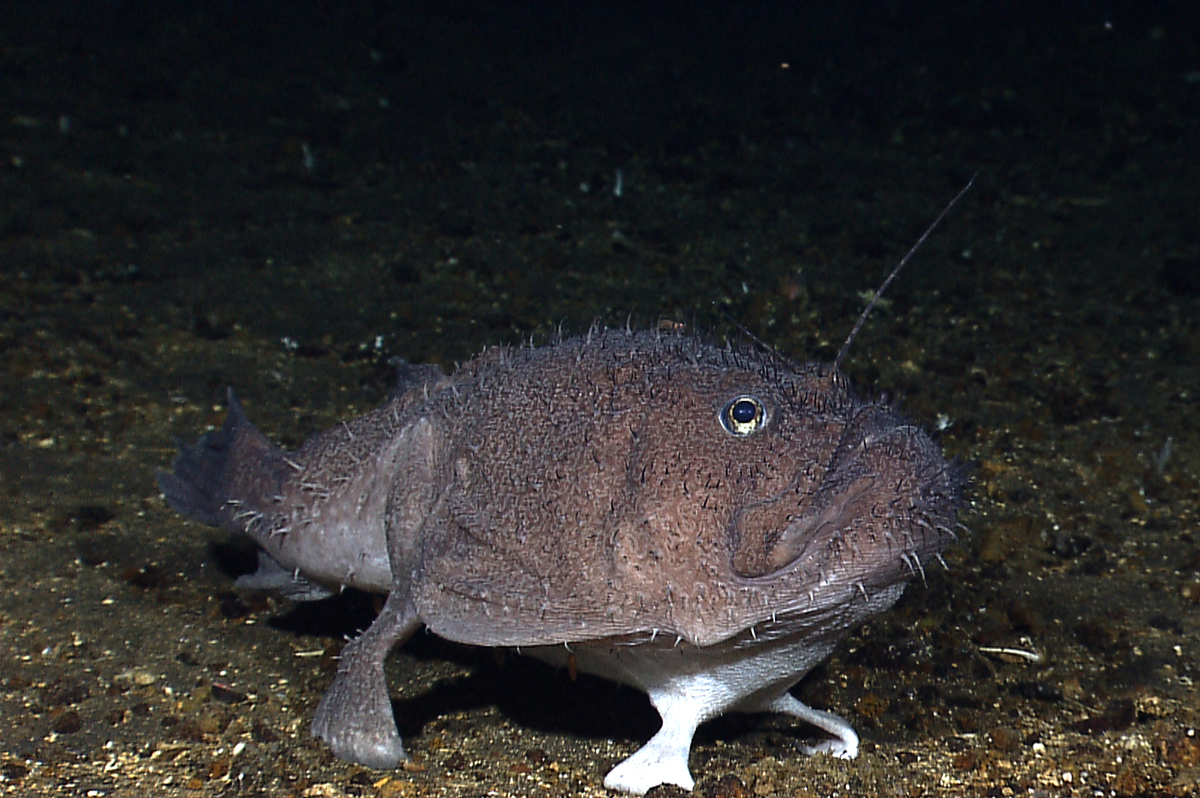

Conservation status
- Least Concern (IUCN 3.1)

Scientific classification
- Kingdom: Animalia
- Phylum: Chordata
- Class: Actinopterygii
- Order: Lophiiformes
- Family: Lophiidae
- Genus: Sladenia
- Species: S. remiger

Binomial name
- Sladenia remiger H. M. Smith & Radcliffe, 1912

= Celebes monkfish =

Species of fish

The Celebes monkfish (Sladenia remiger) is a species of marine ray-finned fish belonging to the family Lophiidae, the goose fishes, monkfishes or anglers. This species is found in the Indo-Pacific.

== Taxonomy ==
The Celebes monkfish was first formally described in 1912 by the American zoologists Hugh McCormick Smith and Lewis Radcliffe with its type locality given as the Gulf of Tomini, Sulawesi in Indonesia. The genus Sladenia is one of 4 extant genera in the family Lophiidae which the 5th edition of Fishes of the World classifies in the monotypic suborder Lophioidei within the order Lophiiformes.

== Etymology ==
The Celebes monkfish has the genus name Sladenia which honours Percy Sladen, the British echinoderm biologist. The holotype of S. gardineri was collected during an expedition funded by his memorial trust. The specific name remiger means "bearing oars", an allusion Smith and Radcliffe did not explain but is likely to refer to the paddle-like pectoral fins.

== Description ==
The Celebes monkfish has a rounded, rather than being flattned, head and front part of the body, tapering towards the caudal fin. There are fewer spines on the sides and top of the head compared to other Lophiids. The ridges on the frontal bones are smooth. There are only three dorsal spines, two on the head and a single spine behind the head.The front spine is the Illicium, or "fishing rod". The second dorsal fin contains nine soft rays while the anal fin has seven. The overall colour is greyish brown. This species has a largest published total length of 67.5 cm (26.6 in).

== Distribution and habitat ==
The Celebes monkfish was known from only the holotype, however, it is now known to be widespread in the eastern Indian and western Pacific Oceans with records from The Exmouth Plateau to the North West Cape in Western Australia, the Coral Sea off Queensland, from off Tasmania, from the Kermadec Ridge and Hawaii. This species has been found at depths between 780 and 4,540 m (2,560 and 14,900 ft) in rocky reefs on the continental slope and on seamounts.
