= Sharfia =

Sharfia Temporal range: Early Eocene

Scientific classification
- Kingdom: Animalia
- Phylum: Chordata
- Class: Actinopterygii
- Division: Teleostei
- Order: Lophiiformes
- Family: Lophiidae
- Genus: †Sharfia; Pietsch & Carnevale, 2011

Type species
- †Sharfia mirabilis Pietsch & Carnevale, 2011

Extinct species of fish

Sharfia mirabilis is an extinct species of anglerfish in the family Lophiidae. It was discovered in 2011 during a review of fossil material at the Muséum national d'histoire naturelle in Paris. The fossil material was collected from the Monte Bolca Lagerstätte, one of the earliest known Eocene fossil sites. The fossil material was originally identified as Lophius brachysomus.

The fish lived around 50 million years ago during the Ypresian stage, making it the oldest lophiid found to date based on articulated skeletal remains. It has several features that distinguish it from other lophiids, particularly its opercular bones. It probably inhabited the muddy and sandy bottoms of the inner Tethys Ocean.
