= Kongnamul-bulgogi =

Korean dish

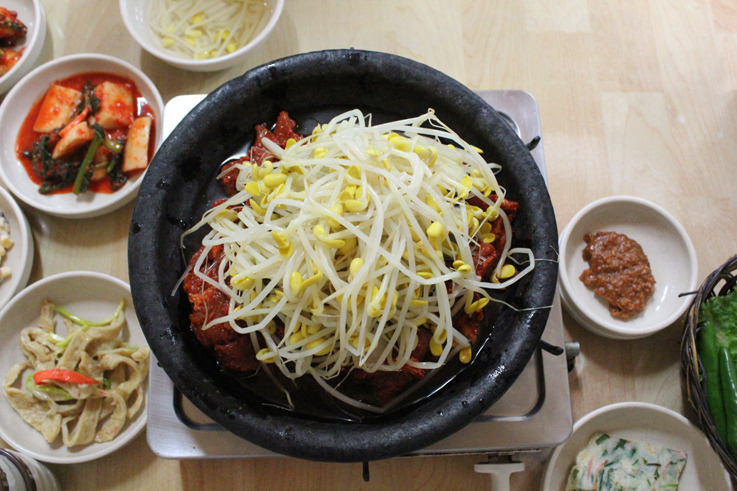

Korean name
- Hangul: 콩나물불고기
- Lit.: soybean sprout bulgogi
- RR: kongnamul bulgogi
- MR: k'ongnamul pulgogi

Kongnamul-bulgogi (Korean: 콩나물불고기; lit. 'soybean sprout bulgogi'), sometimes abbreviated as kongbul (콩불), is a modern Korean dish. It is a combination of bulgogi, bean sprouts, rice cake, vegetables, noodles, sausages, and spicy sauce. The ingredients are roasted in a large pan. The dish has become increasingly popular in South Korea, especially among teenagers, due to its low price and appealing flavour.

== History ==
Cooked Kongbul

Kongnamul-bulgogi restaurants thrived in Jeonju during the 1980s. The dish enjoyed a resurgence with the success of the Kongbul restaurant franchise, which opened in 2008.

== Variations ==
The original dish is a combination of the sauce, bean sprouts, and pork. However, there are several variations to this recipe. For example, squid or chicken can be added, and the spicy sauce can be replaced by a sweet one. Additionally, rice cakes, boiled eggs, noodles, dumplings, ham, and cheese are options for any type of kongbul.

== See also ==
- Korean cuisine
- Kimchi
- Gochujang
