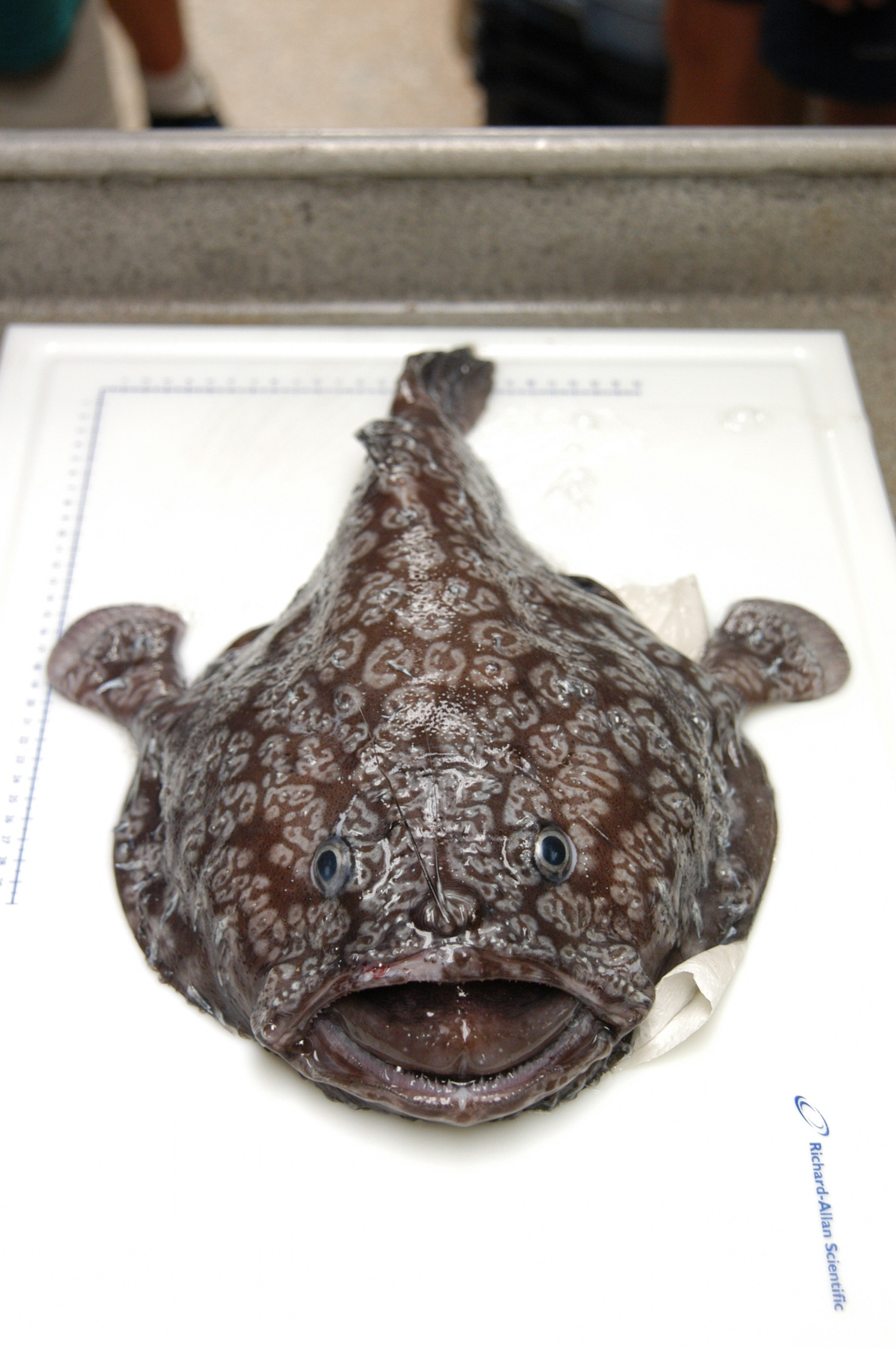
- S. shaefersi

Scientific classification
- Kingdom: Animalia
- Phylum: Chordata
- Class: Actinopterygii
- Order: Lophiiformes
- Suborder: Lophioidei
- Family: Lophiidae
- Genus: Sladenia; Regan, 1908

Type species
- Sladenia gardineri Regan, 1908

= Sladenia (fish) =

Genus of fishes

Sladenia is a genus of marine ray-finned fishes belonging to the family Lophiidae, which includes the goosefishes, monkfishes and anglers. These are deepwater anglers found in the Indian Ocean, the Caribbean Sea and the Western Pacific Ocean.

== Taxonomy ==
Sladenia was first proposed as a monospecific genus in 1908 by the English ichthyologist Charles Tate Regan when he described the new species Sladenia gardineri. S. gardineri had a type locality of Salomon Atoll in the Chagos Archipelago of the Indian Ocean. The genus Sladenia is one of 4 extant genera in the family Lophiidae which the 5th edition of Fishes of the World classifies in the monotypic suborder Lophioidei with the order Lophiiformes. Within the Lophiidae, Sladenia is regarded as the most basal taxon and is the sister group to the other three genera, with Lophiodes being sister group to the clade including Lophiomus and Lophius.

== Etymology ==
Sladenia was named for Percy Sladen (1849–1900), a British echinoderm biologist. The holotype of S. gardineri was collected during an expedition funded by his memorial trust.

== Species ==
There are currently four recognized species in this genus:

- Sladenia gardineri Regan, 1908
- Sladenia remiger H. M. Smith & Radcliffe, 1912 (Celebes monkfish)
- Sladenia shaefersi J. H. Caruso & Bullis, 1976
- Sladenia zhui Y. Ni, H. L. Wu & S. Li, 2012

== Characteristics ==
Sladenia goosefishes are characterised from the other Lophiid genera by have a rounded head and body rather than a dorsoventrally compressed head and body. They have fewer spines on the head and compressed, rather than depressed, caudal peduncles. They have a smooth ridge running from the eye to the top of the snout. There are large teeth in the middle of the roof of the mouth, with smaller teeth at the sides. There are only 2 dorsal spines on the head, compared to 3 in the other genera, and 1 or 2 dorsal spines behind the head, the fourth spine sometimes being absent. The largest species in the genus is S. zhiu with a maximum published total length of 65 cm (26 in), while the smallest is S. shaeferis with a maximum published standard length of 28 cm (11 in).

== Distribution ==
Sladenia goosefishes are found in the western Atlantic, Indian and Pacific Oceans. The type species, S. gardineri, is found in the Chagos Archipelago in the central Indian Ocean and has been recorded off New South Wales. S. remiger has a wide range from Sulawesi to Hawaii as far south as New Zealand and Tasmania. S. shaefersi is found in the Western Atlantic Ocean, and S. zhui is found in the East China Sea and the South China Sea.
