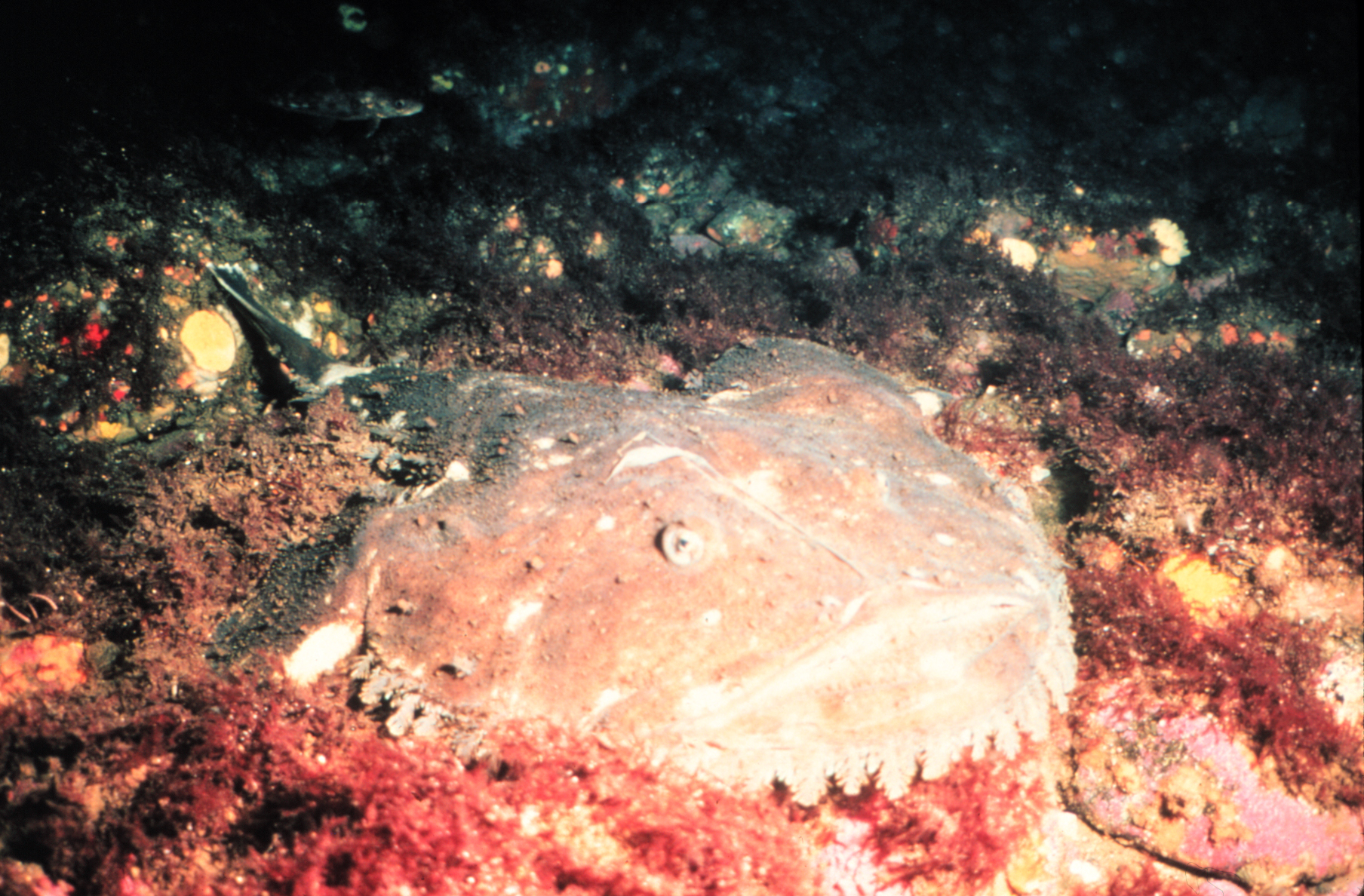

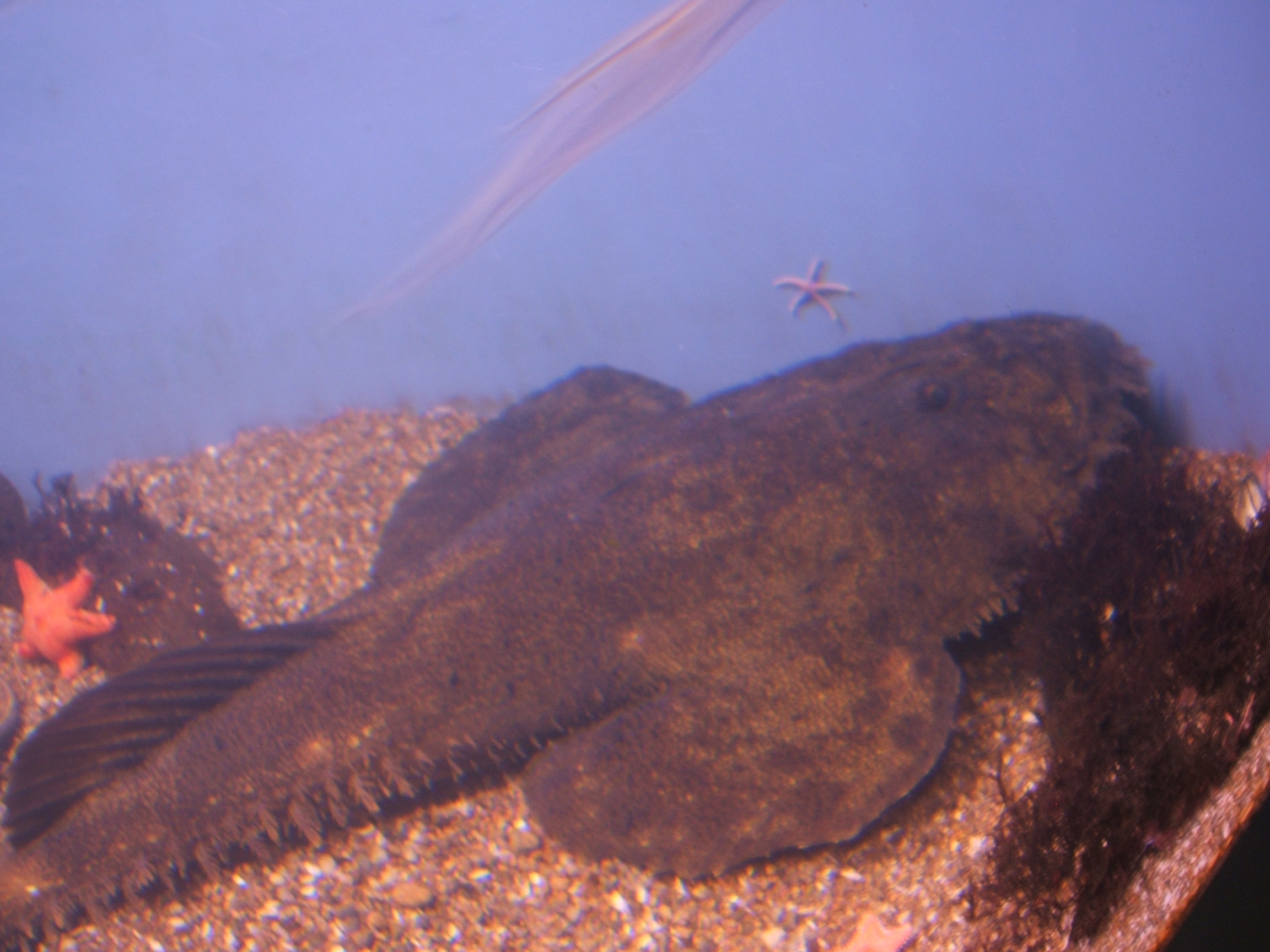

Conservation status
- Secure (NatureServe)

Scientific classification
- Kingdom: Animalia
- Phylum: Chordata
- Class: Actinopterygii
- Division: Teleostei
- Order: Lophiiformes
- Family: Lophiidae
- Genus: Lophius
- Species: L. americanus

Binomial name
- Lophius americanus Valenciennes, 1837

= Lophius americanus =

Lophius americanus Temporal range: Pliocene-Recent, 5.3–0 Ma

Species of fish

Lophius americanus is a goosefish in the family Lophiidae, also called all-mouth, American anglerfish, American monkfish, bellows-fish, devil-fish, headfish, molligut, satchel-mouth, or wide-gape. It is native to the eastern coast of North America.

== Description ==
The American anglerfish is unique in its appearance and has no relatives with which it can be confused in the areas where it is caught. A fish of lesser importance than other food fish in the region, such as cod, its various names suggest its unusual appearance - a very large mouth, more than twice the width of the tail, with several spines and strong teeth, enabling it to snare prey larger than itself. The body is flattened dorsoventrally to allow it to hide on the sea floor. The front of the head carries erectile spines, the primary of which has a flattened end to resemble a small organism or piece of algae. The pectoral fins are like wide fans behind the head, and the pelvic fins are like small hands below the head.

The American anglerfish can grow to a length of 140 cm (55 in), but 100 cm (39 in) is a more usual size. The greatest recorded weight is 22.6 kg (50 lb) and the greatest recorded age is 30 years.

== Distribution and habitat ==
The American anglerfish is found in the western Atlantic from Newfoundland and Quebec south to northern Florida, but is commoner in the more northerly parts of its range, north of Cape Hatteras. It is a demersal fish living close to the seabed at depths down to about 2,000 feet (610 m). It is found on sand bottoms, gravel, shell fragments, mud and clay.

== Behaviour ==
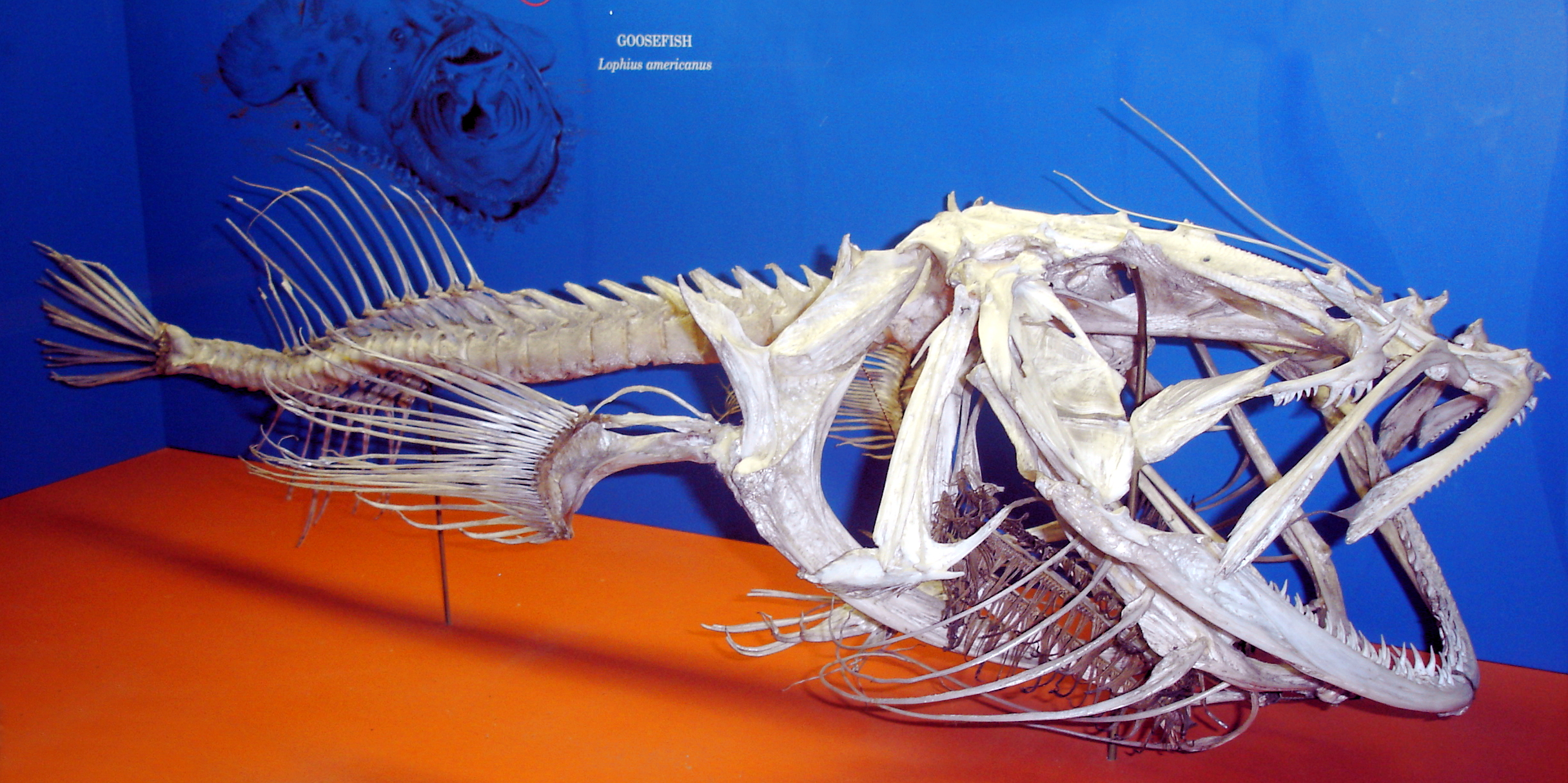
Skeleton

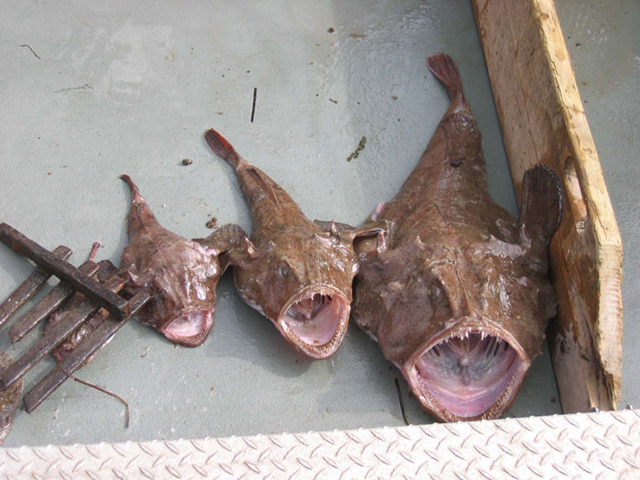
Lophius americanus of various sizes

=== Feeding ===
The American anglerfish is an ambush predator. It spends most of its time on the seabed partly covered in sediment waiting for suitable prey to pass. It can swim slowly or "walk" with the help of its pectoral fins. Its diet normally consists of fin and ray fish, squids, cuttlefish and occasionally carrion. After storms it has been reported on the sea surface where it has been recorded as catching seabirds. Cannibalism is known to occur among American anglerfish. Incidences of this behavior are more common among larger specimens, and particularly among actively reproducing females.

=== Breeding and lifecycle ===
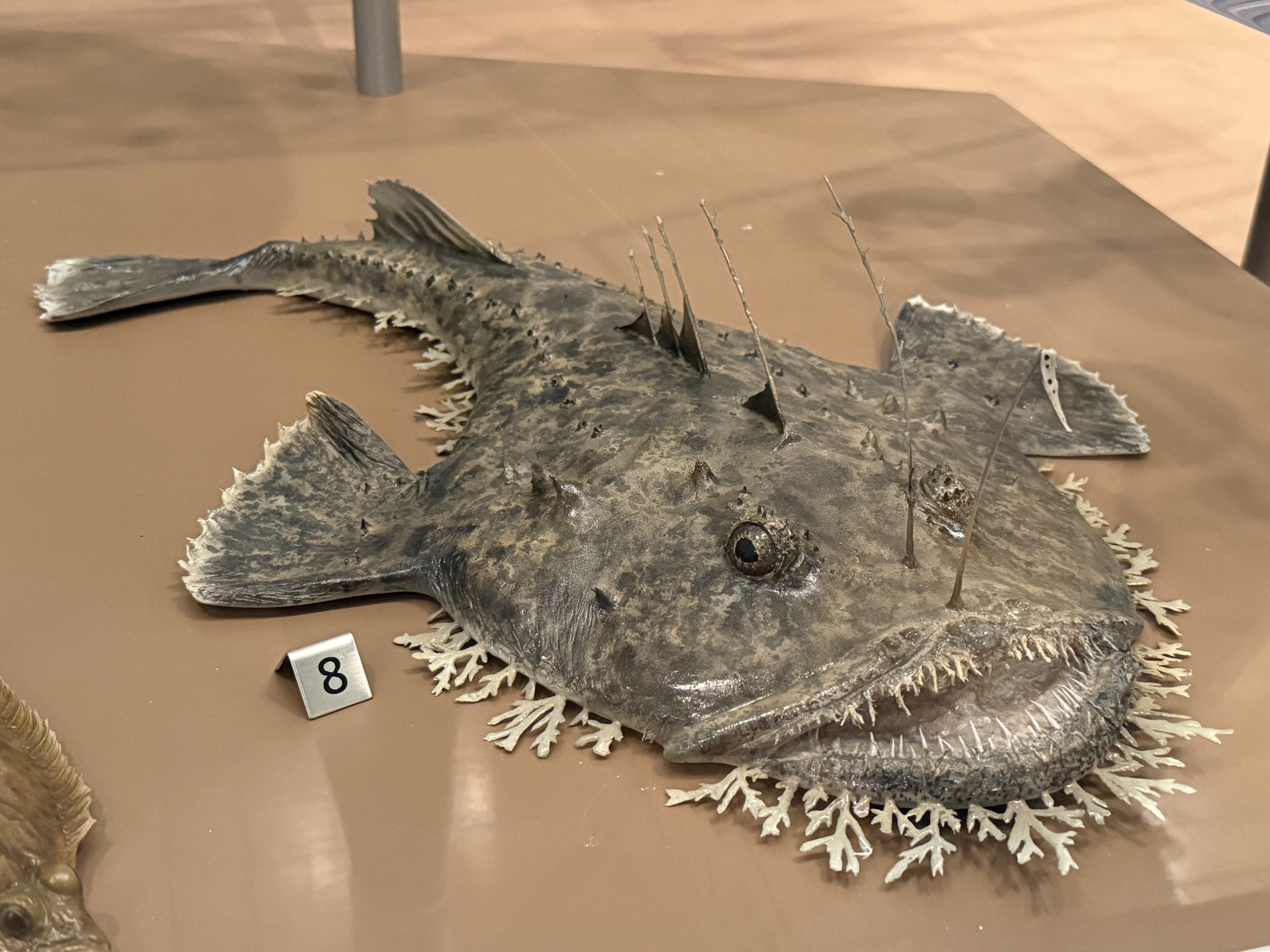
Taxidermied specimen showing the usually hidden dorsal spines

Spawning takes place in the summer with a peak in May and June. The eggs are large and are believed to be unique among fish in being attached to a floating mucus veil. The number of eggs in a veil can range from 1 to 3 million and the veil drifts on the surface of the sea. The eggs hatch after 6 to 100 days, depending on the sea temperature, and remain protected within the veil for a few days, absorbing nutrients from their yolk sacs. They then become pelagic and join other fish larvae in the "ichthyoplankton community". The larvae feed on zooplankton and look quite different from the adult fish, being laterally compressed and having long dorsal and pectoral fin rays. When about 7 centimetres (2.8 in) long they become juveniles, changing their appearance over a period of several weeks into the adult shape and starting to live on the seabed. They grow fast in their first year and more slowly thereafter.

== Food use ==
The flesh of the anglerfish is located primarily in the body, less so in the "shoulders" and cheeks. The flesh is very white and moist, becoming quite firm when cooked. It is served both in soups and grilled, and is similar in texture to the flesh of crustaceans. Fillets are thick and boneless resembling crab or lobster tail. Connoisseurs believe the liver is also excellent; in Japan, it is consumed as Ankimo. The fish is covered with a soft, scaleless, elastic skin, under which another thin edible membrane covers the flesh. Though much less so than in cod, one can sometimes find parasitic worms in the flesh of anglerfish, whose opacity can make them easier to find. Worms are usually found between the skin and outer portion of the flesh ranging in size from a few millimeters to over one inch.
