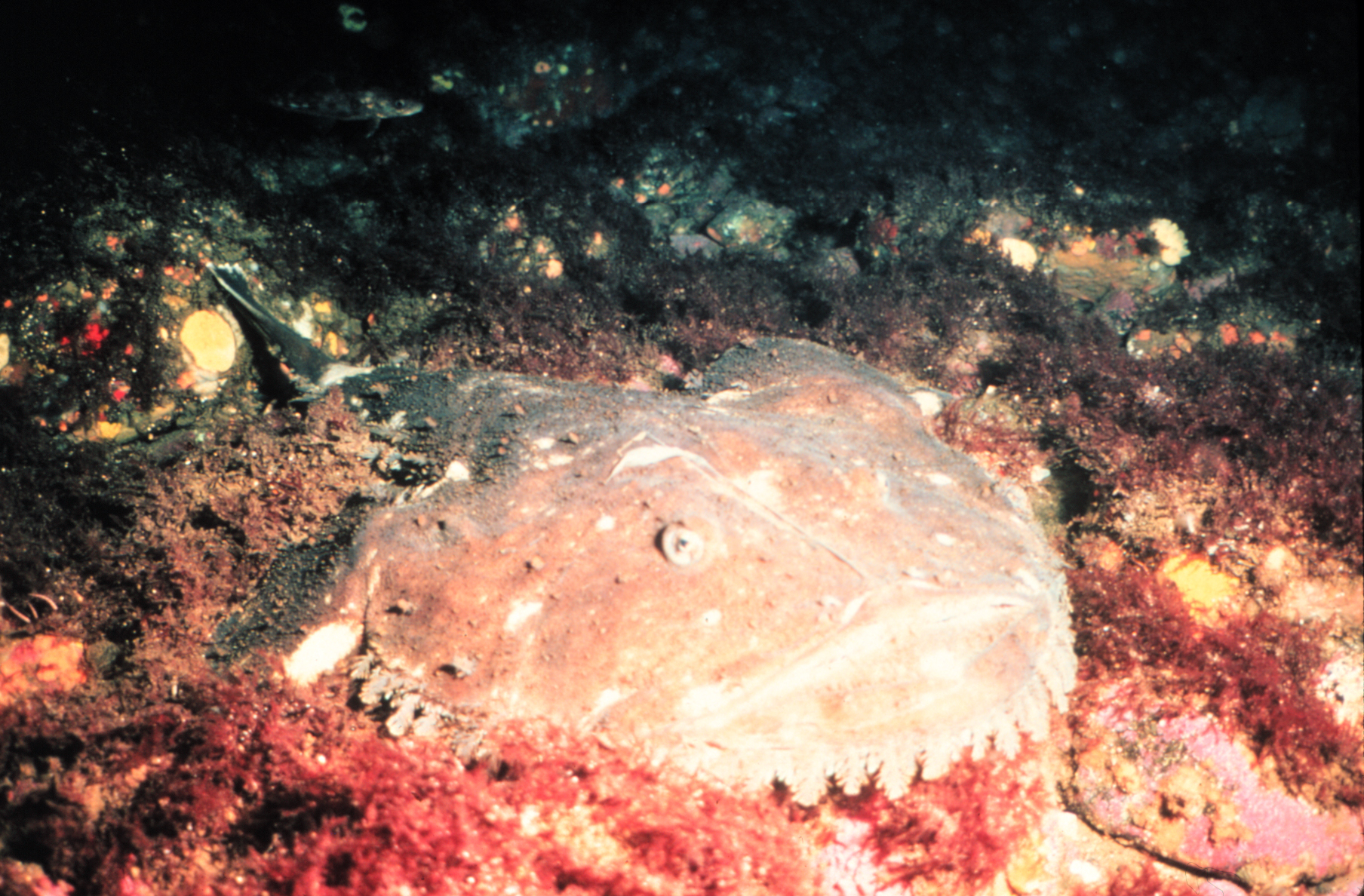
- Lophius americanus
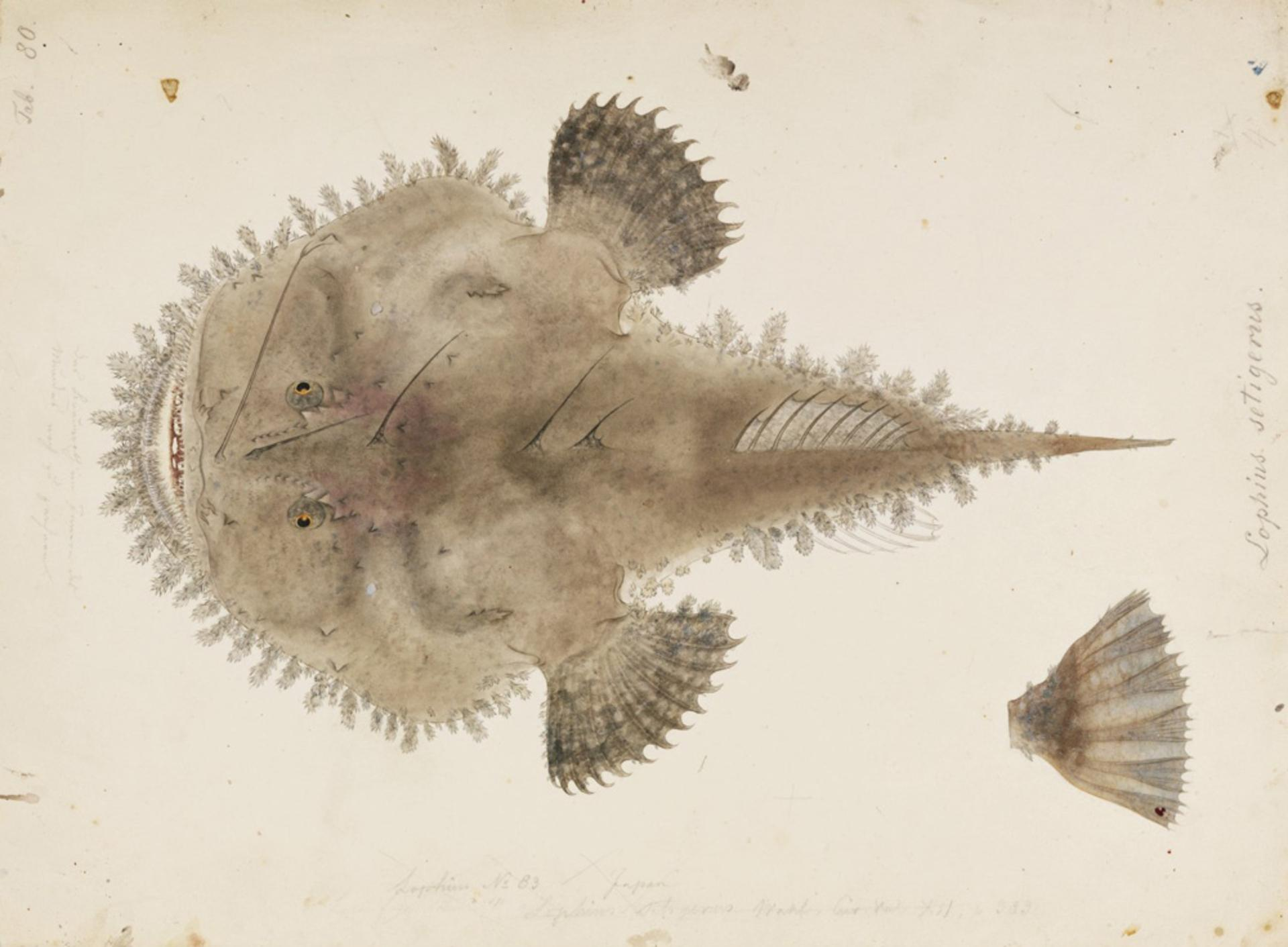
- Lophiomus setigerus

Scientific classification
- Kingdom: Animalia
- Phylum: Chordata
- Class: Actinopterygii
- Division: Teleostei
- Clade: Percomorpha
- Order: Lophiiformes
- Suborder: Lophioidei; Regan, 1912
- Family: Lophiidae; Rafinesque, 1810

= Goosefish =

Goosefish Temporal range: Early Eocene to present

Family of fishes

Goosefishes, sometimes called anglers or monkfishes, form the family Lophiidae of marine ray-finned fishes belonging to the order Lophiiformes, the anglerfishes. The family includes 30 recognized species. These fishes are found in all the world's oceans except for the Antarctic Ocean.

== Taxonomy ==
The goosefish family, Lophiidae, was first proposed as a genus in 1810 by the French polymath and naturalist Constantine Samuel Rafinesque. The Lophiidae is the only family in the monotypic suborder Lophioidei, this is one of 5 suborders of the Lophiiformes. The Lophioidei is considered to be the most basal of the suborders in the order.

== Etymology ==
The goosefish family, Lophiidae, takes its name from its type genus, Lophius. Lophius means "mane" and is presumably a reference to the first 3 spines of the first dorsal fin which are tentacle like, with 3 smaller spines behind them.

== Genera ==
The goosefish family, Lophiidae, contains the following extant genera:

- Lophiodes Goode & Bean, 1896
- Lophiomus Gill, 1883
- Lophius Linnaeus, 1758
- Sladenia Regan, 1908

=== Fossil taxa ===
The following extinct taxa are also among those included in the family Lophiidae:

- Genus †Caruso Carnevale & Pietsch, 2012
  - †Caruso brachysomus (Agassiz, 1835) (Early Eocene of Italy)
- Genus †Emmachaere D. S. Jordan & Gilbert, 1919
  - †Emmachaere rhomalea (D. S. Jordan, 1921) (Late Miocene of California, US)
- Genus †Eosladenia Bannikov, 2004
  - †Eosladenia caucasica Bannikov, 2004 (Middle Eocene of North Caucasus, Russia)
- Genus †Sharfia Peitsch & Carnevale, 2011
  - †Sharfia mirabilis Pietsch & Carnevale, 2011 (Early Eocene of Italy)

== Characteristics ==
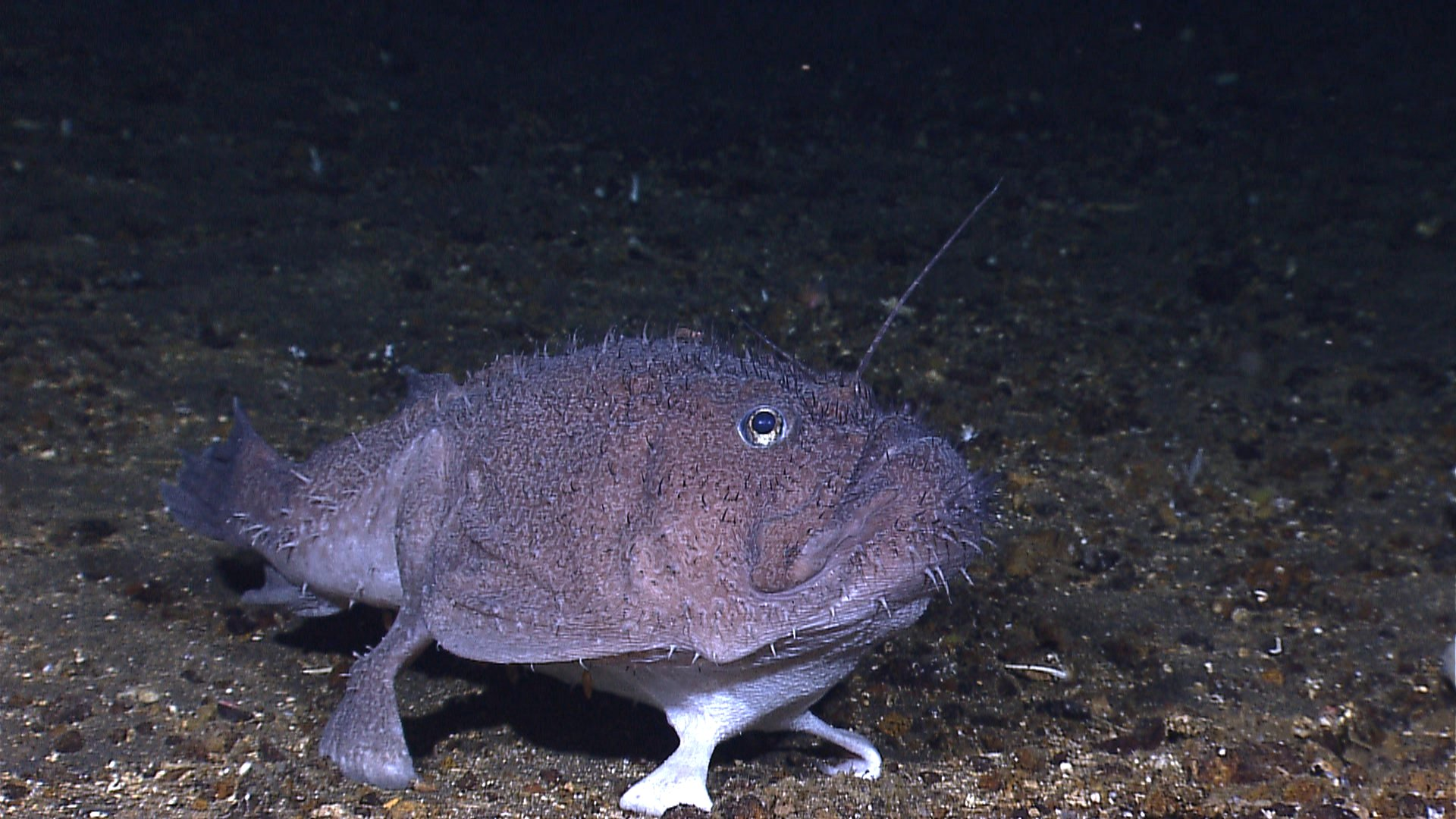
A goosefish perched on the sea floor

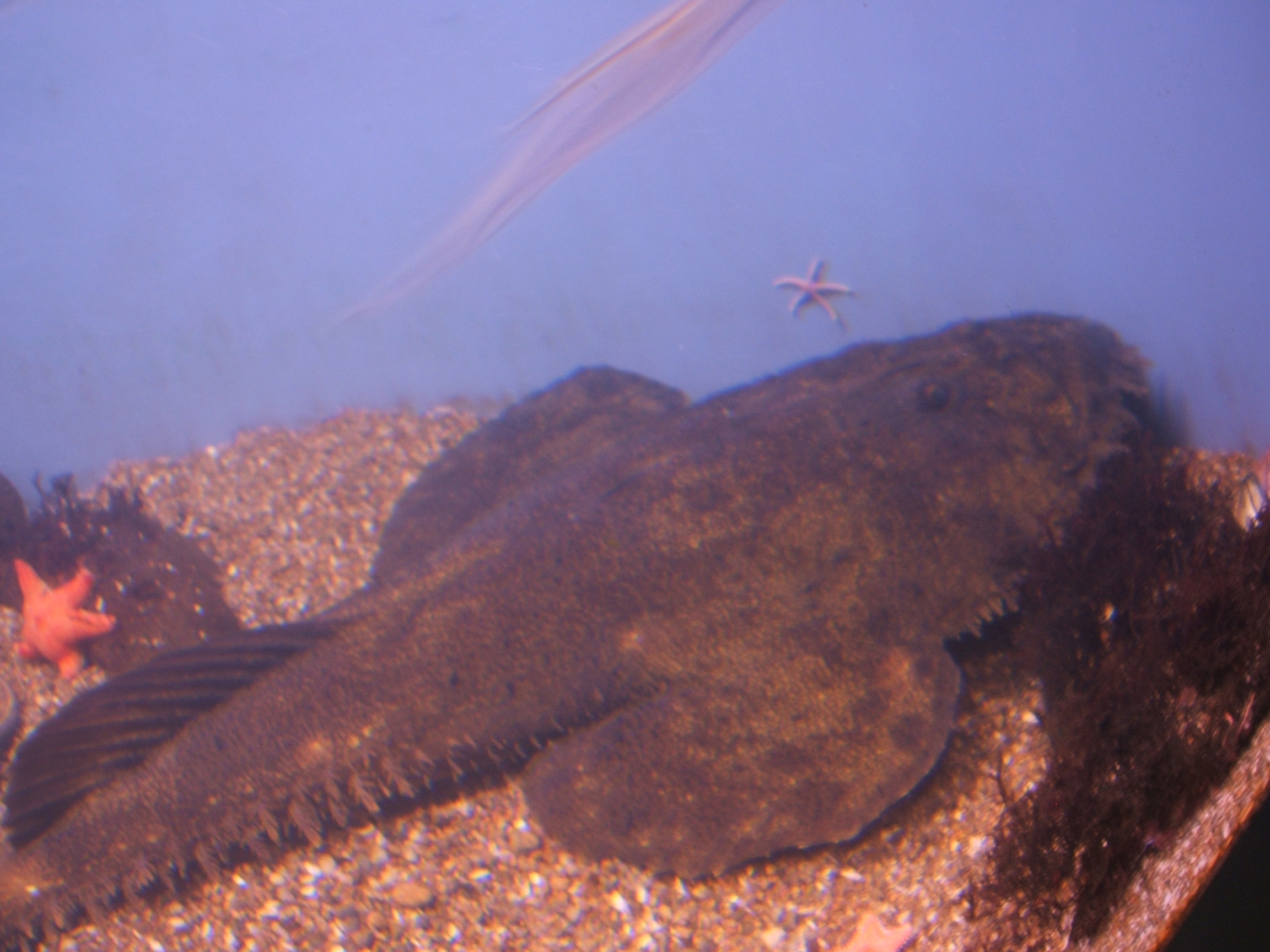
American angler (Lophius americanus) at the New England Aquarium

Goosefishes in the family Lophiidae have flattened heads and bodies covered in thin skin and are further characterised by the possession of pelvic fins with the first, spiny dorsal fin having its origin close to the rear of the head and this fin is supported by between one and three spines. The frontmost spine, the illicium, has a flap of flesh, the esca, at its tip and is used as a lure to attract prey to within reach of the cavernous mouth. There are 4 pharyngobranchials, the 4th being toothed, and they have a large pseudobranch. The body has no scales and the frontal bones of the skull are fused. They have a very wide, flattened head, although Sladenia has a more rounded head, with well developed teeth. The lower jaw has a fringe of small flaps along its edge and these extend along the head onto the flanks. The second dorsal fin is supported by between 8 and 12 soft rays while the anal fin contains between 6 and 10 soft rays. Most taxa have 18 or 19 vertebrae, but in Lophius this count is between 26 and 31. The opening to the gills is located to the rear of the pectoral fin base. The largest species in the family is the angler (Lophius piscatorius) which has a maximum published standard length of 200 cm (79 in) while the smallest is Lophiodes fimbriatus with a maximum published standard length of 7.5 cm (3.0 in).

== Distribution ==
The goosefishes, family Lophiidae are found in the temperate, tropical, and subtropical Atlantic Indian and Pacific Oceans.

== Habitat and biology ==
The goosefishes are typically found on soft substrates on the continental margin, most frequently at depths greater than 200 m (660 ft), and there are species which have been found at depths greater than 1,000 m (3,300 ft). A few species, such as the American angler (Lophius americanus) are found in shallower waters, sometimes moving into bays and estuaries with high-salinity water in the winter. At least in the genus Lophius the females release their spawn enclosed in a gelatinous mass, which has been compared to the spawn of toads in appearance, which floats. They have pelagic eggs and larvae with demersal juveniles and benthic adults.

== Utilisation ==
Goosefishes, particularly several of the large species in the genus Lophius, commonly known as monkfishes in northern Europe, are important commercially fished species. The liver of monkfish, known as ankimo, is considered a delicacy in Japan.
