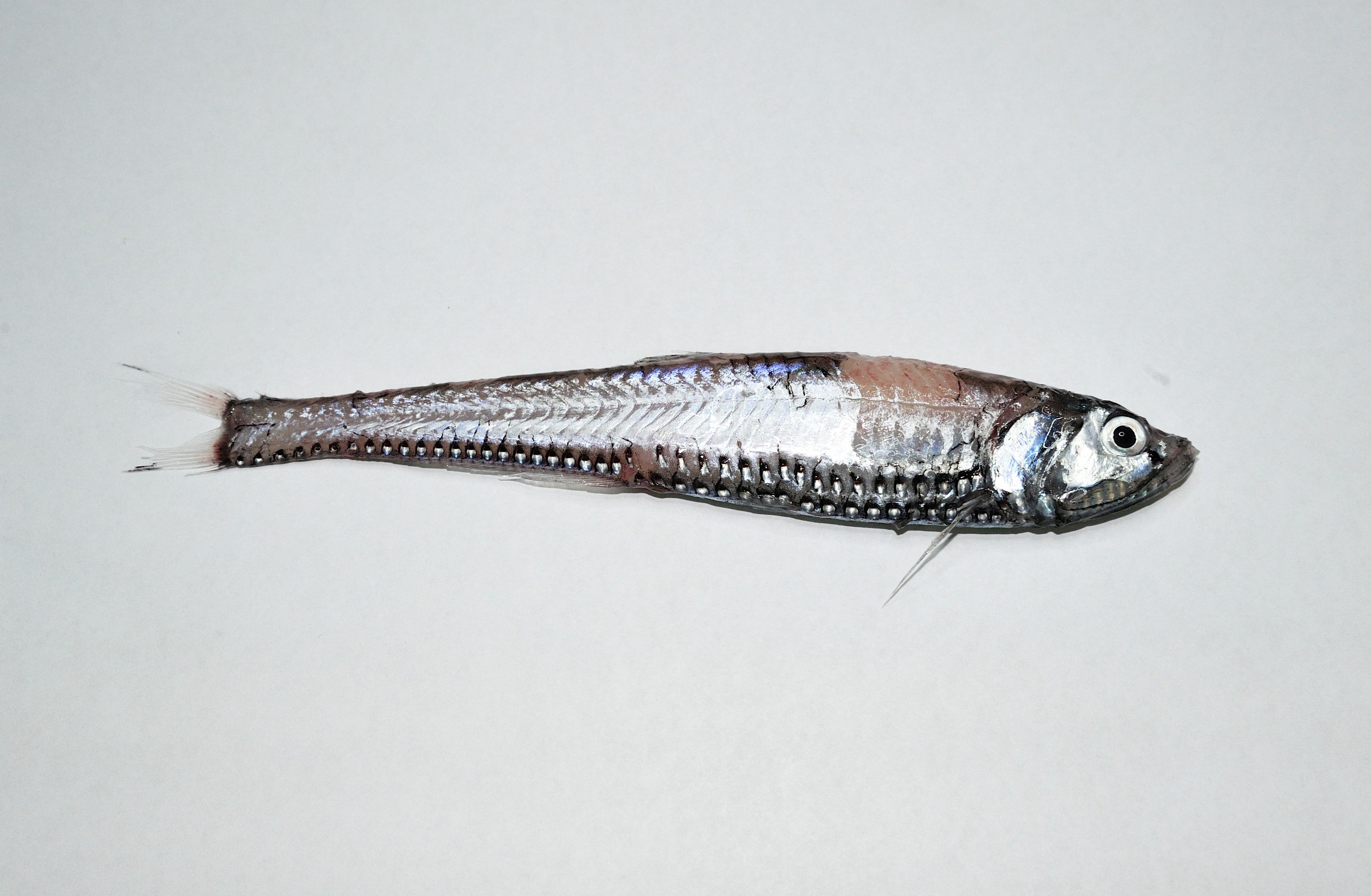

Conservation status
- Least Concern (IUCN 3.1)

Scientific classification
- Kingdom: Animalia
- Phylum: Chordata
- Class: Actinopterygii
- Order: Stomiiformes
- Family: Yarrellidae
- Genus: Polymetme
- Species: P. thaeocoryla

Binomial name
- Polymetme thaeocoryla (Parin & Borodulina, 1990)

= Polymetme thaeocoryla =

Species of fish

Polymetme thaeocoryla is a species of fish in the family Phosichthyidae (lightfish).

Its specific name is an anagram of the similar species, Polymetme corythaeola. It has no common name in English, but in Spanish is called luciérnaga musculosa ("muscular lightfish") and in French luisant grand feu ("gleaming [fish of] great fire").

== Description ==
Polymetme thaeocoryla has a dark dorsum, with silver flanks and a black pigment on the outer caudal rays. Its length is maximum 21.6 cm (8.5 in). It has 12 or 13 dorsal soft rays, 30–34 anal soft rays, 44 or 45 vertebrae, 7 or 8 pyloric caeca and 17–19 photophores above the anal fin.

== Habitat ==
Polymetme thaeocoryla is benthopelagic, living in the Atlantic Ocean at depths of 213–1,400 m (699–4,593 ft).

== Behaviour ==
Nothing is known of its early life stages.
