= Polyipnus elongatus =

Conservation status
- Least Concern (IUCN 3.1)

Scientific classification
- Kingdom: Animalia
- Phylum: Chordata
- Class: Actinopterygii
- Order: Stomiiformes
- Family: Sternoptychidae
- Genus: Polyipnus
- Species: P. elongatus

Binomial name
- Polyipnus elongatus Borodulina, 1979

Species of fish

Polyipnus elongatus is a species of ray-finned fish in the family Sternoptychidae. It can be found in deep water in the southwestern Pacific Ocean around Australia, at depths down to about 400 metres (1,300 ft).

== Status ==
Polyipnus elongatus is a common benthopelagic species within its known range, where it is likely to be restricted by lack of data, and faces no particular threats. For these reasons, the International Union for Conservation of Nature has assessed its conservation status as being of "least concern".
