= Polyipnus clarus =

Conservation status
- Least Concern (IUCN 3.1)

Scientific classification
- Kingdom: Animalia
- Phylum: Chordata
- Class: Actinopterygii
- Order: Stomiiformes
- Family: Sternoptychidae
- Genus: Polyipnus
- Species: P. clarus

Binomial name
- Polyipnus clarus Harold, 1994

Species of fish

Polyipnus clarus, commonly known as the stareye hatchetfish or slope hatchetfish, is a species of ray-finned fish in the family Sternoptychidae. It occurs in deep water in the western Atlantic Ocean from the Gulf of Maine southward to the Caribbean Sea and the Gulf of Mexico. It most commonly occurs between 300 and 400 metres (1,000 and 1,300 ft) but can range from 40 and 830 metres (100 and 2,700 ft).

== Description ==
Polyipnus clarus is a short, deep-bodied fish with a laterally compressed body and a maximum length of about 56 mm (2.2 in). The mouth is nearly vertical, the snout is short and the eyes are large, laterally-facing and non-tubular. The dorsal surface is dark with a triangular bar and the flanks silvery. There are photophores behind and below the eye, on the flanks and belly.

== Status ==
Polyipnus clarus is a common mesopelagic, demersal, shoaling species and faces no particular threats. For these reasons, the International Union for Conservation of Nature has assessed its conservation status as being of "least concern".
