= Polyipnus indicus =

Scientific classification
- Kingdom: Animalia
- Phylum: Chordata
- Class: Actinopterygii
- Order: Stomiiformes
- Family: Sternoptychidae
- Genus: Polyipnus
- Species: P. indicus

Binomial name
- Polyipnus indicus Schultz, 1961

Species of fish

Polyipnus indicus is a species of ray-finned fish in the genus Polyipnus. It is found in the Western Indian Ocean. It has a depth range of 50–500 metres (160–1,640 ft).
