= Polyipnus fraseri =

Scientific classification
- Kingdom: Animalia
- Phylum: Chordata
- Class: Actinopterygii
- Order: Stomiiformes
- Family: Sternoptychidae
- Genus: Polyipnus
- Species: P. fraseri

Binomial name
- Polyipnus fraseri Fowler, 1934

Species of ray-finned fish

Polyipnus fraseri is a species of ray-finned fish in the genus Polyipnus. It is found in the Western Pacific Ocean.
