= Polyipnus aquavitus =

Scientific classification
- Domain: Eukaryota
- Kingdom: Animalia
- Phylum: Chordata
- Class: Actinopterygii
- Order: Stomiiformes
- Family: Sternoptychidae
- Genus: Polyipnus
- Species: P. aquavitus

Binomial name
- Polyipnus aquavitus Baird, 1971

Species of fish

Polypinus aquavitus, commonly known as the aquavit hatchetfish, is a species of ray-finned fish in the genus Polyipnus. It is found in the Western Pacific Ocean. It has a depth range of 120–1244 meters.
