= Maurolicus breviculus =

Conservation status
- Least Concern (IUCN 3.1)

Scientific classification
- Kingdom: Animalia
- Phylum: Chordata
- Class: Actinopterygii
- Order: Stomiiformes
- Family: Sternoptychidae
- Genus: Maurolicus
- Species: M. breviculus

Binomial name
- Maurolicus breviculus Parin & Kobyliansky, 1993

Species of fish

Maurolicus breviculus is a species of ray-finned fish in the genus Maurolicus. It lives in deep-water environments off the coast of Ecuador and the Galapagos Islands.
