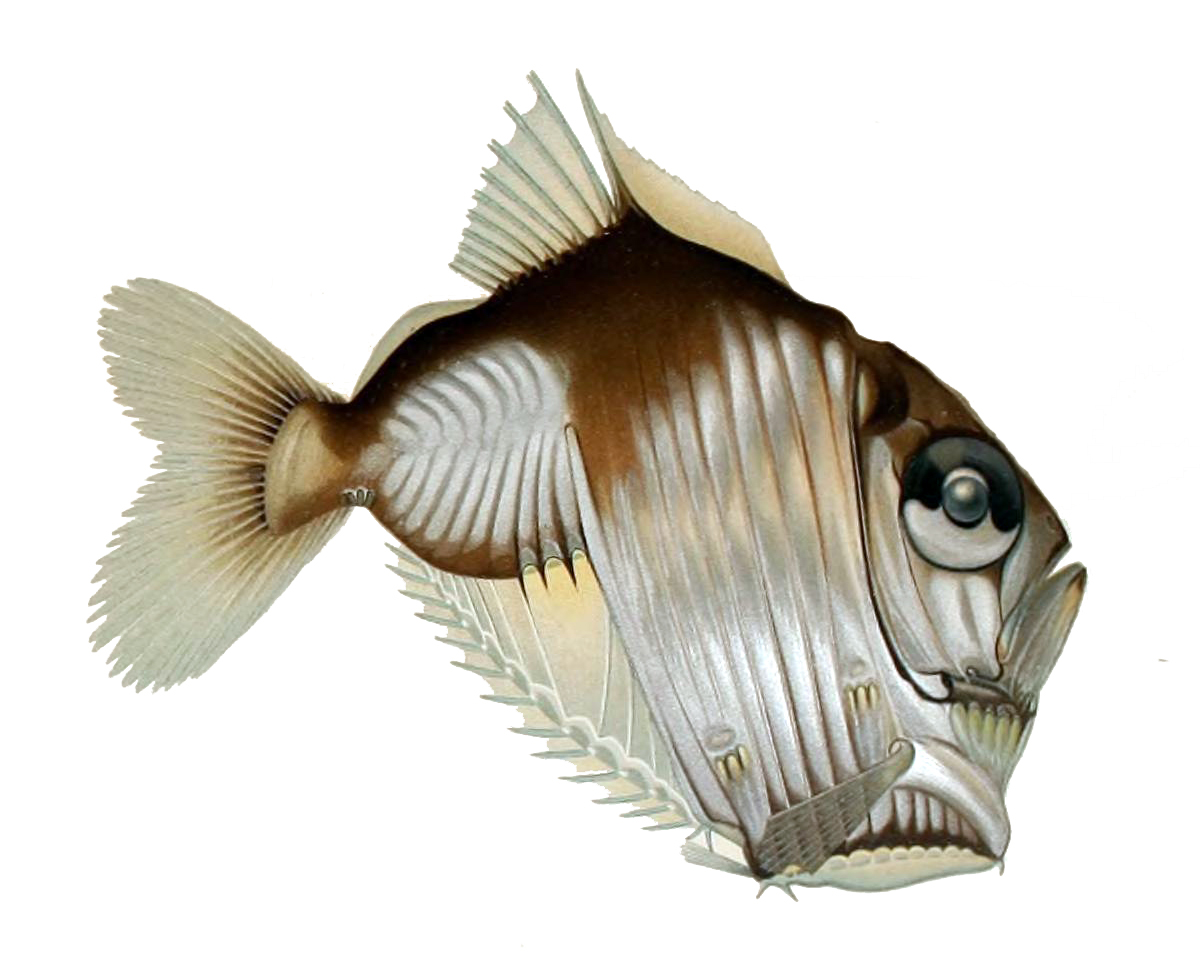
- Diaphanous hatchetfish

Conservation status
- Least Concern (IUCN 3.1)

Scientific classification
- Kingdom: Animalia
- Phylum: Chordata
- Class: Actinopterygii
- Order: Stomiiformes
- Family: Sternoptychidae
- Genus: Sternoptyx
- Species: S. diaphana

Binomial name
- Sternoptyx diaphana Hermann, 1781

= Sternoptyx diaphana =

Species of fish

Sternoptyx diaphana, the diaphanous hatchetfish, is a species of deep sea ray-finned fish in the family Sternoptychidae. It is the type species of the genus Sternoptyx, and was first described by the French naturalist Johann Hermann in Der Naturforscher 1781.

== Description ==
Sternoptyx diaphana is a short, deep-bodied fish with a laterally compressed body and a maximum length of about 45 mm (1.8 in). The mouth is nearly vertical, the snout is short and the eyes are large. The body slopes steeply up from the head and levels off at the caudal peduncle. In front of the dorsal fin is a toothed, pear-shaped translucent plate supported by a single spine. The dorsal fin has 9 to 12 soft rays and the anal fin 13 to 14. There is a translucent fold of skin just below the short tail, and another below the ventral region of the body. There are photophores behind and below the eye, on the gill cover, and rows of photophores on the underside of the fish. The dorsal region is dark, the flanks are silvery and the fins transparent.

== Distribution and habitat ==
Sternoptyx diaphana has a wide distribution in temperate and tropical waters of all the world's oceans, although occurring with less frequency in equatorial seas. Its depth range is 300 and 1,500 metres (1,000 and 5,000 ft), but it is most often found between about 600 and 900 metres (2,000 and 3,000 ft), where the water temperature is between 4 and 11 °C (39 and 52 °F). It appears not to make the daily vertical migrations made by some related species.

== Ecology ==
The diet consists of small fish, euphausiids, decapods, copepods and amphipods. Larger fish generally consume larger food items; the diet varies with location with the fish appearing to be opportunistic predators of whatever prey species they encounter.

== Status ==
Sternoptyx diaphana has a very wide distribution, is a common species and faces no particular threats. For these reasons, the International Union for Conservation of Nature has assessed its conservation status as being of "least concern".
