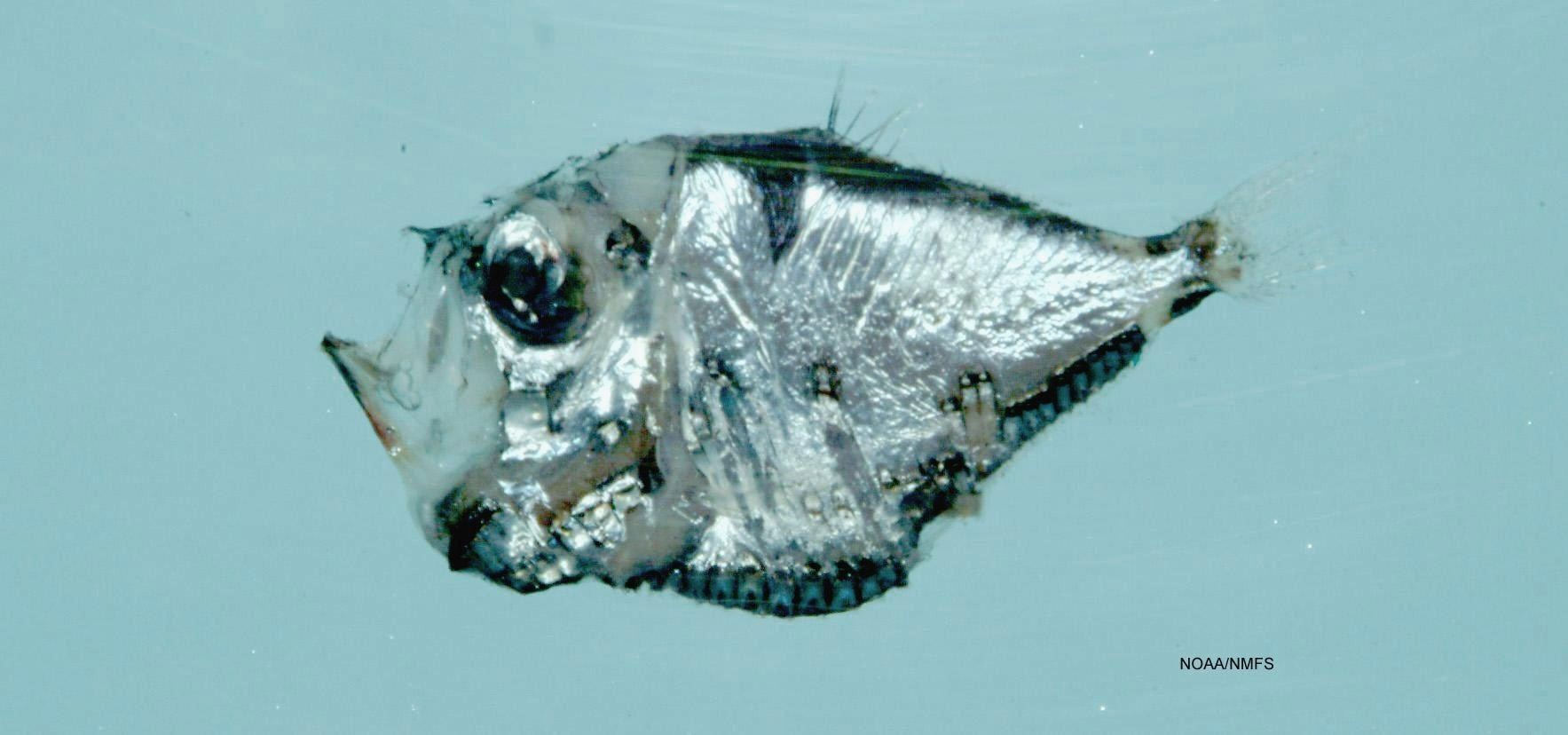

Conservation status
- Least Concern (IUCN 3.1)

Scientific classification
- Kingdom: Animalia
- Phylum: Chordata
- Class: Actinopterygii
- Order: Stomiiformes
- Family: Sternoptychidae
- Genus: Polyipnus
- Species: P. asteroides

Binomial name
- Polyipnus asteroides Schultz, 1938

= Polyipnus asteroides =

Species of fish

Polyipnus asteroides, commonly known as the shortspine tenplate, is a species of ray-finned fish in the family Sternoptychidae. It occurs in deep water in the western Atlantic Ocean from the Gulf of Maine southward to the Caribbean Sea and the Gulf of Mexico. It occurs to a depth of about 500 metres (1,600 ft).
