= Maurolicus javanicus =

Scientific classification
- Kingdom: Animalia
- Phylum: Chordata
- Class: Actinopterygii
- Order: Stomiiformes
- Family: Sternoptychidae
- Genus: Maurolicus
- Species: M. javanicus

Binomial name
- Maurolicus javanicus Parin & Kobyliansky, 1993

Species of fish

Maurolicus javanicus, also known as the Javan pearlside, is a species of ray-finned fish in the genus Maurolicus. It lives in deep water environments off Java, Australia, and Indonesia. It has 30-31 vertebrae.
