= Polyipnus spinifer =

Scientific classification
- Domain: Eukaryota
- Kingdom: Animalia
- Phylum: Chordata
- Class: Actinopterygii
- Order: Stomiiformes
- Family: Sternoptychidae
- Genus: Polyipnus
- Species: P. spinifer

Binomial name
- Polyipnus spinifer Borodulina, 1979

Species of fish

Polyipnus spinifer is a species of ray-finned fish in the genus Polyipnus. It lives in deep water environments in the Western Pacific Ocean.
