= Polyipnus laternatus =

Scientific classification
- Kingdom: Animalia
- Phylum: Chordata
- Class: Actinopterygii
- Order: Stomiiformes
- Family: Sternoptychidae
- Genus: Polyipnus
- Species: P. laternatus

Binomial name
- Polyipnus laternatus Garman, 1899

Species of ray-finned fish

Polyipnus laternatus is a species of ray-finned fish in the genus Polyipnus. It is found throughout the Caribbean Sea and the Gulf of Mexico in waters from 370 - 500 meters.
