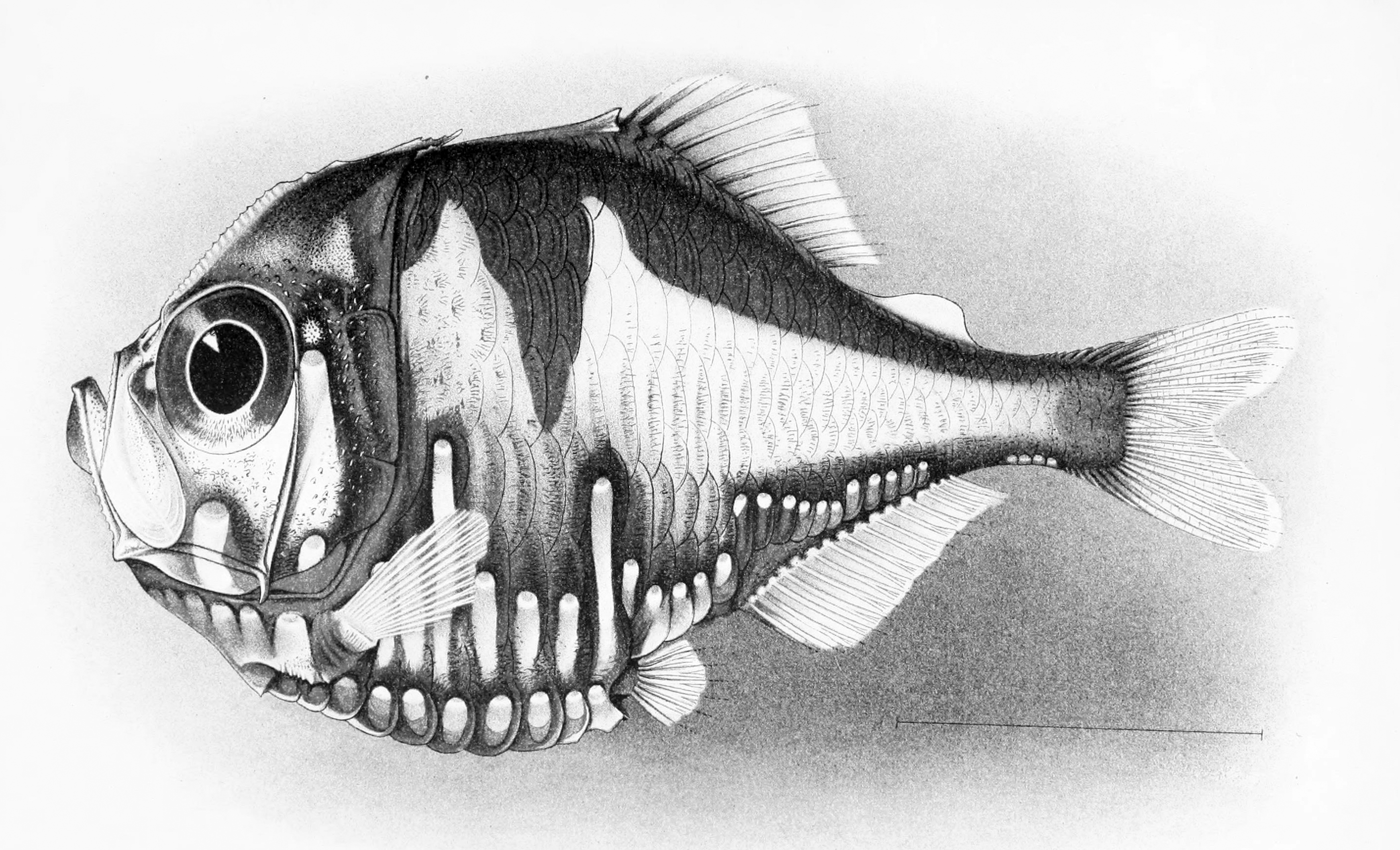

Scientific classification
- Kingdom: Animalia
- Phylum: Chordata
- Class: Actinopterygii
- Order: Stomiiformes
- Family: Sternoptychidae
- Genus: Polyipnus
- Species: P. nuttingi

Binomial name
- Polyipnus nuttingi Gilbert, 1905

= Polyipnus nuttingi =

Species of fish

Polyipnus nuttingi, commonly known as Nutting's hatchet fish, is a species of ray-finned fish in the family Sternoptychidae. It occurs in deep water in the Indo-Pacific Ocean, at depths between about 384 and 658 metres (1,300 and 2,200 ft).
