= Maurolicus imperatorius =

Scientific classification
- Kingdom: Animalia
- Phylum: Chordata
- Class: Actinopterygii
- Order: Stomiiformes
- Family: Sternoptychidae
- Genus: Maurolicus
- Species: M. imperatorius

Binomial name
- Maurolicus imperatorius Parin & Kobyliansky, 1993

Species of fish

Maurolicus imperatorius, commonly knowns as the Emperor seamount lightfish, is a species of ray-finned fish in the genus Maurolicus. It lives in the North Pacific.
