= Polyipnus unispinus =

Scientific classification
- Kingdom: Animalia
- Phylum: Chordata
- Class: Actinopterygii
- Order: Stomiiformes
- Family: Sternoptychidae
- Genus: Polyipnus
- Species: P. unispinus

Binomial name
- Polyipnus unispinus Schultz, 1938

Species of fish

Polyipnus unispinus is a species of ray-finned fish in the genus Polyipnus. It lives in deep water environments in the Western Pacific Ocean.
