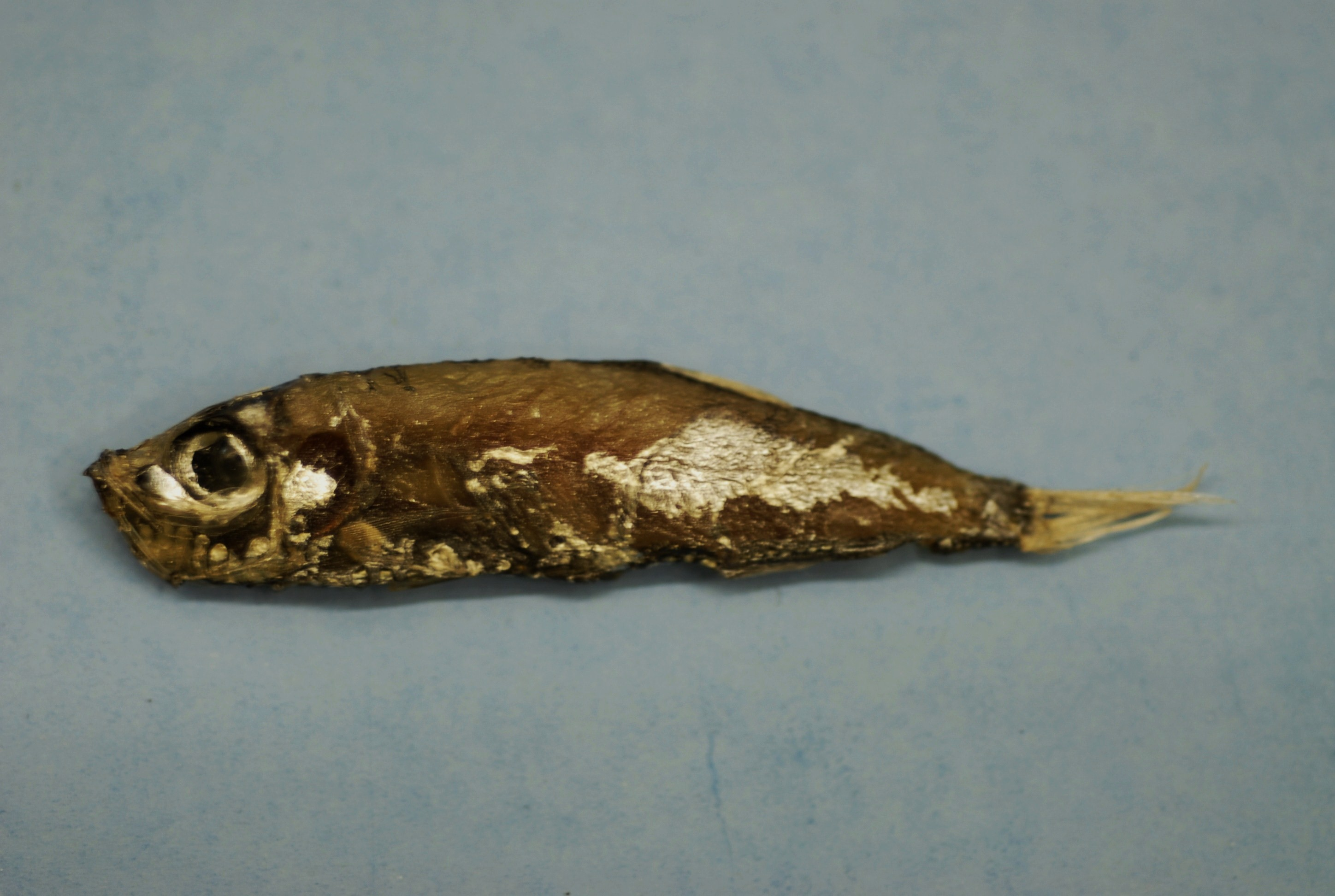

Scientific classification
- Kingdom: Animalia
- Phylum: Chordata
- Class: Actinopterygii
- Order: Stomiiformes
- Family: Sternoptychidae
- Genus: Maurolicus
- Species: M. weitzmani

Binomial name
- Maurolicus weitzmani Parin & Kobyliansky, 1993

= Maurolicus weitzmani =

Species of ray-finned fish

Maurolicus weitzmani, commonly known as the Atlantic pearlside, is a species of ray-finned fish in the genus Maurolicus. It lives in the Atlantic Ocean.
