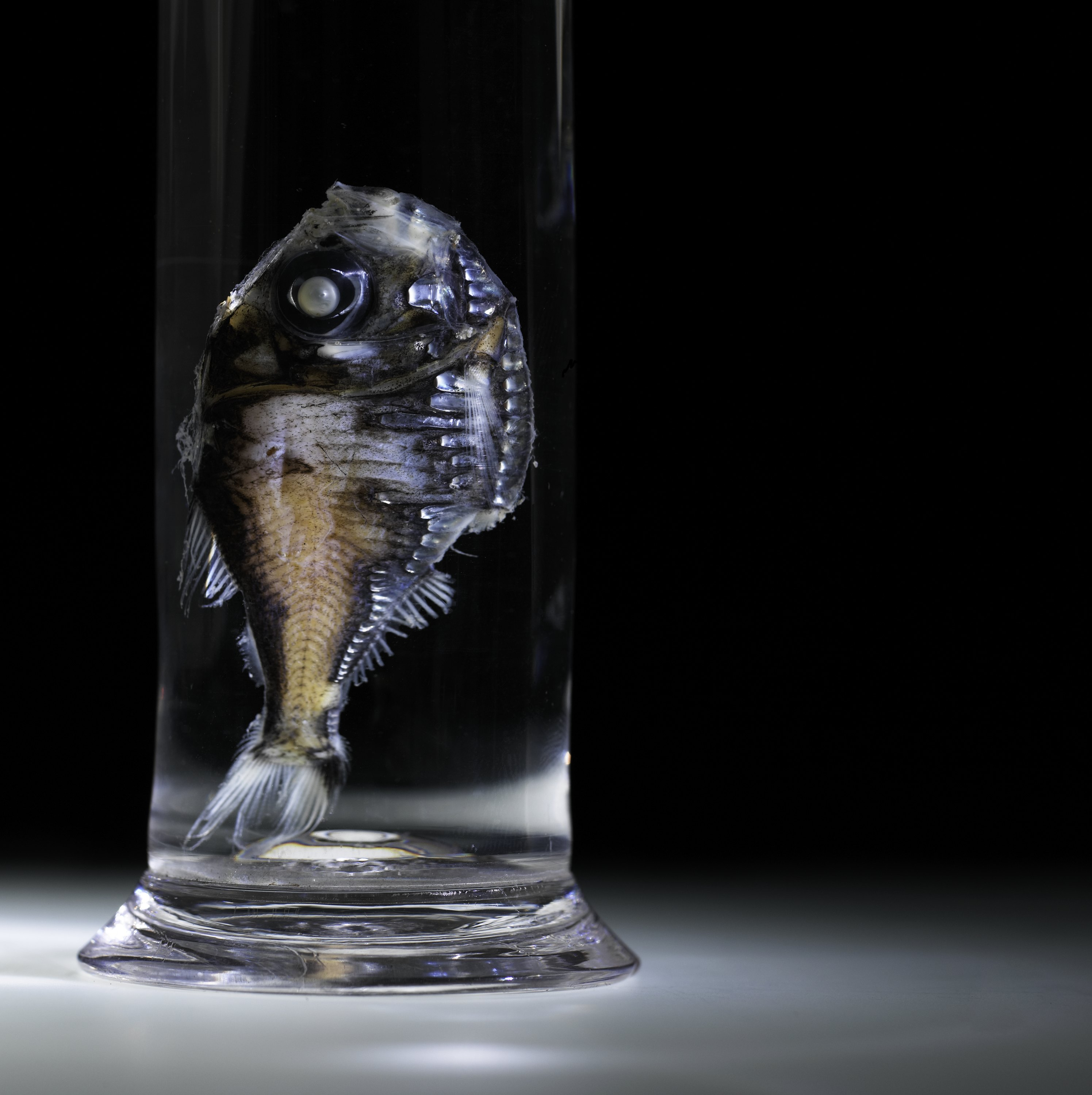
- A preserved kiwi hatchetfish (Polyipnus kiwiensis), collected during the NORFANZ Expedition.

Scientific classification
- Kingdom: Animalia
- Phylum: Chordata
- Class: Actinopterygii
- Order: Stomiiformes
- Family: Sternoptychidae
- Genus: Polyipnus
- Species: P. kiwiensis

Binomial name
- Polyipnus kiwiensis Baird, 1971

= Polyipnus kiwiensis =

Species of fish

Polyipnus kiwiensis, commonly known as the kiwi hatchetfish, is a species of ray-finned fish in the genus Polyipnus. It is found in the Tasman Sea off Australia and New Zealand. The kiwi hatchetfish is carnivores.
