= Polyipnus polli =

Conservation status
- Least Concern (IUCN 3.1)

Scientific classification
- Kingdom: Animalia
- Phylum: Chordata
- Class: Actinopterygii
- Order: Stomiiformes
- Family: Sternoptychidae
- Genus: Polyipnus
- Species: P. polli

Binomial name
- Polyipnus polli L. P. Schultz, 1961

Species of fish

Polyipnus polli, commonly known as the round hatchetfish, is a species of ray-finned fish in the family Sternoptychidae. It occurs in deep water in the eastern Atlantic Ocean, at depths between about 250 and 600 metres (800 and 2,000 ft).

== Etymology ==
The fish is named in honor of Max Poll (1908-1991), a Belgian ichthyologist, who loaned specimens of this species to Schultz.

== Status ==
Polyipnus polli is a common species within its known range and faces no particular threats. For these reasons, the International Union for Conservation of Nature has assessed its conservation status as being of "least concern".
