= Polyipnus asper =

Scientific classification
- Domain: Eukaryota
- Kingdom: Animalia
- Phylum: Chordata
- Class: Actinopterygii
- Order: Stomiiformes
- Family: Sternoptychidae
- Genus: Polyipnus
- Species: P. asper

Binomial name
- Polyipnus asper Harold, 1994

Species of ray-finned fish

Polyipnus asper is a species of ray-finned fish in the genus Polyipnus. It is found in the Eastern Indian Ocean in shallow waters from 0 - 384 meters.
