= Polyipnus ovatus =

Scientific classification
- Domain: Eukaryota
- Kingdom: Animalia
- Phylum: Chordata
- Class: Actinopterygii
- Order: Stomiiformes
- Family: Sternoptychidae
- Genus: Polyipnus
- Species: P. ovatus

Binomial name
- Polyipnus ovatus Harold, 1994

Species of ray-finned fish

Polyipnus ovatus is a species of ray-finned fish in the genus Polyipnus. It is found in the South China Sea, Celebes Sea, and Java Sea with a depth range of 194 - 209 m.
