= Polyipnus inermis =

Scientific classification
- Domain: Eukaryota
- Kingdom: Animalia
- Phylum: Chordata
- Class: Actinopterygii
- Order: Stomiiformes
- Family: Sternoptychidae
- Genus: Polyipnus
- Species: P. inermis

Binomial name
- Polyipnus inermis Borodulina, 1981

Species of fish

Polyipnus inermis is a species of ray-finned fish in the genus Polyipnus. It is found in the Southeast Pacific. It has a depth range of 0 - 575 m.
