= Araiophos eastropas =

Scientific classification
- Domain: Eukaryota
- Kingdom: Animalia
- Phylum: Chordata
- Class: Actinopterygii
- Order: Stomiiformes
- Family: Sternoptychidae
- Genus: Araiophos
- Species: A. eastropas

Binomial name
- Araiophos eastropas Ahlstrom & Moser, 1969

Species of fish

Araiophos eastropas is a species of ray-finned fish in the genus Araiophos. It lives in the Western Central Pacific.
