= Maurolicus walvisensis =

Scientific classification
- Kingdom: Animalia
- Phylum: Chordata
- Class: Actinopterygii
- Order: Stomiiformes
- Family: Sternoptychidae
- Genus: Maurolicus
- Species: M. walvisensis

Binomial name
- Maurolicus walvisensis Parin & Kobyliansky, 1993

Species of fish

Maurolicus walvisensis is a species of ray-finned fish in the genus Maurolicus. It lives in the Southeast Atlantic and Western Indian Ocean.
