= Polyipnus meteori =

Scientific classification
- Domain: Eukaryota
- Kingdom: Animalia
- Phylum: Chordata
- Class: Actinopterygii
- Order: Stomiiformes
- Family: Sternoptychidae
- Genus: Polyipnus
- Species: P. meteori

Binomial name
- Polyipnus meteori Kotthaus, 1967

Species of ray-finned fish

Polyipnus meteori is a species of ray-finned fish in the genus Polyipnus found in the Indian and Pacific Oceans.
