= Polyipnus parini =

Scientific classification
- Domain: Eukaryota
- Kingdom: Animalia
- Phylum: Chordata
- Class: Actinopterygii
- Order: Stomiiformes
- Family: Sternoptychidae
- Genus: Polyipnus
- Species: P. parini

Binomial name
- Polyipnus parini Borodulina, 1979

Species of ray-finned fish

Polyipnus parini is a species of ray-finned fish in the genus Polyipnus found in the Western Pacific Ocean.
