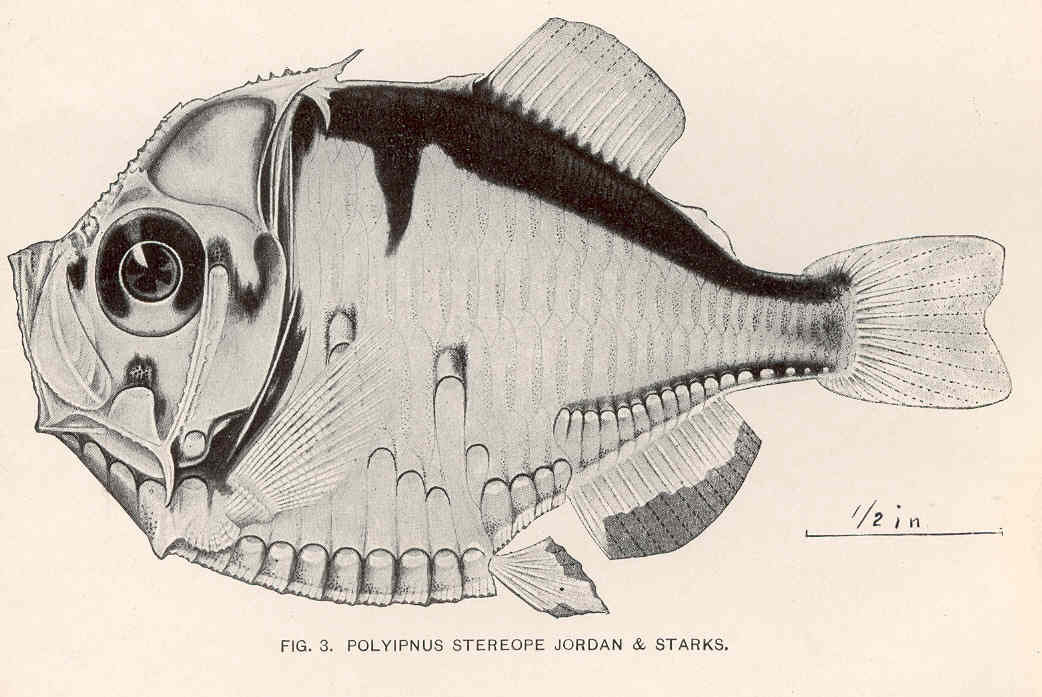

Scientific classification
- Kingdom: Animalia
- Phylum: Chordata
- Class: Actinopterygii
- Order: Stomiiformes
- Family: Sternoptychidae
- Genus: Polyipnus
- Species: P. stereope

Binomial name
- Polyipnus stereope Jordan & Starks, 1904

= Polyipnus stereope =

Species of fish

Polyipnus stereope is a species of ray-finned fish in the family Sternoptychidae. It occurs in deep water in the northwestern Pacific Ocean, at depths between about 150 and 280 metres (500 and 900 ft).
