= Maurolicus rudjakovi =

Scientific classification
- Kingdom: Animalia
- Phylum: Chordata
- Class: Actinopterygii
- Order: Stomiiformes
- Family: Sternoptychidae
- Genus: Maurolicus
- Species: M. rudjakovi

Binomial name
- Maurolicus rudjakovi Parin & Kobyliansky, 1993

Species of fish

Maurolicus rudjakovi is a species of ray-finned fish in the genus Maurolicus. It lives in the Southeast Atlantic.
