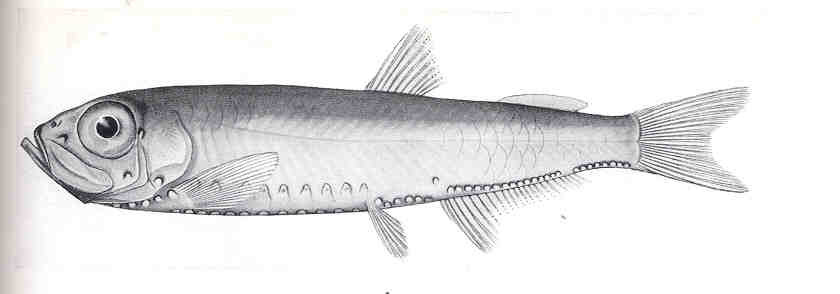

Conservation status
- Least Concern (IUCN 3.1)

Scientific classification
- Kingdom: Animalia
- Phylum: Chordata
- Class: Actinopterygii
- Order: Stomiiformes
- Family: Sternoptychidae
- Genus: Maurolicus
- Species: M. australis

Binomial name
- Maurolicus australis Hector, 1875

= Maurolicus australis =

Species of fish

Maurolicus australis, commonly known as the pennant pearlside, is a species of ray-finned fish in the genus Maurolicus. It lives in deep-water marine environments off New Zealand and Southern Australia. It has 33-34 vertebrae.
