= Valenciennellus tripunctulatus =

Conservation status
- Least Concern (IUCN 3.1)

Scientific classification
- Domain: Eukaryota
- Kingdom: Animalia
- Phylum: Chordata
- Class: Actinopterygii
- Order: Stomiiformes
- Family: Sternoptychidae
- Genus: Valenciennellus
- Species: V. tripunctulatus

Binomial name
- Valenciennellus tripunctulatus (Esmark, 1871)

Synonyms
- Maurolicus tripunctulatus Esmark, 1871; Valencienellus tripunctulatus Esmark, 1871; Valenciennellus stellatus Garman, 1899; Valenciennellus tripunctatus Esmark, 1871

Species of fish

Valenciennellus tripunctulatus, commonly called the constellationfish, is a species of fish in the family Sternoptychidae (hatchetfish).

== Description ==
Valenciennellus tripunctulatus is small, growing no longer than 3.1 cm (1.2 in). It darkens its body at night by pigment dispersion. It is silvery-white in colour with several black spots; the name tripunctulatus ("three-spotted") refers to the larger spots on their ventral surface, although there are often more than three of these.

== Habitat ==
Valenciennellus tripunctulatus lives all the world's non-polar oceans. It is bathypelagic and non-migratory, living at depths of 100–1,000 m (330–3,280 ft).

== Behaviour ==
Valenciennellus tripunctulatus is a selective daytime feeder on copepods (mainly Pleuromamma) and ostracods (such as Conchoecia).

It breeds year-round, with egg batches about 100–360 eggs per ovary pair, the number increasing with animal size. It does not guard its eggs.
