= Araiophos gracilis =

Scientific classification
- Domain: Eukaryota
- Kingdom: Animalia
- Phylum: Chordata
- Class: Actinopterygii
- Order: Stomiiformes
- Family: Sternoptychidae
- Genus: Araiophos
- Species: A. gracilis

Binomial name
- Araiophos gracilis M. G. Grey, 1961

Species of fish

Araiophos gracilis is a species of ray-finned fish in the genus Araiophos. It is found in the Pacific Ocean.
