= Polyipnus notatus =

Scientific classification
- Domain: Eukaryota
- Kingdom: Animalia
- Phylum: Chordata
- Class: Actinopterygii
- Order: Stomiiformes
- Family: Sternoptychidae
- Genus: Polyipnus
- Species: P. notatus

Binomial name
- Polyipnus notatus Harold, I. M. Kemp & Shore, 2016

Species of ray-finned fish

Polyipnus notatus is a species of ray-finned fish in the genus Polyipnus found the South China Sea.
