= Polyipnus paxtoni =

Scientific classification
- Kingdom: Animalia
- Phylum: Chordata
- Class: Actinopterygii
- Order: Stomiiformes
- Family: Sternoptychidae
- Genus: Polyipnus
- Species: P. paxtoni

Binomial name
- Polyipnus paxtoni Harold, 1989

Species of ray-finned fish

Polyipnus paxtoni is a species of ray-finned fish in the genus Polyipnus found in the Western Central Pacific between depths of 0 and 300 meters.

== Etymology ==
The fish is named in honor of American-born Australian ichthyologist John R. Paxton of the Australian Museum in Sydney, because of his contributions to the study of oceanic fishes, and for providing the collections of this particular species.
