= Polyipnus limatulus =

Scientific classification
- Domain: Eukaryota
- Kingdom: Animalia
- Phylum: Chordata
- Class: Actinopterygii
- Order: Stomiiformes
- Family: Sternoptychidae
- Genus: Polyipnus
- Species: P. limatulus

Binomial name
- Polyipnus limatulus Harold & Wessel, 1998

Species of ray-finned fish

Polyipnus limatulus is a species of ray-finned fish in the genus Polyipnus. It is found in the Western Indian Ocean.
