= Polyipnus bruuni =

Scientific classification
- Domain: Eukaryota
- Kingdom: Animalia
- Phylum: Chordata
- Class: Actinopterygii
- Order: Stomiiformes
- Family: Sternoptychidae
- Genus: Polyipnus
- Species: P. bruuni

Binomial name
- Polyipnus bruuni Harold, 1994

Species of ray-finned fish

Polyipnus bruuni is a species of ray-finned fish in the genus Polyipnus. It is found in the Western Indian Ocean off Kenya in shallow waters from 0 - 240 meters.
