= Polyipnus matsubarai =

Scientific classification
- Kingdom: Animalia
- Phylum: Chordata
- Class: Actinopterygii
- Order: Stomiiformes
- Family: Sternoptychidae
- Genus: Polyipnus
- Species: P. matsubarai

Binomial name
- Polyipnus matsubarai Schultz, 1961

Species of fish

Polyipnus matsubarai is a species of ray-finned fish in the genus Polyipnus. Its standard length is 9.7 cm and lives at a depth of 240 metres. They inhabit the waters around Japan, the Philippine Sea, and Hawaiian-Emperor Seamounts.
