= Maurolicus japonicus =

Scientific classification
- Domain: Eukaryota
- Kingdom: Animalia
- Phylum: Chordata
- Class: Actinopterygii
- Order: Stomiiformes
- Family: Sternoptychidae
- Genus: Maurolicus
- Species: M. japonicus

Binomial name
- Maurolicus japonicus Ishikawa, 1915

Species of fish

Maurolicus japonicus, commonly known as the North Pacific lightfish, is a species of ray-finned fish in the genus Maurolicus. It is found the North Pacific.
