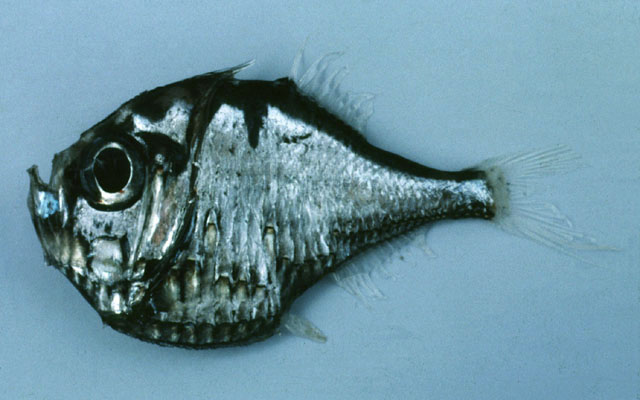

Scientific classification
- Kingdom: Animalia
- Phylum: Chordata
- Class: Actinopterygii
- Order: Stomiiformes
- Family: Sternoptychidae
- Genus: Polyipnus
- Species: P. triphanos

Binomial name
- Polyipnus triphanos Schultz, 1938

= Polyipnus triphanos =

Species of fish

Polyipnus triphanos, commonly known as the threelight hatchetfish, is a species of ray-finned fish in the family Sternoptychidae. It occurs in deep water in the Indo-Pacific Ocean, at depths between about 322 and 966 metres (1,100 and 3,200 ft).
