= Maurolicus parvipinnis =

Scientific classification
- Domain: Eukaryota
- Kingdom: Animalia
- Phylum: Chordata
- Class: Actinopterygii
- Order: Stomiiformes
- Family: Sternoptychidae
- Genus: Maurolicus
- Species: M. parvipinnis

Binomial name
- Maurolicus parvipinnis Vailllant, 1888

Species of fish

Maurolicus parvipinnis is a species of ray-finned fish in the genus Maurolicus. It is found in the Southeast Pacific off the coast of South America.
