= Polyipnus surugaensis =

Scientific classification
- Domain: Eukaryota
- Kingdom: Animalia
- Phylum: Chordata
- Class: Actinopterygii
- Order: Stomiiformes
- Family: Sternoptychidae
- Genus: Polyipnus
- Species: P. surugaensis

Binomial name
- Polyipnus surugaensis Aizawa, 1990

Species of fish

Polyipnus surugaensis is a species of ray-finned fish in the genus Polyipnus. It lives in deep water environments in Suruga Bay.
