= Polyipnus soelae =

Scientific classification
- Domain: Eukaryota
- Kingdom: Animalia
- Phylum: Chordata
- Class: Actinopterygii
- Order: Stomiiformes
- Family: Sternoptychidae
- Genus: Polyipnus
- Species: P. soelae

Binomial name
- Polyipnus soelae Harold, 1994

Species of ray-finned fish

Polyipnus soelae, commonly known as the soela hatchetfish, is a species of ray-finned fish in the genus Polyipnus. It is found in Indonesia with a depth range of 300 - 520 m.
