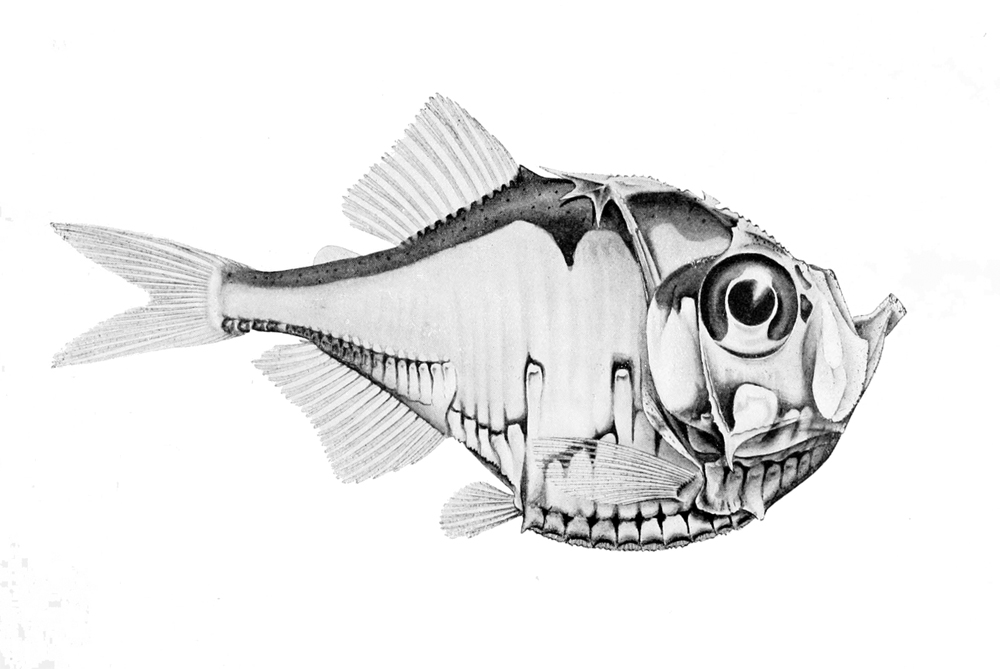

Scientific classification
- Kingdom: Animalia
- Phylum: Chordata
- Class: Actinopterygii
- Order: Stomiiformes
- Family: Sternoptychidae
- Genus: Polyipnus
- Species: P. tridentifer

Binomial name
- Polyipnus tridentifer McCulloch, 1914

= Polyipnus tridentifer =

Species of fish

Polyipnus tridentifer, commonly known as the three-spined hatchetfish, is a species of ray-finned fish in the family Sternoptychidae. It occurs in deep water in the Indo-Pacific Ocean, at depths between about 640 and 825 metres (2,100 and 2,700 ft).
