= Polyipnus oluolus =

Scientific classification
- Domain: Eukaryota
- Kingdom: Animalia
- Phylum: Chordata
- Class: Actinopterygii
- Order: Stomiiformes
- Family: Sternoptychidae
- Genus: Polyipnus
- Species: P. oluolus

Binomial name
- Polyipnus oluolus R. C. Baird, 1971

Species of ray-finned fish

Polyipnus oluolus is a species of ray-finned fish in the genus Polyipnus. It is found in the Marshall Islands.
