= Polyipnus latirastrus =

Scientific classification
- Kingdom: Animalia
- Phylum: Chordata
- Class: Actinopterygii
- Order: Stomiiformes
- Family: Sternoptychidae
- Genus: Polyipnus
- Species: P. latirastrus

Binomial name
- Polyipnus latirastrus Last & Harold, 1994

Species of fish

Polyipnus latirastrus, commonly known as the combside hatchetfish, is a species of ray-finned fish in the family Sternoptychidae. It occurs in deep water in the western Pacific Ocean, at depths between about 696 and 888 metres (2,300 and 2,900 ft).
