= Maurolicus mucronatus =

Scientific classification
- Kingdom: Animalia
- Phylum: Chordata
- Class: Actinopterygii
- Order: Stomiiformes
- Family: Sternoptychidae
- Genus: Maurolicus
- Species: M. mucronatus

Binomial name
- Maurolicus mucronatus Klunzinger, 1871

Species of fish

Maurolicus mucronatus is a species of ray-finned fish in the genus Maurolicus. It is found in the Western Indian Ocean.
