= Photonectes waitti =

Conservation status
- Least Concern (IUCN 3.1)

Scientific classification
- Kingdom: Animalia
- Phylum: Chordata
- Class: Actinopterygii
- Order: Stomiiformes
- Family: Stomiidae
- Genus: Photonectes
- Species: P. waitti

Binomial name
- Photonectes waitti Flynn & Klepadlo, 2012

Species of fish

Photonectes waitti is a species of deep-sea fish in the genus Photonectes. The species has been documented in the Pacific Ocean, and adults can reach a maximum length of 7.4 centimeters.

== Etymology ==
The fish is named in honor of American businessman and philanthropist Theodore (Ted) Waitt.
