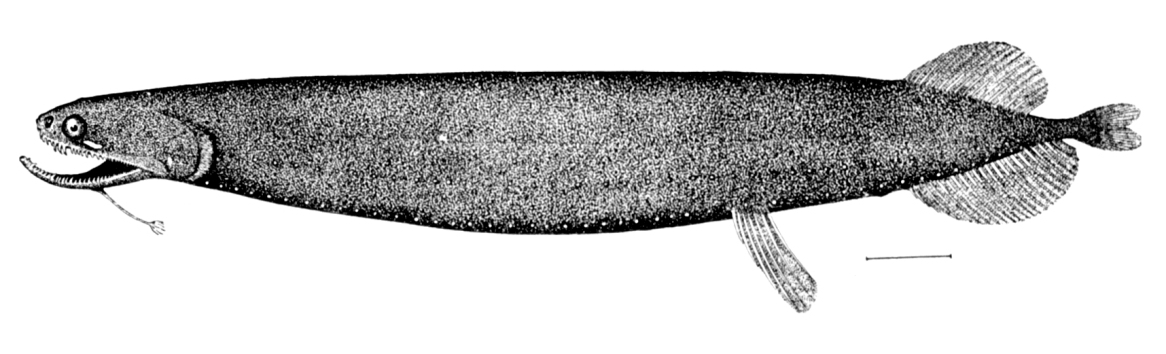

Conservation status
- Least Concern (IUCN 3.1)

Scientific classification
- Kingdom: Animalia
- Phylum: Chordata
- Class: Actinopterygii
- Order: Stomiiformes
- Family: Stomiidae
- Genus: Photonectes
- Species: P. margarita

Binomial name
- Photonectes margarita (Goode & Bean, 1896)

= Photonectes margarita =

Species of fish

Photonectes margarita is a species of deep-sea fish in the genus Photonectes. Members of the species are distributed worldwide, and typically inhabit waters at depth below 700 meters.
