= Leptostomias leptobolus =

Conservation status
- Least Concern (IUCN 3.1)

Scientific classification
- Kingdom: Animalia
- Phylum: Chordata
- Class: Actinopterygii
- Order: Stomiiformes
- Family: Stomiidae
- Genus: Leptostomias
- Species: L. leptobolus

Binomial name
- Leptostomias leptobolus Regan & Trewavas, 1930

Species of fish

Leptostomias leptobolus is a species of fish in the genus Leptostomias. The species has been documented in the Pacific Ocean, and fully-grown adults can reach a maximum length of ~11.5 centimetres (4.5 in).
