= Photonectes mirabilis =

Conservation status
- Least Concern (IUCN 3.1)

Scientific classification
- Domain: Eukaryota
- Kingdom: Animalia
- Phylum: Chordata
- Class: Actinopterygii
- Order: Stomiiformes
- Family: Stomiidae
- Genus: Photonectes
- Species: P. mirabilis

Binomial name
- Photonectes mirabilis Parr, 1927

Species of fish

Photonectes mirabilis is a species of deep-sea fish in the genus Photonectes. The species can be found in the Atlantic Ocean, and adults can reach a maximum length of 16.4 centimeters.
