= Photonectes cornutus =

Conservation status
- Data Deficient (IUCN 3.1)

Scientific classification
- Kingdom: Animalia
- Phylum: Chordata
- Class: Actinopterygii
- Order: Stomiiformes
- Family: Stomiidae
- Genus: Photonectes
- Species: P. cornutus

Binomial name
- Photonectes cornutus Beebe, 1933

Species of fish

Photonectes cornutus is a species of deep-sea fish in the genus Photonectes. The species can be found in the central Atlantic Ocean, and adults can reach a maximum size of about 1.9 cm (0.75 in).
