= Photonectes uncinatus =

Conservation status
- Data Deficient (IUCN 3.1)

Scientific classification
- Kingdom: Animalia
- Phylum: Chordata
- Class: Actinopterygii
- Order: Stomiiformes
- Family: Stomiidae
- Genus: Photonectes
- Species: P. uncinatus

Binomial name
- Photonectes uncinatus Prokofiev, 2015

Species of fish

Photonectes uncinatus is a species of fish in the genus Photonectes. The species has been documented in the Atlantic Ocean off the coast of Brazil, and adults can reach a maximum size of ~25 centimeters.
