= Araiophos =

Scientific classification
- Kingdom: Animalia
- Phylum: Chordata
- Class: Actinopterygii
- Order: Stomiiformes
- Family: Sternoptychidae
- Subfamily: Maurolicinae
- Genus: Araiophos; Grey, 1961

Type species
- Araiophos gracilis Grey, 1961

Genus of fishes

Araiophos is an oceanic ray-finned fish genus which belongs in the family Sternoptychidae.

== Species ==
There are currently two recognized species in this genus:

- Araiophos eastropas Ahlstrom & Moser, 1969
- Araiophos gracilis Grey, 1961
