= Leptostomias analis =

Conservation status
- Data Deficient (IUCN 3.1)

Scientific classification
- Kingdom: Animalia
- Phylum: Chordata
- Class: Actinopterygii
- Order: Stomiiformes
- Family: Stomiidae
- Genus: Leptostomias
- Species: L. analis

Binomial name
- Leptostomias analis Regan & Trewavas, 1930

Species of fish

Leptostomias analis is a species of deep-sea fish in the genus Leptostomias. The species has been documented in the Atlantic Ocean.
