= Photonectes munificus =

Conservation status
- Data Deficient (IUCN 3.1)

Scientific classification
- Kingdom: Animalia
- Phylum: Chordata
- Class: Actinopterygii
- Division: Teleostei
- Order: Stomiiformes
- Family: Stomiidae
- Genus: Photonectes
- Species: P. munificus

Binomial name
- Photonectes munificus Gibbs, 1968

Species of fish

Photonectes munificus is a species of fish in the family Stomiidae. The species is only known from its holotype, caught in the southeast Pacific Ocean off the coast of Chile, but outside Chilean EEZ. The holotype was taken at a depth between 0 and 440 m (0 and 1,444 ft).
