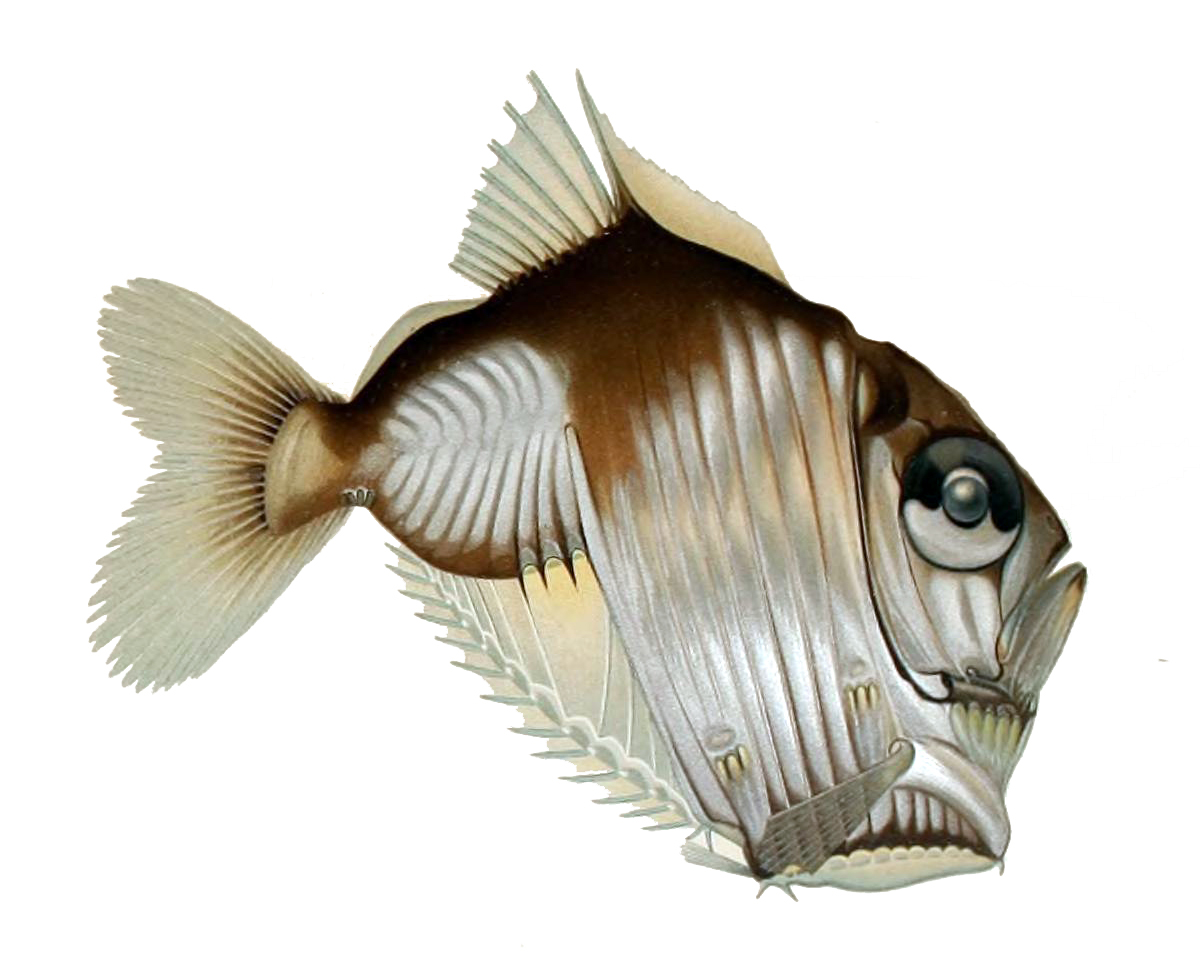
- Diaphanous hatchetfish (S. diaphana)

Scientific classification
- Kingdom: Animalia
- Phylum: Chordata
- Class: Actinopterygii
- Order: Stomiiformes
- Family: Sternoptychidae
- Subfamily: Sternoptychinae
- Genus: Sternoptyx; Hermann, 1781

= Sternoptyx =

Sternoptyx Temporal range: Early Oligocene to Present 40–0 Ma

Genus of fishes

Sternoptyx is an oceanic ray-finned fish genus which belongs in the family Sternoptychidae. This is the type genus of the Sternoptychidae, as well as the marine hatchetfish subfamily Sternoptychinae.

Sternoptyx have silvery, high, and laterally compressed bodies and large, non-telescopic eyes. They are all relatively small, with even the largest species (S. pseudobscura and S. pseudodiaphana) not exceeding 60 millimetres (2.4 in) standard length.

== Species ==
There are currently four recognized species in this genus:

- Sternoptyx diaphana Hermann, 1781 (Diaphanous hatchetfish)
- Sternoptyx obscura Garman, 1899
- Sternoptyx pseudobscura R. C. Baird, 1971 (Highlight hatchetfish)
- Sternoptyx pseudodiaphana Borodulina, 1977 (False oblique hatchetfish)

Fossils of this genus show that they have existed at least since the Early Oligocene, about 30 million years ago.
