= Photonectes litvinovi =

Conservation status
- Data Deficient (IUCN 3.1)

Scientific classification
- Kingdom: Animalia
- Phylum: Chordata
- Class: Actinopterygii
- Order: Stomiiformes
- Family: Stomiidae
- Genus: Photonectes
- Species: P. litvinovi

Binomial name
- Photonectes litvinovi Prokofiev, 2014

Species of fish

Photonectes litvinovi is a species of deep-sea fish in the genus Photonectes. The species has been documented in the Pacific Ocean, and adults can reach a maximum length of ~15 centimeters.
