= Sonoda (fish) =

Scientific classification
- Kingdom: Animalia
- Phylum: Chordata
- Class: Actinopterygii
- Order: Stomiiformes
- Family: Sternoptychidae
- Subfamily: Maurolicinae
- Genus: Sonoda; M. G. Grey, 1959

Type species
- Sonoda megalophthalma M.G. Grey, 1959

Genus of fishes

Sonoda is a genus of marine hatchetfishes found in the Atlantic Ocean.

== Species ==
There are currently two recognized species in this genus:

- Sonoda megalophthalma M.G. Grey, 1959
- Sonoda paucilampa M.G. Grey, 1960
