= Photonectes phyllopogon =

Conservation status
- Least Concern (IUCN 3.1)

Scientific classification
- Kingdom: Animalia
- Phylum: Chordata
- Class: Actinopterygii
- Order: Stomiiformes
- Family: Stomiidae
- Genus: Photonectes
- Species: P. phyllopogon

Binomial name
- Photonectes phyllopogon Regan & Trewavas, 1930

Species of fish

Photonectes phyllopogon is a species of fish in the genus Photonectes. The species is rarely seen, but has been documented in the Atlantic and Indian oceans. Adults can reach a maximum size of ~10 centimeters.
