= Photonectes dinema =

Conservation status
- Least Concern (IUCN 3.1)

Scientific classification
- Kingdom: Animalia
- Phylum: Chordata
- Class: Actinopterygii
- Order: Stomiiformes
- Family: Stomiidae
- Genus: Photonectes
- Species: P. dinema

Binomial name
- Photonectes dinema Regan & Trewavas, 1930

Species of fish

Photonectes dinema is a species of deep-sea fish in the genus Photonectes. The species has been observed in the Atlantic Ocean, and adults can reach a maximum length of ~25 centimeters.
