= Leptostomias gracilis =

Conservation status
- Least Concern (IUCN 3.1)

Scientific classification
- Kingdom: Animalia
- Phylum: Chordata
- Class: Actinopterygii
- Order: Stomiiformes
- Family: Stomiidae
- Genus: Leptostomias
- Species: L. gracilis

Binomial name
- Leptostomias gracilis Regan & Trewavas, 1930

Species of fish

Leptostomias gracilis is a species of fish in the genus Leptostomias. The species has been documented in the Atlantic and Pacific oceans, and fully-grown adults can reach a maximum length of ~38 centimetres (15 in).
