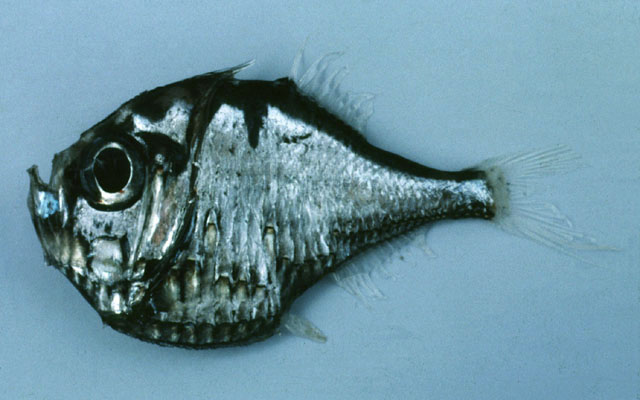
- Polyipnus triphanos

Scientific classification
- Kingdom: Animalia
- Phylum: Chordata
- Class: Actinopterygii
- Division: Teleostei
- Order: Stomiiformes
- Family: Sternoptychidae
- Subfamily: Sternoptychinae
- Genus: Polyipnus; Günther, 1887

= Polyipnus =

Polyipnus Temporal range: 33.9–0 Ma Early Oligocene to Present

Genus of fishes

Polyipnus is a genus of oceanic ray-finned fish in the family Sternoptychidae. This is the largest genus of the marine hatchetfishes subfamily Sternoptychinae and indeed of the entire Sternoptychidae. It is not quite as apomorphic as their relatives; it may be that the genus is actually a paraphyletic assemblage of less advanced Sternoptychinae and would need to be split.

Fossils of this genus show that they have existed at least since the Early Oligocene, about 30 million years ago.

== Species ==
There are currently 34 recognized species in this genus:

- Polyipnus aquavitus R. C. Baird, 1971 (aquavit hatchetfish)
- Polyipnus asper Harold, 1994
- Polyipnus asteroides L. P. Schultz, 1938
- Polyipnus bruuni Harold, 1994
- Polyipnus clarus Harold, 1994 (slope hatchetfish)
- Polyipnus danae Harold, 1990
- Polyipnus elongatus Borodulina, 1979
- Polyipnus fraseri Fowler, 1934
- Polyipnus indicus L. P. Schultz, 1961
- Polyipnus inermis Borodulina, 1981
- Polyipnus kiwiensis R. C. Baird, 1971 (kiwi hatchetfish)
- Polyipnus laruei Vourey, Dupoux & Harold, 2017 (bigeye hatchetfish)
- Polyipnus laternatus Garman, 1899
- Polyipnus latirastrus Last & Harold, 1994 (comb-side hatchetfish)
- Polyipnus limatulus Harold & Wessel, 1998
- Polyipnus matsubarai L. P. Schultz, 1961
- Polyipnus meteori Kotthaus, 1967
- Polyipnus notatus Harold, I. M. Kemp & Shore, 2016
- Polyipnus nuttingi C. H. Gilbert, 1905 (Nutting's hatchetfish)
- Polyipnus oluolus R. C. Baird, 1971
- Polyipnus omphus R. C. Baird, 1971
- Polyipnus ovatus Harold, 1994
- Polyipnus parini Borodulina, 1979
- Polyipnus paxtoni Harold, 1989 (Paxton's hatchetfish)
- Polyipnus polli L. P. Schultz, 1961 (round hatchetfish)
- Polyipnus ruggeri R. C. Baird, 1971 (rugby hatchetfish)
- Polyipnus soelae Harold, 1994 (Soela hatchetfish)
- Polyipnus spinifer Borodulina, 1979
- Polyipnus spinosus Günther, 1887 (spiny hatchetfish)
- Polyipnus stereope D. S. Jordan & Starks, 1904
- Polyipnus surugaensis Aizawa, 1990
- Polyipnus tridentifer McCulloch, 1914 (three-spined hatchetfish)
- Polyipnus triphanos L. P. Schultz, 1938 (three-light hatchetfish)
- Polyipnus unispinus L. P. Schultz, 1938
