= Photonectes barnetti =

Conservation status
- Data Deficient (IUCN 3.1)

Scientific classification
- Kingdom: Animalia
- Phylum: Chordata
- Class: Actinopterygii
- Order: Stomiiformes
- Family: Stomiidae
- Genus: Photonectes
- Species: P. barnetti

Binomial name
- Photonectes barnetti Klepadlo, 2011

Species of fish

Photonectes barnetti is a species of deep-sea fish in the genus Photonectes. The species is distributed across the Pacific Ocean, and adults can reach a maximum length of about 4.2 cm (1.7 in).
