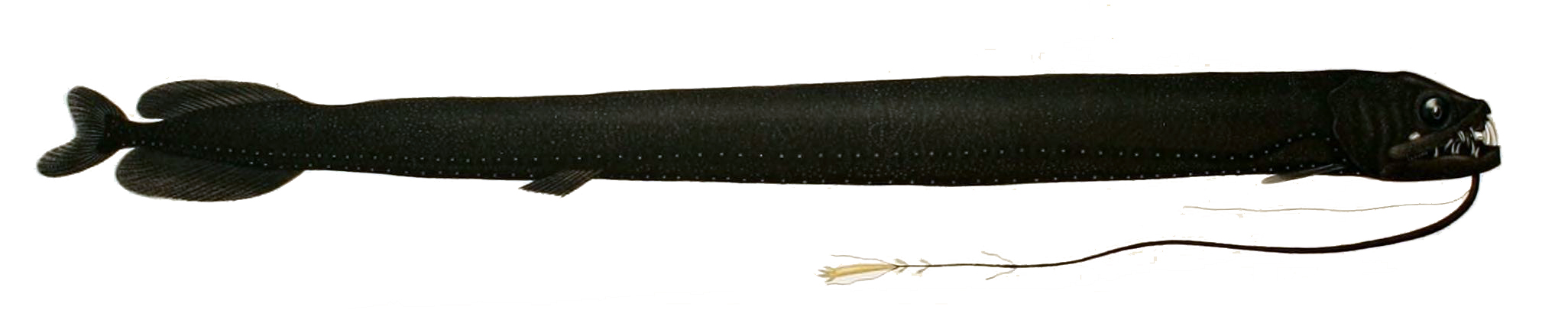

Scientific classification
- Kingdom: Animalia
- Phylum: Chordata
- Class: Actinopterygii
- Order: Stomiiformes
- Family: Stomiidae
- Subfamily: Melanostomiinae
- Genus: Leptostomias; C. H. Gilbert, 1905

= Leptostomias =

Genus of fishes

Leptostomias is a genus of barbeled dragonfishes.

== Species ==
There are currently 12 recognized species in this genus:

- Leptostomias analis Regan & Trewavas, 1930
- Leptostomias bermudensis Beebe, 1932
- Leptostomias bilobatus (Koefoed, 1956)
- Leptostomias gladiator (Zugmayer, 1911)
- Leptostomias gracilis Regan & Trewavas, 1930
- Leptostomias haplocaulus Regan & Trewavas, 1930
- Leptostomias leptobolus Regan & Trewavas, 1930
- Leptostomias longibarba Regan & Trewavas, 1930
- Leptostomias macronema C. H. Gilbert, 1905 (Long-threaded dragonfish)
- Leptostomias macropogon Norman, 1930
- Leptostomias multifilis S. Imai, 1941
- Leptostomias robustus S. Imai, 1941
