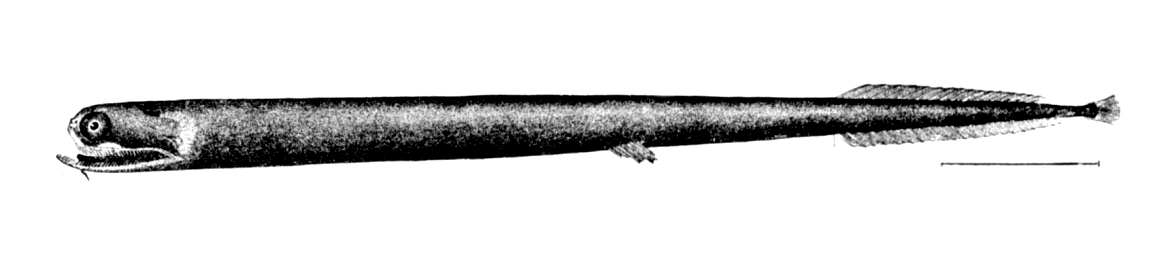
- Photonectes gracilis
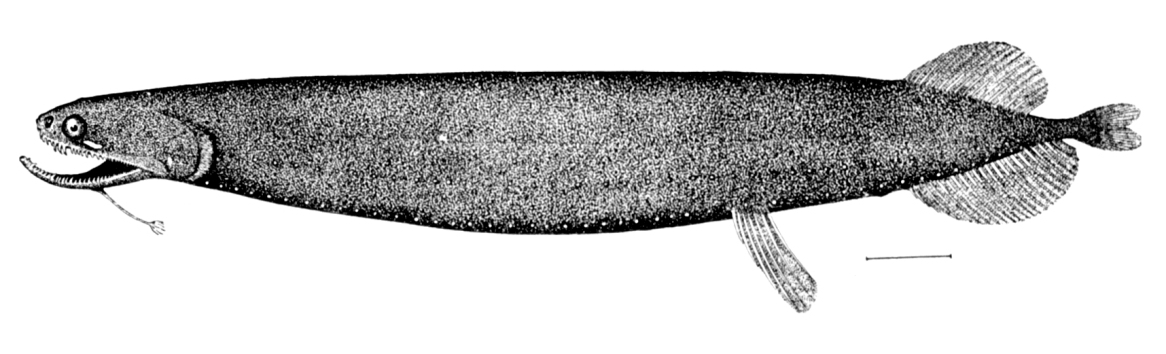
- Photonectes margarita

Scientific classification
- Kingdom: Animalia
- Phylum: Chordata
- Class: Actinopterygii
- Order: Stomiiformes
- Family: Stomiidae
- Subfamily: Melanostomiinae
- Genus: Photonectes; Günther, 1887

= Photonectes =

Genus of fishes

Photonectes is a genus of fish in the family Stomiidae found in Atlantic, Indian and Pacific Ocean.

== Species ==
There are currently 23 recognized species in this genus:

- Photonectes achirus Regan & Trewavas, 1930
- Photonectes albipennis (Döderlein (de), 1882) (White-pen dragonfish)
- Photonectes barnetti Klepadlo, 2011
- Photonectes braueri (Zugmayer, 1913) (Brauer's dragonfish)
- Photonectes caerulescens Regan & Trewavas, 1930 (Bulb-less dragonfish)
- Photonectes coffea Klepadlo, 2011
- Photonectes cornutus Beebe, 1933
- Photonectes corynodes Klepadlo, 2011
- Photonectes dinema Regan & Trewavas, 1930
- Photonectes gorodinskii Prokofiev, 2015
- Photonectes gracilis Goode & T. H. Bean, 1896 (Graceful dragonfish)
- Photonectes klepadloae Prokofiev & Frable, 2021
- Photonectes leucospilus Regan & Trewavas, 1930
- Photonectes litvinovi Prokofiev, 2014
- Photonectes margarita (Goode & T. H. Bean, 1896)
- Photonectes mirabilis A. E. Parr, 1927 (Blue-band dragonfish)
- Photonectes munificus Gibbs, 1968
- Photonectes parvimanus Regan & Trewavas, 1930 (Fleshy-fin dragonfish)
- Photonectes paxtoni Flynn & Klepadlo, 2012
- Photonectes phyllopogon Regan & Trewavas, 1930
- Photonectes uncinatus Prokofiev, 2015
- Photonectes venetaenia Prokofiev, 2016
- Photonectes waitti Flynn & Klepadlo, 2012
