= Photonectes klepadloae =

Scientific classification
- Kingdom: Animalia
- Phylum: Chordata
- Class: Actinopterygii
- Order: Stomiiformes
- Family: Stomiidae
- Genus: Photonectes
- Species: P. klepadloae

Binomial name
- Photonectes klepadloae Prokofiev & Frable, 2021

Species of fish

Photonectes klepadloae is a species of deep-sea fish in the genus Photonectes. The species is distributed across the Pacific Ocean, and adults can reach a maximum length of ~11.9 centimeters.

== Description ==
The species can be distinguished from congeners by the location of the phosphorescent postorbital organ, which is shifted forward to below the eye, and by two wide-spaced, interrupted luminous blue lines on the body.
