= Valenciennellus =

Constellationfishes Temporal range: Early Eocene to Present

Scientific classification
- Kingdom: Animalia
- Phylum: Chordata
- Class: Actinopterygii
- Order: Stomiiformes
- Family: Sternoptychidae
- Subfamily: Maurolicinae
- Genus: Valenciennellus; D. S. Jordan & Evermann, 1896

Type species
- Maurolicus tripunctulatus Esmark, 1871

Genus of fishes

Valenciennellus is a genus of marine hatchetfishes. They are commonly known as constellationfishes.

== Species ==
There are currently two recognized species in this genus:

- Valenciennellus carlsbergi Bruun, 1931
- Valenciennellus tripunctulatus (Esmark (sv), 1871) (Constellationfish)

Fossils of constellationfishes are known since the Early Eocene, more than 40 million years ago.
