= Photonectes gorodinskii =

Conservation status
- Data Deficient (IUCN 3.1)

Scientific classification
- Kingdom: Animalia
- Phylum: Chordata
- Class: Actinopterygii
- Order: Stomiiformes
- Family: Stomiidae
- Genus: Photonectes
- Species: P. gorodinskii

Binomial name
- Photonectes gorodinskii Prokofiev, 2015

Species of fish

Photonectes gorodinskii is a species of deep-sea fish in the genus Photonectes. The species has been observed in the Pacific Ocean, and adults can reach a maximum length of ~18 centimeters.
