= Photonectes paxtoni =

Conservation status
- Data Deficient (IUCN 3.1)

Scientific classification
- Kingdom: Animalia
- Phylum: Chordata
- Class: Actinopterygii
- Order: Stomiiformes
- Family: Stomiidae
- Genus: Photonectes
- Species: P. paxtoni

Binomial name
- Photonectes paxtoni Flynn & Klepadlo, 2012

Species of fish

Photonectes paxtoni is a species of fish in the genus Photonectes. The species has been documented in the Pacific Ocean off the coast of Papua New Guinea, and adults can reach a maximum length of 2.3 centimeters.

== Etymology ==
The fish is named in honor of American-born Australian ichthyologist John R. Paxton of the Australian Museum in Sydney.
