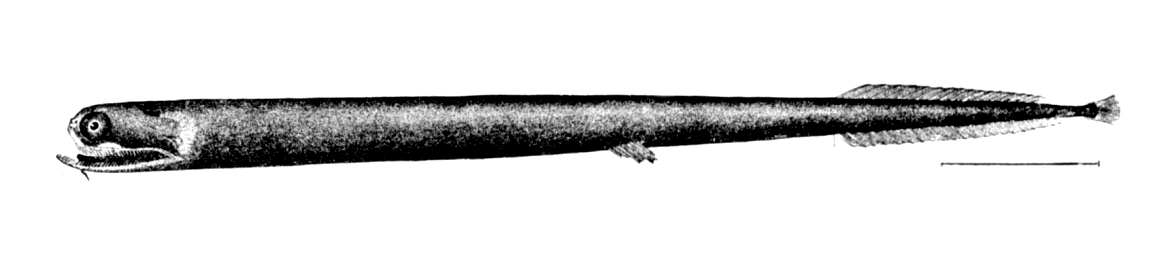

Conservation status
- Least Concern (IUCN 3.1)

Scientific classification
- Kingdom: Animalia
- Phylum: Chordata
- Class: Actinopterygii
- Order: Stomiiformes
- Family: Stomiidae
- Genus: Photonectes
- Species: P. gracilis

Binomial name
- Photonectes gracilis Goode & Bean, 1896

= Photonectes gracilis =

Species of fish

Photonectes gracilis is a species of deep-sea fish in the genus Photonectes. The species has been documented in the Indian and Pacific oceans, and adults can reach a maximum length of ~20.8 centimeters.
