= Leptostomias haplocaulus =

Conservation status
- Least Concern (IUCN 3.1)

Scientific classification
- Kingdom: Animalia
- Phylum: Chordata
- Class: Actinopterygii
- Order: Stomiiformes
- Family: Stomiidae
- Genus: Leptostomias
- Species: L. haplocaulus

Binomial name
- Leptostomias haplocaulus Regan & Trewavas, 1930

Species of fish

Leptostomias haplocaulus is a species of fish in the genus Leptostomias. The species has been documented in the Atlantic, Pacific and Indian oceans, and fully-grown adults can reach a maximum length of ~37.6 centimetres (14.8 in).
