= Leptostomias bermudensis =

Conservation status
- Least Concern (IUCN 3.1)

Scientific classification
- Kingdom: Animalia
- Phylum: Chordata
- Class: Actinopterygii
- Order: Stomiiformes
- Family: Stomiidae
- Genus: Leptostomias
- Species: L. bermudensis

Binomial name
- Leptostomias bermudensis Beebe, 1932

Species of fish

Leptostomias bermudensis is a species of deep-sea fish in the genus Leptostomias. The species has been observed in the Atlantic Ocean near Bermuda, and fully-grown adults can reach a maximum length of ~26.7 centimetres (10.5 in).
