= Photonectes albipennis =

Conservation status
- Least Concern (IUCN 3.1)

Scientific classification
- Kingdom: Animalia
- Phylum: Chordata
- Class: Actinopterygii
- Order: Stomiiformes
- Family: Stomiidae
- Genus: Photonectes
- Species: P. albipennis

Binomial name
- Photonectes albipennis (Döderlein, 1882)

Species of fish

Photonectes albipennis is a species of deep-sea fish in the genus Photonectes. The species is distributed across the Pacific Ocean, and is commonly observed off the coast of Hawaii. Members of the species can reach a maximum length of ~30 centimeters.
