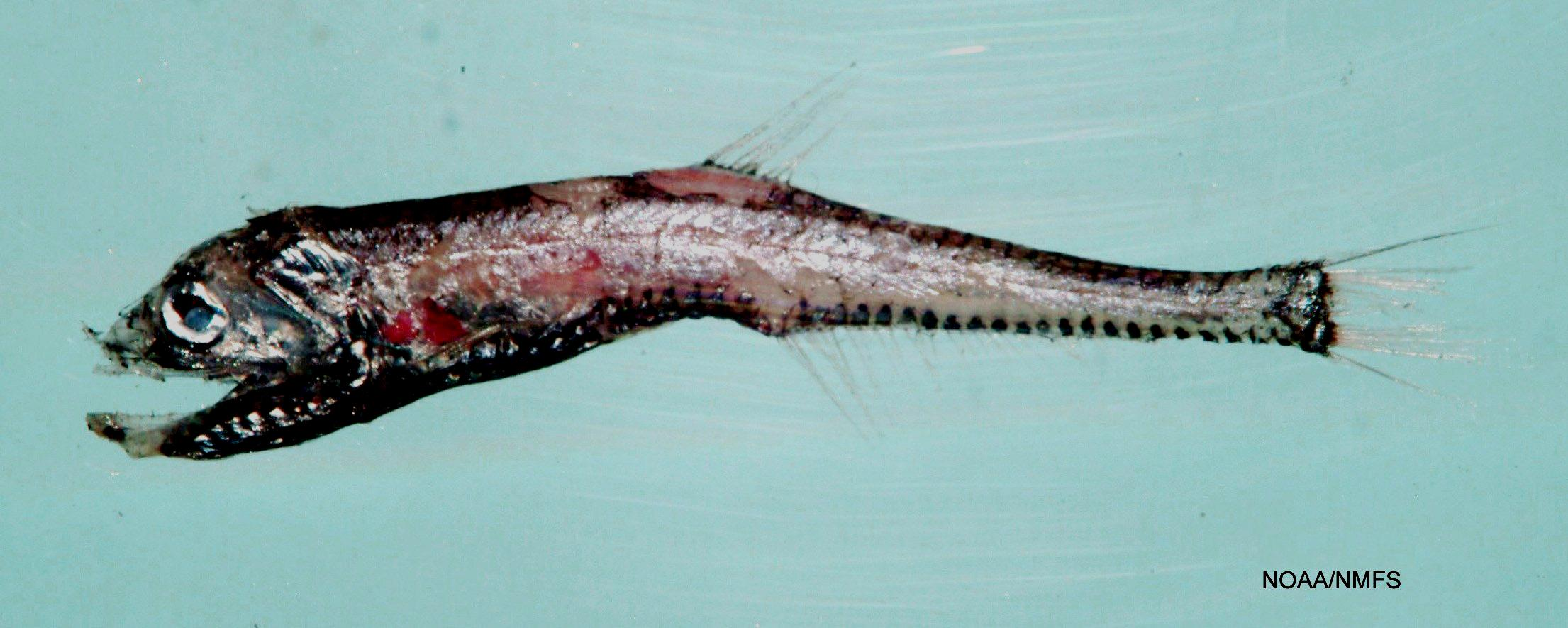
- Polymetme corythaeola

Scientific classification
- Kingdom: Animalia
- Phylum: Chordata
- Class: Actinopterygii
- Order: Stomiiformes
- Family: Yarrellidae; Chang et al., 2025

Species
- Polymetme McCulloch, 1926; Yarrella Goode & T. H. Bean, 1896

= Yarrellidae =

The Yarrellidae, also known as rendezvousfishes, are a family of mesopelagic marine stomiiform fish found in deep waters worldwide.

The following two genera are placed in this family:

- Polymetme McCulloch, 1926
- Yarrella Goode & T. H. Bean, 1896

Members of this family were formerly placed in the family Phosichthyidae, but a 2025 phylogenetic study found the latter family to be paraphyletic as previously described. One clade comprising two genera was found to form a distinct lineage, and was thus described as its own family, the Yarrellidae.
