= Thorophos =

Scientific classification
- Kingdom: Animalia
- Phylum: Chordata
- Class: Actinopterygii
- Order: Stomiiformes
- Family: Sternoptychidae
- Subfamily: Maurolicinae
- Genus: Thorophos; Bruun, 1931

Type species
- Thorophos euryops Bruun, 1931

Synonyms
- Neophos Myers, 1932

Genus of fishes

Thorophos is a genus of marine hatchetfishes native to the western Central Pacific Ocean.

== Species ==
There are currently two recognized species in this genus:

- Thorophos euryops Bruun, 1931
- Thorophos nexilis (G. S. Myers, 1932)
