= Photonectes caerulescens =

Conservation status
- Least Concern (IUCN 3.1)

Scientific classification
- Kingdom: Animalia
- Phylum: Chordata
- Class: Actinopterygii
- Order: Stomiiformes
- Family: Stomiidae
- Genus: Photonectes
- Species: P. caerulescens

Binomial name
- Photonectes caerulescens Regan & Trewavas, 1930

Species of fish

Photonectes caerulescens is a species of deep-sea fish in the genus Photonectes. The species is distributed across the Indian and Pacific oceans, and adults can reach a maximum length of ~15 centimeters.
