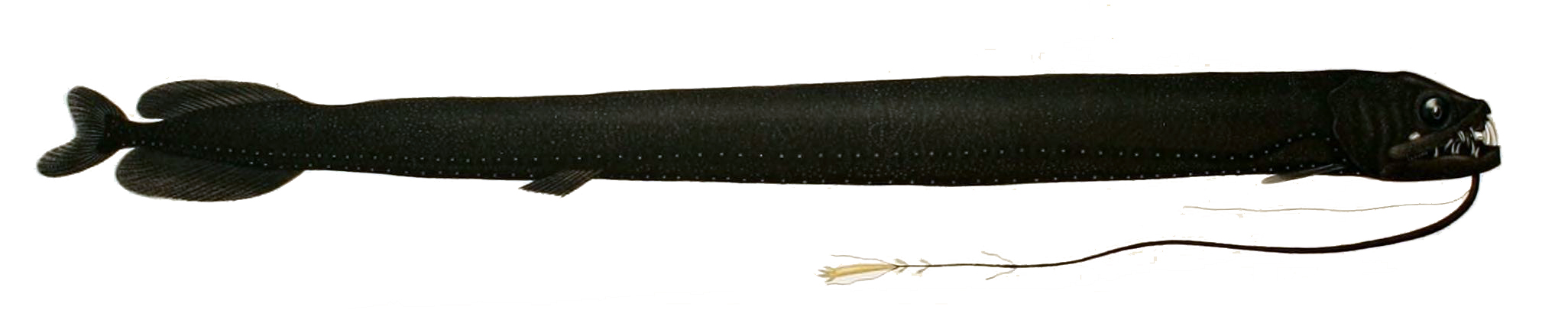

Conservation status
- Least Concern (IUCN 3.1)

Scientific classification
- Domain: Eukaryota
- Kingdom: Animalia
- Phylum: Chordata
- Class: Actinopterygii
- Order: Stomiiformes
- Family: Stomiidae
- Genus: Leptostomias
- Species: L. gladiator

Binomial name
- Leptostomias gladiator (Zugmayer, 1911)

Synonyms
- Leptostomias problematicus Parr, 1927; Leptostomias ramosus Regan & Trewavas, 1930; Melanostomias gladiator Zugmayer, 1911; Melanostomias problematicus Parr, 1927; Melanostomias ramosus Regan & Trewavas, 1930; Nematostomias gladiator Zugmayer, 1911

= Leptostomias gladiator =

Species of fish

Leptostomias gladiator is a species of fish in the family Stomiidae (barbeled dragonfish). It is sometimes called the scaleless dragonfish, but that name is shared with many other species.

== Description ==
Leptostomias gladiator has a slender body, blackish brown to deep black. The bulb of its barbel is creamy yellow, and its photophores are violet. Its length is maximum 37.3 cm (14.7 in). It has 19–22 dorsal soft rays and 23–29 anal soft rays. It has 77 vertebrae.

== Habitat ==
Leptostomias gladiator lives in non-polar oceans worldwide. It is bathypelagic, living at depths up to 5,000 m (3.1 mi).

== Behaviour ==
Leptostomias gladiator eats lanternfish.
