= Danaphos =

Bottlelights Temporal range: Middle Eocene to Present 37–0 Ma

Scientific classification
- Kingdom: Animalia
- Phylum: Chordata
- Class: Actinopterygii
- Division: Teleostei
- Order: Stomiiformes
- Family: Sternoptychidae
- Subfamily: Maurolicinae
- Genus: Danaphos; Bruun, 1931

Genus of fishes

Danaphos is an oceanic ray-finned fish genus which belongs in the family Sternoptychidae. A common name is bottlelights.

== Species ==
There are currently two recognized species in this genus:

- Danaphos asteroscopus Bruun, 1931
- Danaphos oculatus (Garman, 1899) (Bottlelights, Bigeye Lightfish)

Fossils of bottlelights show that the genus was already distinct in the Late Eocene, more than 35 million years ago.
