= Photonectes coffea =

Conservation status
- Least Concern (IUCN 3.1)

Scientific classification
- Domain: Eukaryota
- Kingdom: Animalia
- Phylum: Chordata
- Class: Actinopterygii
- Order: Stomiiformes
- Family: Stomiidae
- Genus: Photonectes
- Species: P. coffea

Binomial name
- Photonectes coffea Klepadlo, 2011

Species of fish

Photonectes coffea is a species of deep-sea fish in the genus Photonectes. The species has been observed in the Pacific Ocean, off the coast of the Philippines.
