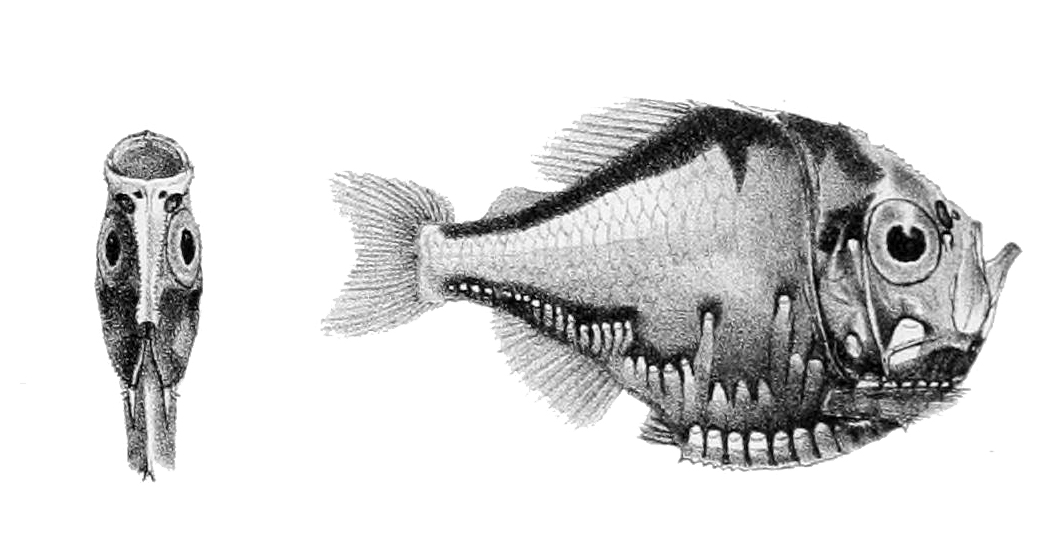

Scientific classification
- Kingdom: Animalia
- Phylum: Chordata
- Class: Actinopterygii
- Division: Teleostei
- Order: Stomiiformes
- Family: Sternoptychidae
- Genus: Polyipnus
- Species: P. spinosus

Binomial name
- Polyipnus spinosus Günther, 1887

= Polyipnus spinosus =

Species of fish

Polyipnus spinosus, commonly known as the spiny hatchetfish, is a species of ray-finned fish in the family Sternoptychidae.

== Habitat and distribution ==
It occurs in deep water in the western central Pacific Ocean, at depths down to about 500 metres (1,600 ft).
