= Polyipnus danae =

Scientific classification
- Domain: Eukaryota
- Kingdom: Animalia
- Phylum: Chordata
- Class: Actinopterygii
- Order: Stomiiformes
- Family: Sternoptychidae
- Genus: Polyipnus
- Species: P. danae

Binomial name
- Polyipnus danae Harold, 1994

Species of ray-finned fish

Polyipnus danae is a species of ray-finned fish in the genus Polyipnus. It is found in the South China Sea in waters from 0 - 700 meters.
