= Leptostomias bilobatus =

Conservation status
- Least Concern (IUCN 3.1)

Scientific classification
- Kingdom: Animalia
- Phylum: Chordata
- Class: Actinopterygii
- Order: Stomiiformes
- Family: Stomiidae
- Genus: Leptostomias
- Species: L. bilobatus

Binomial name
- Leptostomias bilobatus (Koefoed, 1956)

Species of fish

Leptostomias bilobatus is a species of deep-sea fish in the genus Leptostomias. The species has been observed in the Atlantic and Indian oceans, and fully-grown adults can reach a maximum length of ~11 centimetres (4.3 in).
