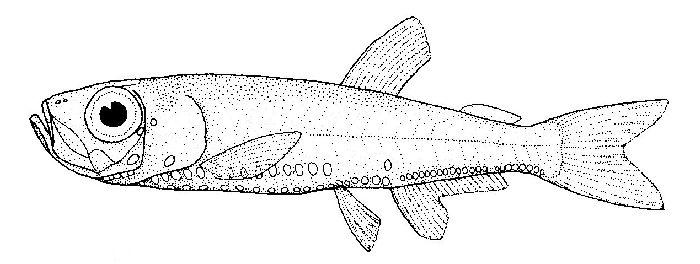
- Mueller's pearlside, Maurolicus muelleri

Scientific classification
- Kingdom: Animalia
- Phylum: Chordata
- Class: Actinopterygii
- Order: Stomiiformes
- Family: Sternoptychidae
- Subfamily: Maurolicinae
- Genus: Maurolicus; Cocco, 1838

Diversity
- 15 species

= Maurolicus =

Pearlsides Temporal range: Miocene to Present

Genus of fishes

Maurolicus is an oceanic ray-finned fish genus which belongs in the marine hatchetfish family Sternoptychidae. They are commonly known as pearlsides, but the brilliant pearlside is the related Argyripnus iridescens. Occasionally, "bristle-mouth fishes" is used as a common name, but that usually refers to the genus Argyripnus or the family Gonostomatidae.

Fossils of pearlsides are known from the Miocene.

== Species ==
There are currently 15 recognized species in this genus:

- Maurolicus amethystinopunctatus Cocco, 1838
- Maurolicus australis Hector, 1875 (pennant pearlside)
- Maurolicus breviculus Parin & Kobyliansky, 1993
- Maurolicus imperatorius Parin & Kobyliansky, 1993 (Emperor seamount lightfish)
- Maurolicus inventionis Parin & Kobyliansky, 1993
- Maurolicus japonicus Ishikawa, 1915 (North Pacific lightfish)
- Maurolicus javanicus Parin & Kobyliansky, 1993 (Javan pearlside)
- Maurolicus kornilovorum Parin & Kobyliansky, 1993
- Maurolicus mucronatus Klunzinger, 1871
- Maurolicus muelleri (J. F. Gmelin, 1789) (Silvery lightfish, Mueller's pearlside, Mueller's bristle-mouth fish)
- Maurolicus parvipinnis Vaillant, 1888
- Maurolicus rudjakovi Parin & Kobyliansky, 1993
- Maurolicus stehmanni Parin & Kobyliansky, 1996
- Maurolicus walvisensis Parin & Kobyliansky, 1993
- Maurolicus weitzmani Parin & Kobyliansky, 1993 (Atlantic pearlside, Weitzman's pearlside)
