= Paravinciguerria =

Paravinciguerria Temporal range: Lower Cenomanian

Scientific classification
- Domain: Eukaryota
- Kingdom: Animalia
- Phylum: Chordata
- Class: Actinopterygii
- Order: Stomiiformes
- Genus: Paravinciguerria; Arambourg, 1955

Paravinciguerria is an extinct genus of prehistoric bony and ray-finned fish that lived during the lower Cenomanian, an age within the Cretaceous period. It is one of the first known genera in the order Stomiiformes.

== See also ==
- Prehistoric fish
- List of prehistoric bony fish
