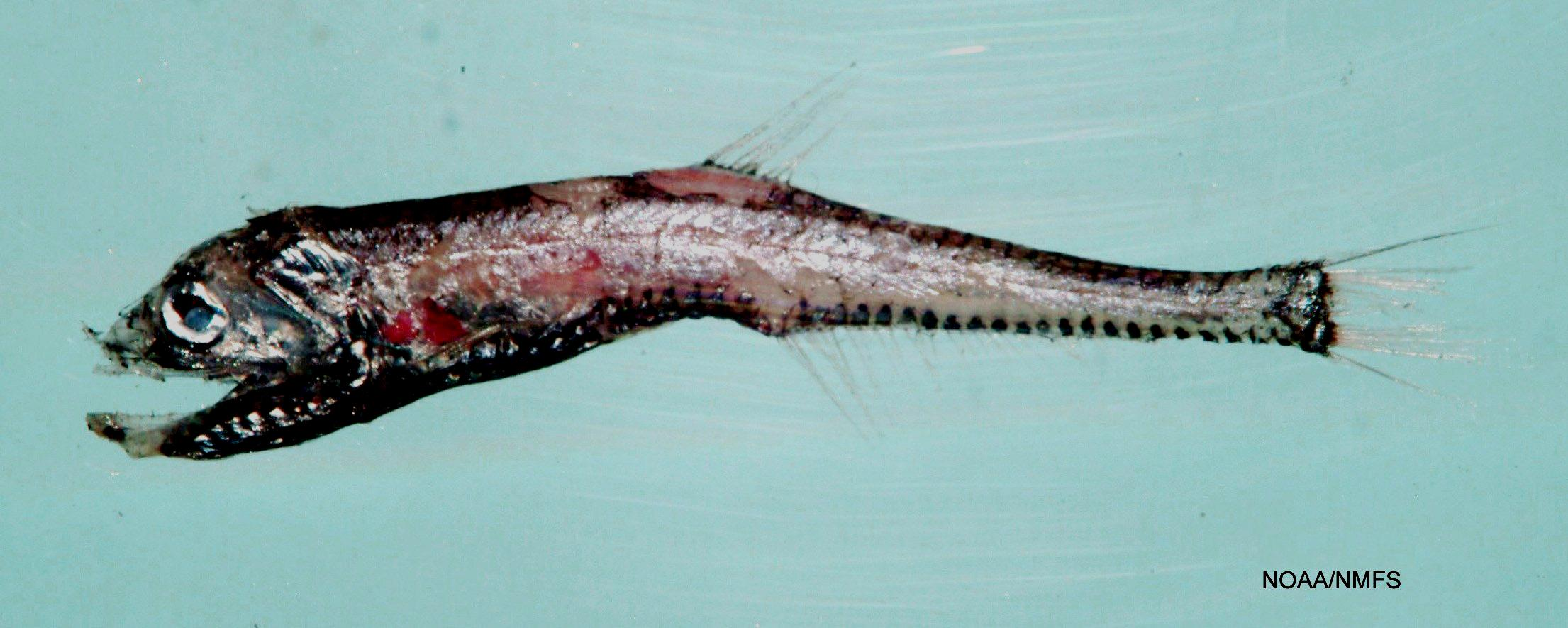
- Rendezvous fish (P. corythaeola)
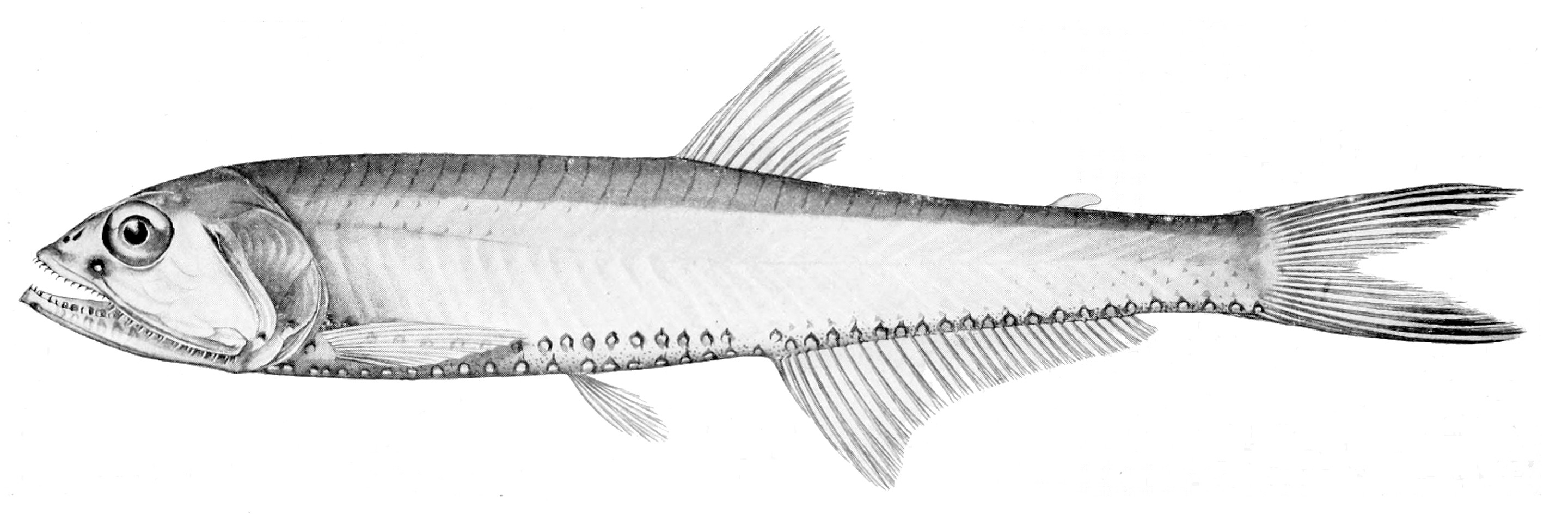
- Brilliant lightfish (P. illustris)

Scientific classification
- Domain: Eukaryota
- Kingdom: Animalia
- Phylum: Chordata
- Class: Actinopterygii
- Order: Stomiiformes
- Family: Phosichthyidae
- Genus: Polymetme; McCulloch, 1926

= Polymetme =

Genus of fishes

Polymetme is a genus of lightfishes.

== Species ==
There are currently six recognized species in this genus:

- Polymetme andriashevi Parin & Borodulina, 1990
- Polymetme corythaeola (Alcock, 1898) (Rendezvous fish)
- Polymetme elongata (Matsubara, 1938)
- Polymetme illustris McCulloch, 1926 (Brilliant lightfish)
- Polymetme surugaensis (Matsubara, 1943) (Suruga lightfish)
- Polymetme thaeocoryla Parin & Borodulina, 1990
