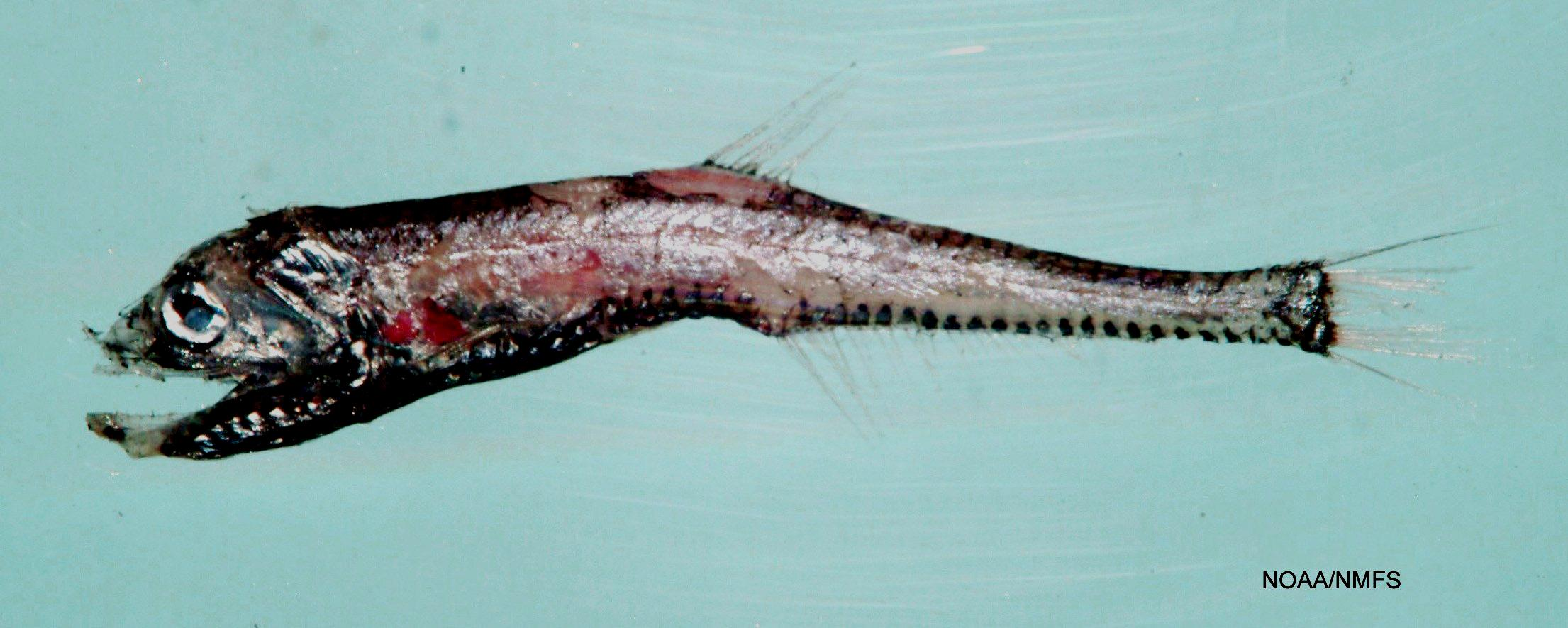

Conservation status
- Least Concern (IUCN 3.1)

Scientific classification
- Kingdom: Animalia
- Phylum: Chordata
- Class: Actinopterygii
- Order: Stomiiformes
- Family: Phosichthyidae
- Genus: Polymetme
- Species: P. corythaeola

Binomial name
- Polymetme corythaeola (Alcock, 1898)

Synonyms
- Diplophos corythaeolum Alcock, 1898; Pollymetme corythaeola Alcock, 1898; Polymetme africana Gilchrist & von Bonde, 1924; Yarella corythaeola Alcock, 1898; Yarrella africana Gilchrist & von Bonde, 1924; Yarrella blackfordi africana Alcock, 1898; Yarrella blackfordi corythaeola Gilchrist & von Bonde, 1924; Yarrella blackfordi illustris Alcock, 1898; Yarrella corythaeola McCulloch, 1926; Yarrella illustris Alcock, 1898; Diplophos corythaeolum McCulloch, 1926

= Rendezvous fish =

Species of ray-finned fish

The rendezvous fish (Polymetme corythaeola) is a species of fish in the family Phosichthyidae (lightfish).

Its specific name is derived from the Greek κόρυθος (korythos, "helmet"); and αἰόλος (aiolos, "glittering").

== Description ==
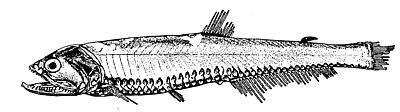
Drawing

The rendezvous fish has a dark dorsum, with silver flanks and a black pigment on the outer caudal rays. Its length is maximum 26 cm (10 in). It has a large mouth and medium-sized eyes. It has two rows of photophores on its body. It has 10–14 dorsal soft rays, 27–34 anal soft rays and 43–45 vertebrae. It has an adipose fin.

== Habitat ==
The rendezvous fish is benthopelagic, living in coastal waters worldwide.
