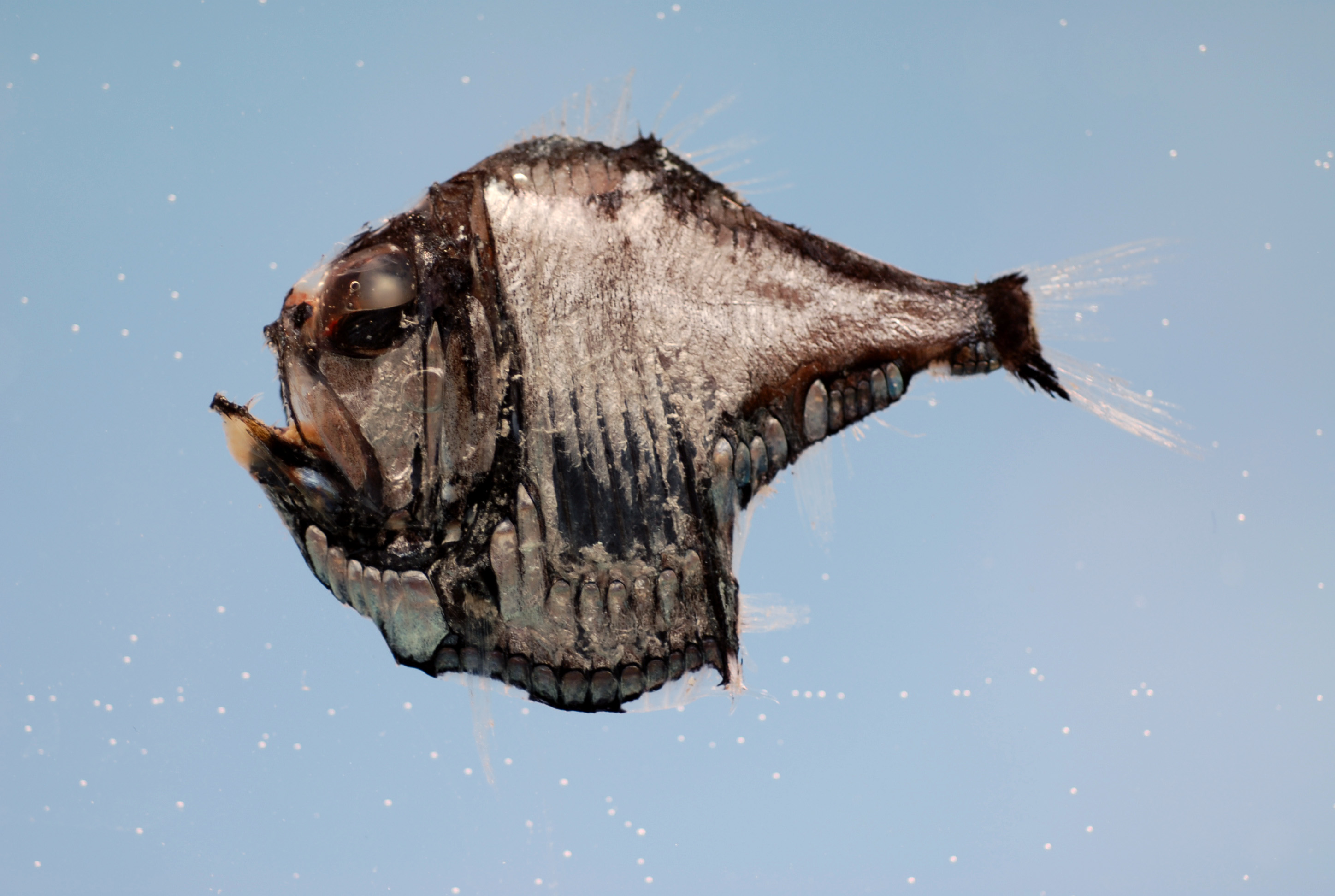
- Lovely hatchetfish, Argyropelecus aculeatus (Sternoptychinae)

Scientific classification
- Kingdom: Animalia
- Phylum: Chordata
- Class: Actinopterygii
- Division: Teleostei
- Order: Stomiiformes
- Suborder: Gonostomatoidei
- Family: Sternoptychidae; T. N. Gill, 1863

Subfamilies
- Maurolicinae; Sternoptychinae (but see text)

= Sternoptychidae =

Sternoptychidae Temporal range: Eocene–present

Family of fishes

The marine hatchetfishes or deep-sea hatchetfishes as well as the related bottlelights, pearlsides and constellationfishes are small deep-sea ray-finned fish of the stomiiform family Sternoptychidae. They are not closely related to and should not be confused with the freshwater hatchetfishes, which are teleosts in the characiform family Gasteropelecidae. The Sternoptychidae have 10 genera and about 70 species altogether.

The scientific name means "Sternoptyx-family", from Sternoptyx (the type genus) + the standard animal family suffix "-idae". The type genus derives from Ancient Greek stérnon (στέρνον, "breast") + ptýx (πτύξ, "a fold/crease") + Latin forma ("external form"), the Greek part in reference to the thorax shape of marine hatchetfishes.

== Description and ecology ==
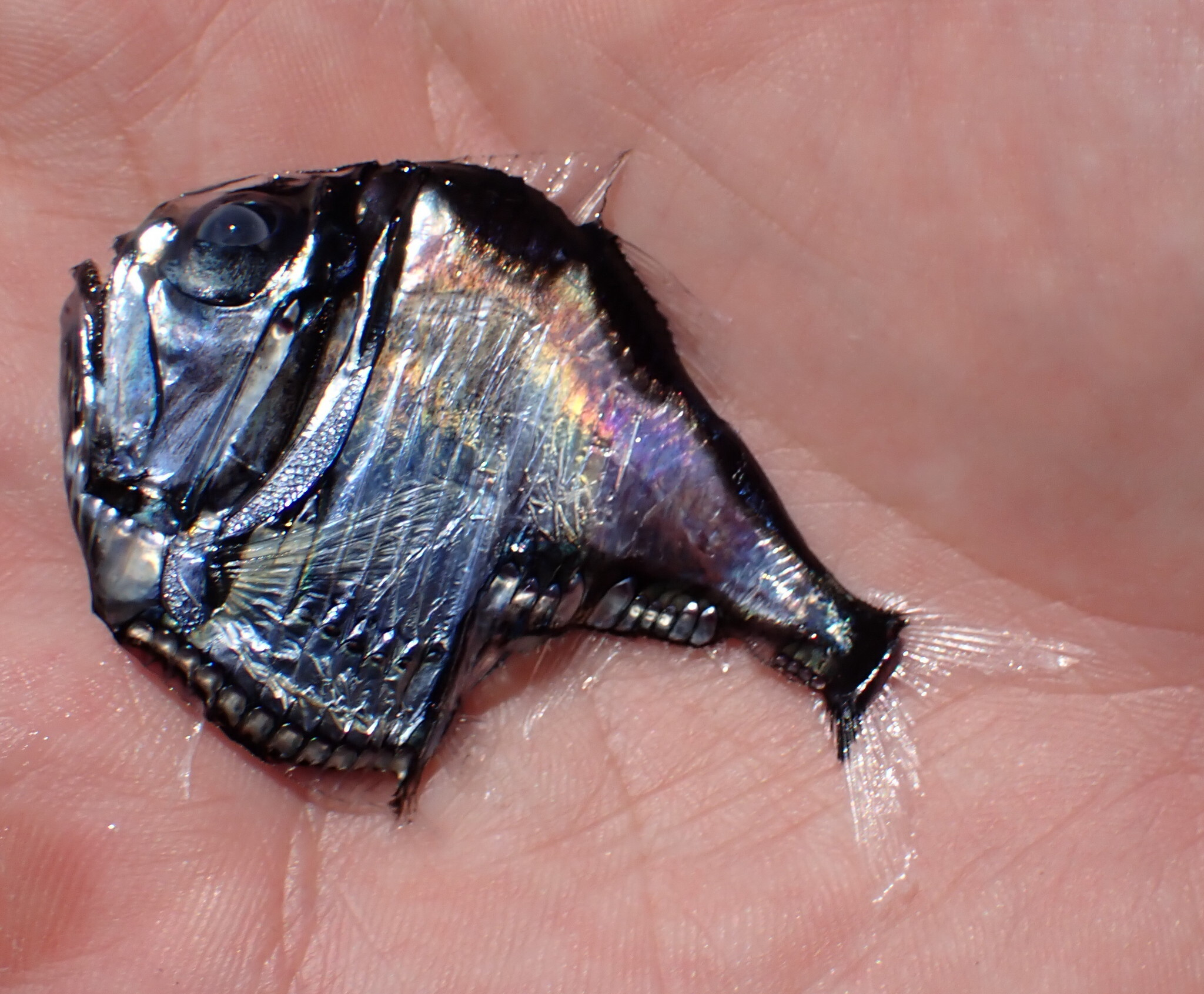
Argyropelecus aculeatus, in Portugal

Found most often at depths of 200–600 meters in tropical, subtropical and temperate waters of the Atlantic, Pacific and Indian Oceans, marine hatchetfishes range in size from Polyipnus danae at 2.8 cm (1.1 in) to the c.12 cm (4.7 in)-long giant hatchetfish (Argyropelecus gigas).

The members of the disputed subfamily Maurolicinae have a more conventional fish shape. The mouth is located at the tip of the snout and directed downwards, more so in the Sternoptychinae.

Unlike other Stomiiformes, they still have fully developed pseudobranchs. Their branchiostegal rays are 6–10, three of them attach to the posterior ceratohyal (epihyal). Their bodies are covered in delicate silvery scales which abrade easily. In some species, such as the Highlight Hatchetfish (Sternoptyx pseudobscura), large sections of the body at the base of the anal fin and/or caudal fin are transparent. The anal fin has 11–38 rays and may be divided in two parts. An adipose fin is usually present. The Sternoptychinae have preopercular spines and blade-like pterygiophores in front of the dorsal fin. Their large, sometimes tube-shaped eyes can collect the faintest of light and focus well on objects both close and far. In many genera, the eyes are fixed gazing permanently upwards, enabling them to discern the silhouettes of prey moving overhead against the slightly brighter upper waters.

Sternoptychidae undertake nightly mass migrations from depths of 3,600 metres to the upper 50–100 metres of the starlit water column. There they feed throughout the night, returning to the depths by daybreak. Their prey consists primarily of tiny crustaceans, such as amphipods, copepods, euphausiids (krill) and ostracods (seed shrimp), and of fish smaller than themselves. What little is known of their life cycle suggests that at least some members of this family are short-lived, dying after no more than a year. They spawn in the open water, and do not guard or otherwise care for their offspring; species with a short lifespan are presumably semelparous The fry – even of Sternoptychinae – look like tiny pearlsides (Maurolicus).

=== Bioluminescence ===
Marine hatchetfishes are not the only animals that seek out prey by watching for silhouettes from below. Indeed, many fishes that consider Sternoptychidae prey do so, and to foil their predaceous attempts, the Sternoptychidae have evolved an astounding ability: bioluminescent counter-illumination.

Counterillumination (or counter-lighting) involves the production of light by the fish for the purpose of camouflaging its silhouette from observers lurking below. Sternoptychidae produce this light with organs called photophores, of which they have between 3 and 7 – usually 6 – on the branchiostegal membrane along the lower edge of the chest and belly. The intensity of the light produced is controlled by the fish, an appropriate brightness chosen according to how much light reaches the eyes from above. The patterns of light created by the photophores are also unique to each species, probably playing a role in courtship.

== Systematics ==
The Sternoptychidae belong to the order Stomiiformes, which is often placed in the teleost superorder Stenopterygii, usually together with the Ateleopodiformes (jellynoses), but sometimes on their own. But it may well be that the closest living relatives of the "Stenopterygii" are found among the superorder Protacanthopterygii, and that the former would need to be merged in the latter. In some classifications, the "Stenopterygii" are kept separate but included with the Protacanthopterygii and the monotypic superorder Cyclosquamata in an unranked clade called Euteleostei. That would probably require splitting two additional monotypic superorders out of the Protacanthopterygii, and thus result in a profusion of very small taxa.

The Stomiiformes have also been considered close relatives of the Aulopiformes. The latter are otherwise placed in a monotypic superorder "Cyclosquamata" but also appear to be quite close to the Protacanthopterygii indeed. The relationships of these – and the Lampriformes or Myctophiformes, which are also usually treated as monotypic superorders – to the taxa mentioned before is still not well resolved at all, and regardless whether one calls them Protacanthopterygii sensu lato or Euteleostei, the phylogeny of this group of moderately advanced Teleostei is in need of further study.

The ancestral Stomiiformes probably resembled the Gonostomatidae, with thin brownish bodies, rows of egg-shaped photophores adorning the lower body parts, and mouths with numerous teeth. The family Gonostomatidae is the closest living relative of the Sternoptychidae, and these two form the suborder Gonostomatoidei. Indeed, some Sternoptychidae are called "bristlemouths", like the bulk of the Gonostomatidae. Compared to their relatives, the marine hatchetfishes are a more apomorphic group, but they have evolved in an entirely different direction from the other "advanced" lineage of Stomiiformes, the huge family Stomiidae.

=== Classification ===
Typically, the Sternoptychidae are divided into two subfamilies, with the more plesiomorphic members making up the Maurolicinae. Symplesiomorphies are no reliable indicator of actual relationships, however. While it remains to be seen what Sternoptychidae other than the pearlsides (Maurolicus, the type genus) do actually belong in the Maurolicinae, it is unlikely that the two-subfamily arrangement is correct. It may even be that the Maurolicinae are just an indiscriminate assemblage of unrelated basal Sternoptychidae and are altogether invalid. The Sternoptychinae – the "true" marine hatchetfishes – on the other hand are monophyletic.

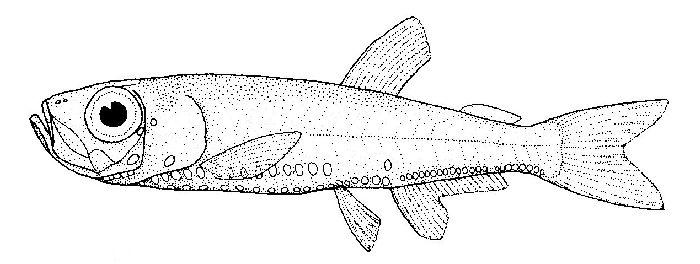
Mueller's pearlside, Maurolicus muelleri (Maurolicinae)

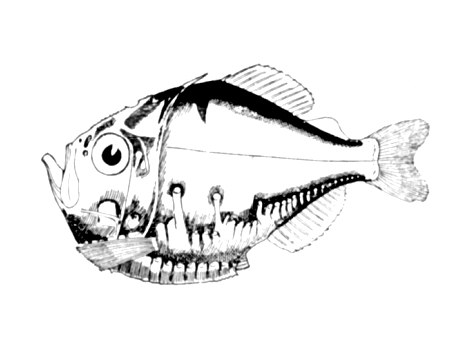
Spiny hatchetfish, Polyipnus spinosus (Sternoptychinae)

The provisional arrangement of subfamilies and genera of Sternoptychidae is as follows:

- Genus †Eknomodophos (Oligocene of North Caucasus, Russia)
- Genus †Xenomesopelagia (Oligocene of Poland)
- Subfamily Maurolicinae
  - Genus Araiophos (2 species)
  - Genus †Archaeolicus
  - Genus Argyripnus – bristle-mouth fishes (6 species)
  - Genus Danaphos – bottlelights (1–2 species)
  - Genus †Jerzmanskaephos (Oligocene of Poland)
  - Genus Maurolicus – pearlsides (15 species)
  - Genus Sonoda (2 species)
  - Genus Thorophos (2 species)
  - Genus Valenciennellus – constellationfishes (2 species)
- Subfamily Sternoptychinae – marine hatchetfishes, deep-sea hatchetfishes
  - Genus Argyropelecus – silver hatchetfishes (7 species)
  - Genus Polyipnus (32 species)
  - Genus Sternoptyx (4 species)
  - †Discosternon (Miocene of Italy)
  - †Eosternoptyx (middle-late Eocene of Iran)
  - †Horbatshia (Oligocene of Poland)
  - †Polyipnoides (middle Eocene of Georgia)
