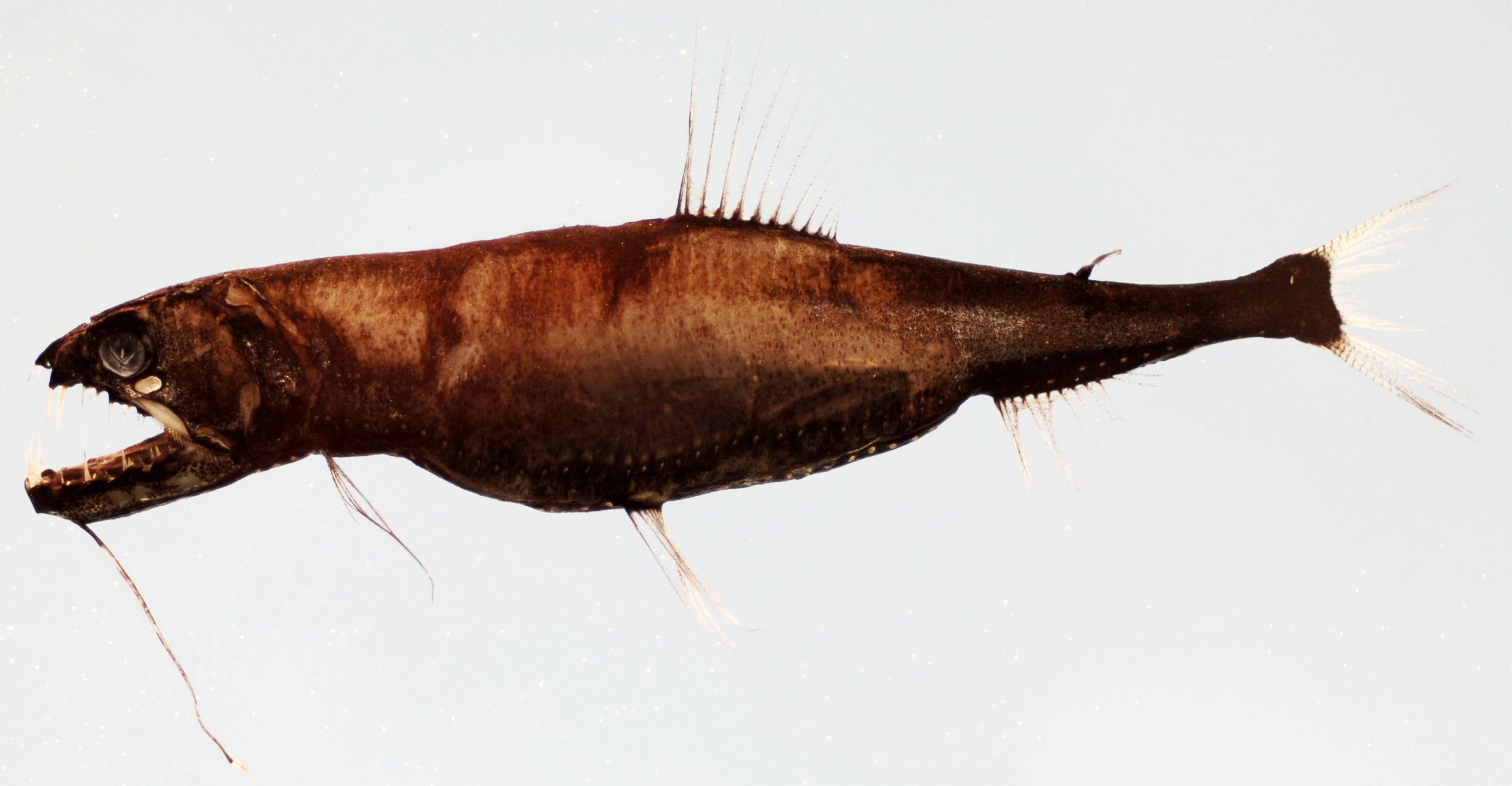
- Astronesthes similus (Phosichthyoidei: Stomiidae)

Scientific classification
- Kingdom: Animalia
- Phylum: Chordata
- Class: Actinopterygii
- Division: Teleostei
- Superorder: Osmeromorpha
- Order: Stomiiformes; Regan, 1909

Type species
- Stomias boa boa (A. Risso, 1810)

Families
- See text

Synonyms
- Gonostomatiformes

= Stomiiformes =

Stomiiformes Temporal range: Cenomanian–present

Order of fishes

Stomiiformes /ˈstɒmi.ɪfɔːrmiːz/ is an order of deep-sea ray-finned fishes of very diverse morphology. It includes, for example, dragonfishes, lightfishes (Gonostomatidae and Phosichthyidae), loosejaws, marine hatchetfishes and viperfishes. The order contains 4 families (5 according to some authors) with more than 50 genera and at least 410 species. As usual for deep-sea fishes, there are few common names for species of the order, but the Stomiiformes as a whole are often called dragonfishes and allies or simply stomiiforms.

The scientific name means "Stomias-shaped", from Stomias (the type genus) + the standard fish order suffix "-formes". It ultimately derives from Ancient Greek stóma (στόμᾶ, "mouth") + Latin forma ("external form"), the former in reference to the huge mouth opening of these fishes.

The earliest stomiiform is Paravinciguerria from the Cenomanian of Morocco and Italy.

== Description and ecology ==
Members of this order are mostly pelagic fishes living in deep oceanic waters. Their distribution around the world's oceans is very wide, ranging from subtropical and temperate waters up to subarctic or even Antarctic ones.

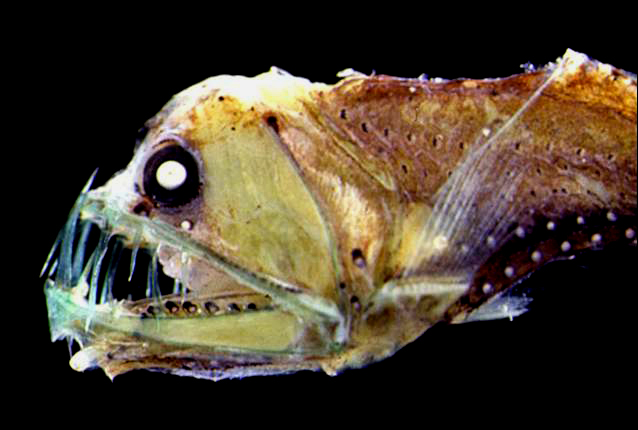
Head of Sloane's Viperfish, Chauliodus sloani

The smallest species of this order is the bristlemouth Cyclothone pygmaea. Native to the Mediterranean Sea, it reaches just 1.5 cm (0.6 in) as an adult. The largest species is the barbeled dragonfish Opostomias micripnus, widely found in the Atlantic, Indian and Pacific Oceans and measuring about 50 cm (20 in) in adult length.

These fish have a highly unusual and often almost nightmarish appearance. They all have teeth on the premaxilla and maxilla. Their maxillary ligaments, as well as some muscles and certain bones in the branchial cavity, are specialized in a distinctive way. Most have large mouths extending back past the eyes. Some also have a chin barbel. The dorsal and/or pectoral fins are missing in some, but others have an adipose fin. The pelvic fin has 4–9 rays, and the stomiiformes possess 5–24 branchiostegal rays. Their scales are cycloid, delicate and easily sloughed off; some are scaleless. The coloration is typically dark brown or black; a few (mostly Gonostomatoidei) are silver, and photophores (light-producing organs) are common in this order.

The teeth of stomiiformes are often transparent and non-reflective so that prey will be unlikely to see them in the light generated by bioluminescence. Research has revealed that the transparency of the teeth of Aristostomias scintillans is due to nanoscale structures composed hydroxyapatite and collagen and a lack dentin tubules, however a study from a decade prior had shown the teeth of Chauliodus sloani (which are also transparent) have dentin tubules. The reason behind difference in presence of dentin tubules in two species of the same family (Stomiidae) has yet to be addressed.

=== Bioluminescence ===
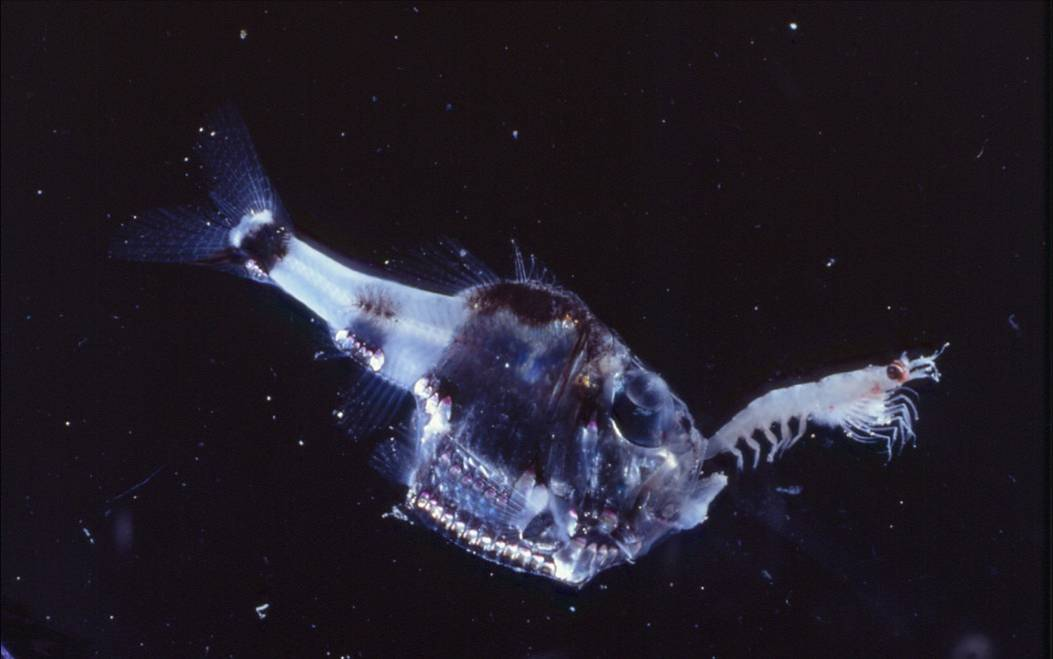
Half-naked Hatchetfish, Argyropelecus hemigymnus (Gonostomatoidei: Sternoptychidae), with a crustacean Note the photophores along the fish's belly

As common for deep-sea creatures, all members of Stomiiformes (except one) have photophores, whose structure is characteristic of the order. The light emitted can be more or less strong and its color can be light yellow, white, violet or red. The light coming from these fish is generally invisible to their prey. The lighting mechanism can be very simple – consisting of small gleaming points on the fish body – or very elaborate, involving lenses and refractors.

The most common arrangement is one or two rows of photophores on the ventral aspect of the body. The rows run from the head down to the tip of the tail. Photophores are also present in chin barbels of the family Stomiidae. The light produced in these glandular organs is the product of an enzymatic reaction, a catylization of coelenterazine by calcium ions.

=== Daily migration ===
During the day, Stomiiformes stay in deep waters. When the sun sets, most of them follow the dimming sunlight up to near-surface waters, which are richer in animal life such as small fishes and planktonic invertebrates. During the night, these Stomiiformes hunt and feed on such organisms, swimming back to deeper waters when the sun rises. They apparently are able to measure the intensity of the sunlight that reaches them. They will thus move to stay always in the zone where light intensity is very low, though it is not entirely dark.

This daily migration is well observed in quite a few species of stomiiforms. However, it is also performed by other fishes, while some larger Stomiiformes – among them the largest predators of the deep sea – stay in their habitat all the time and feed on smaller migrating fish that return from the surface.

=== Reproduction ===
Stomiiforms spawn generally in deep seas, but the eggs are light and float towards the ocean surface. They hatch in surface waters. When the larvae have completed their metamorphosis and look like adults, they descend to join the main population.

Like many benthic fish species, certain members of the order – especially in the genera Cyclothone and Gonostoma – change their sex during their life. When they become sexually mature, they are males; later on they transform into females.

== Systematics ==
The Stomiiformes are often placed in the teleost superorder Stenopterygii, usually together with the Ateleopodiformes (jellynoses), but sometimes on their own. Whether it is indeed justified to accept such a small group is doubtful; it may well be that the closest living relatives of the "Stenopterygii" are found among the superorder Protacanthopterygii, and that the former would need to be merged in the latter. In some classifications, the "Stenopterygii" are kept separate but included with the Protacanthopterygii and the monotypic superorder Cyclosquamata in an unranked clade called Euteleostei. That would probably require splitting two additional monotypic superorders out of the Protacanthopterygii, and thus result in a profusion of very small taxa.

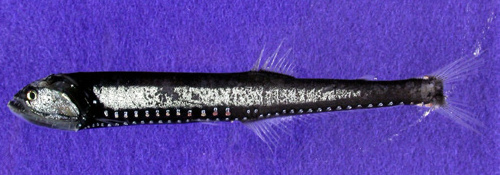
Elongated Bristlemouth, Gonostoma elongatum (Stomioidei: Gonostomatidae)

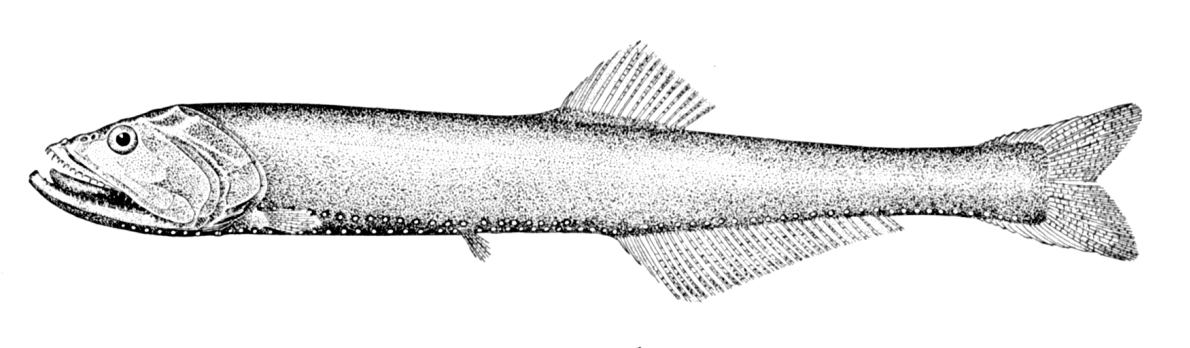
Yarrella blackfordi (Phosichthyoidei: Phosichthyidae)

The Stomiiformes have also been considered close relatives of the Aulopiformes. The latter are otherwise placed in a monotypic superorder "Cyclosquamata" but also appear to be quite close to the Protacanthopterygii indeed. The relationships of these – and the Lampriformes or Myctophiformes, which are also usually treated as monotypic superorders – to the taxa mentioned before is still not well resolved at all, and regardless whether one calls them Protacanthopterygii sensu lato or Euteleostei, the phylogeny of this group of moderately-advanced Teleostei is in need of further study.

The ancestral Stomiiformes probably had thin brownish bodies, rows of egg-shaped photophores adorning the lower body parts, and mouths with numerous teeth. From these, two lineages evolved, probably some time during the Late Cretaceous: Among the modern Stomiiformes, the Gonostomatidae and Phosichthyidae are phenetically very similar, but this is due to their being very plesiomorphic and retaining many traits of the original stomiiforms. Each of the two has characteristic synapomorphies with one of the more advanced stomiiform families – the Sternoptychidae and the Stomiidae, respectively. These two, in turn, are highly autapomorphic, and at a casual glance do not look as if they were as closely related to the other stomiiforms as they actually are.

In 2025, the previous two-suborder classification of the Stomiiformes was found to be paraphyletic, with the "bristlemouth"-type fish in Gonostomatidae and Phosichthyidae being found to form a grade leading to Stomiidae (with the Sternoptychidae also in this grade). This led to the description and revival of several new families to more accurately convey this diversity.

Thus, the classification of the families of the Stomiiformes is:

Order Stomiiformes

- Family Vinciguerriidae Chang et al. 2025 (lighthousefishes and stareyes)
- Family Diplophidae Fowler, 1925 (portholefishes)
- Family Gonostomatidae Cocco, 1838 (bristlemouths)
- Family Sternoptychidae Duméril, 1805 (marine hatchetfishes)
- Family Yarrellidae Chang et al. 2025 (rendezvousfishes)
- Family Ichthyococcidae Chang et al. 2025 (fireflyfishes)
- Family Phosichthyidae Weitzman, 1974 (lightfishes)
- Family Stomiidae Bleeker, 1859 (dragonfishes)

The following fossil genera are also known:

- †Paravinciguerria Arambourg, 1955 (Late Cretaceous of Italy & Morocco)
- ?†Idrissia Arambourg, 1955 (Late Cretaceous to Paleogene)
