= List of fish named after animals =

This is a list of fish with common names that are based on the names of other animals. The names listed here may refer to single species, broader taxa (genera, families), or assortments of types. Where names are ambiguous, the various meanings should be listed here. A similar list including non-fish animals can be seen at the list of animals named after other animals.

== Named after fish ==
The following fish have common names that are based on the names of other fish:

- Carpsucker
- Cod icefish
- Eel cod
- Garfish
- Giant salmon carp
- Loach goby
- Mackerel shark
- Minnow-nase
- Northern trout gudgeon
- Pike eel
- Pike topminnow
- Pikeminnow
- Pike perch
- Salmon shark
- Salmon smooth-head
- Shark mackerel
- Trout barb
- Trout cod
- Trout-perch
- Trout sweetlips
- Wrasse bass

== Named after reptiles and amphibians ==
The following fish have common names that are based on the names of reptiles and amphibians:

- Alligator gar
- Alligatorfish
- Crocodile icefish
- Crocodile shark
- Crocodile toothfish
- Fintail serpent eel
- Frogfish
- Lizardfish
- Salamanderfish
- Sea toad
- Several species within family Ophichthidae known as snake eels, including:
  - Armless snake eel
  - Finny snake eel
  - Ordinary snake eel
  - Reptilian snake eel
  - Snaggle-toothed snake-eel
  - Stargazer snake eel
- Snake mackerel
- Toadfish
- Viperfish, genus Chauliodus, including:
  - Dana viperfish
  - Pacific viperfish
  - Sloane's viperfish

== Named after invertebrates ==
The following fish have common names that are based on the names of invertebrates:

- Anemonefish
- Butterfly ray
- Butterflyfish
- Coral grouper
- Earthworm eel
- Eastern mosquitofish
- (Western) mosquitofish
- Mussel blenny
- Scorpionfish
- Seamoth
- Shrimpfish
- Shrimp goby
- Snailfish
- Spiderfish
- Waspfish
- Several species within family Ophichthidae known as worm eels, including:
  - Angry worm eel
  - Diminutive worm eel
  - Leaden worm eel
- Wormfish

== Named after birds ==
The following fish have common names that are based on the names of birds:

- Avocet snipe eel
- Bird wrasse
- Blackline penguinfish
- Bobtail snipe eel
- Bombay duck (a lizardfish)
- Cockfish
- Cockatoo cichlid
- Cuckoo wrasse
- Eagle ray
- Goosefish
- Malawi hawk cichlid
- Hawkfish
- Parrotfish
- Peacock bass
- Peacock gudgeon
- Pelican eel
- Roosterfish
- Sea raven
- Sea robin
- Turkey moray
- Several fish within family Scorpaenidae known as turkeyfish:
  - Frillfin turkeyfish
  - Hawaiian turkeyfish
  - Shortfin turkeyfish
  - Twospot turkeyfish

== Named after mammals ==
The following fish have common names that are based on the names of mammals:

- Bat ray
- Various fish known as batfish:
  - Genus Platax, including:
    - Orbicular batfish
    - Pinnate batfish, dusky batfish, shaded batfish, or red-faced batfish (Platax pinnatus)
  - Family Ogcocephalidae, including:
    - Red-lipped batfish
- Various fish known as boarfish:
  - Family Caproidae
  - Several fish in family Pentacerotidae, including:
    - Striped boarfish
    - Giant boarfish or sowfish
    - Longfin boarfish
- Buffalofish
- Bull shark
- Bull trout
- Catfish
- Catshark
- Cowfish
- Cow shark
- Various fish known as dogfish:
  - Family Squalidae, the dogfish sharks, including:
    - Spiny dogfish
  - Several fish in family Scyliorhinidae, including:
    - Lesser spotted dogfish
    - Greater spotted dogfish or nursehound
  - Family Amiidae, the bowfin, including:
    - Amia calva
- Dolphinfish, genus Coryphaena, including:
  - Common dolphinfish
  - Pompano dolphinfish
- Various fish known as elephantfish:
  - Freshwater elephantfish
  - Marine elephantfish
- Flying fox
- Foxfish
- Goatfish
- Gopher rockfish
- Hog sucker
- Hogchoker
- Hogfish
- Various fish known as horse mackerel, including:
  - Atlantic horse mackerel
  - Cape horse mackerel
  - Greenback horse mackerel
  - Japanese horse mackerel
  - Yellowtail horse mackerel
- Horsefish
- Houndshark and barbeled houndshark
- Leopard flounder
- Leopard blenny
- Leopard bush fish
- Leopard dace
- Leopard darter
- Leopard eel
- Leopard moray eel
- Leopard whipray
- Lionfish
- Panther danio
- Panther grouper
- Various fish known as pigfish:
  - Family Congiopodidae
  - Red pigfish
- Ponyfish
- Porcupine ray
- Porcupine river stingray
- Porcupinefish
- Rabbitfish
- Ratfish
- Several species within genus Moxostoma known as redhorses, including:
  - Robust redhorse
- Sand tiger shark
- Seahorse
- Smooth-hound
- Splitlevel hogfish
- Squirrelfish
- Stonecat
- Tiger barb
- Tiger shark
- Tiger sorubim
- Various fish known as tigerfish:
  - Genus Hydrocynus
  - Several species in genus Datnioides, including:
    - Finescale tigerfish
    - Siamese tigerfish
- Tigerperch
- Weasel shark
- Whale catfish
- Whalefish
- Whale shark
- Wolffish or sea wolves, family Anarhichadidae, including:
  - Northern wolffish
  - Atlantic wolffish
  - Spotted wolffish
  - Bering wolffish
  - Wolf eel
- Wolf herring
- Zebra bullhead shark
- Zebra danio
- Zebrafish
- Zebra loach
- Zebra moray
- Zebra oto
- Zebra pleco (a catfish)
- Zebra shark
- Zebra tilapia

== Named after mythical animals ==
The following fish have common names that are based on the names of mythical animals(not listed here is the serpent eel):

- Bigfoot dwarfgoby
- Chimaera
- Various fish known as dragonfish:
  - Several species in family Pegasidae, including:
    - Little dragonfish
    - Pegasus laternarius, the brick seamoth, also known as the long-tailed dragonfish, pelagic dragonfish, or winged dragonfish
  - Family Stomiidae, the barbeled dragonfishes, including:
    - Scaly dragonfish
    - Black dragonfish
    - Broomfin dragonfish
    - Deepsea dragonfish
    - Longbarb dragonfish
    - Longfin dragonfish
    - Scaleless dragonfish
    - Smalltooth dragonfish
    - Threadfin dragonfish
    - Threelight dragonfish
- Leafy seadragon
- Sphinx blenny
- Sphinx dragonet
- Unicorn grenadier
- Various fish known as unicornfish:
  - Unicorn crestfish
  - Several species in genus Naso, including:
    - Whitemargin unicornfish
    - Humpback unicornfish
    - Short-nosed unicornfish
    - Bluetail unicornfish
- Weedy seadragon

== Named after two animals ==
The following fish have common names that are based on the names of two different animals:

- Avocet snipe eel
- Cockatoo waspfish
- Coral catshark
- Coral hawkfish
- Coral hind
- Coral scorpionfish
- Coral toadfish
- Crocodile snake eel
- Eel catfish
- Giraffe seahorse
- Hedgehog seahorse
- Leopard catshark
- Leopard chimaera
- Leopard coralgrouper
- Leopard toadfish
- Oyster toadfish
- Pony toadfish
- Raccoon butterflyfish
- Striped eel catfish
- Tiger shovelnose catfish
- Tiger snake eel
- Zebra lionfish or zebra turkeyfish (Dendrochirus zebra)
- Zebra seahorse

== Named after parts of animals ==
The following fish have common names which are based on specific body parts of other animals:

- Bullhead minnow
- Bullhead shark
- Bullhead triplefin
- Various sculpins and catfish known as bullhead
- California sheephead
- Cownose ray
- Duckbill
- Duckbill catfish
- Eeltail catfish
- Elephantnose fish
- Foxface
- Harelip sucker
- Horseface unicornfish
- Leopard-spotted goby
- Leopard-spotted swellshark (a catshark)
- Monkeyface eel
- Rattail
- Sheepshead
- Sheepshead porgy
- Sheepshead minnow
- Snakehead
- Tiger tail seahorse

== See also ==
- List of common fish names
