= Scaleless dragonfish =

Scaleless dragonfish may refer to:

- Bathophilus nigerrimus, a species of the genus Bathophilus, barbeled dragonfishes
- Chirostomias pliopterus, a species of barbeled dragonfish found in the Atlantic Ocean
- Leptostomias gladiator, a species of barbeled dragonfish found worldwide
- Eustomias schmidti, a type of dragonfish
- Melanostomias bartonbeani, a species of the genus Melanostomias, barbeled dragonfishes

== See also ==
- Stomiidae, a family of deep-sea ray-finned fish
- Bathophilus vaillanti
- Eustomias enbarbatus
- Flagellostomias boureei, a species of barbeled dragonfish found in the ocean depths worldwide
- Grammatostomias flagellibarba, a species of barbeled dragonfish
