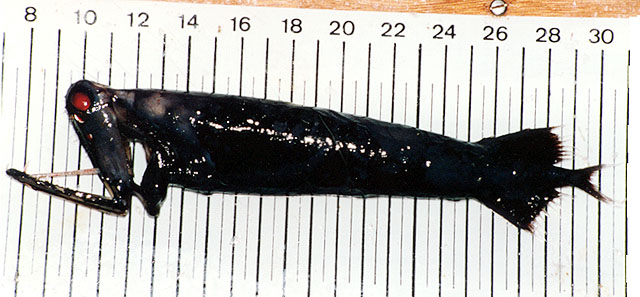

Conservation status
- Least Concern (IUCN 3.1)

Scientific classification
- Kingdom: Animalia
- Phylum: Chordata
- Class: Actinopterygii
- Division: Teleostei
- Order: Stomiiformes
- Family: Stomiidae
- Genus: Malacosteus
- Species: M. niger

Binomial name
- Malacosteus niger Ayres, 1848

Synonyms
- Malacosteus choristodactylus Vaillant, 1888; Malacosteus danae Regan & Trewavas, 1930; Malacosteus indicus Günther, 1878

= Malacosteus niger =

Species of fish

Full body illustration of M.niger

Malacosteus niger, commonly known as the stoplight loosejaw, is a species of deep-sea fish. Some additional common names for this species include: northern stoplight loosejaw, lightless loosejaw, black loosejaw, and black hinged-head. It belongs to the family Stomiidae, or dragonfishes. It is among the top predators of the open mesopelagic zone, and inhabits the mesopelagic and bathypelagic zones. M. niger is a circumglobal species, which means that it inhabits waters ranging from the tropics to the subarctics. Not many studies have been conducted on its feeding habits, but recent research suggests that M. niger primarily feed on calanoid copepods which is a form of zooplankton. Indeed, it appears that M. niger primarily prey on zooplankton despite its apparent morphological adaptations for the consumption of relatively large prey. Another unique adaptation for this species is its ability to produce both red and blue bioluminescence. Most deep sea species aren't capable of producing red bioluminescence. This is advantageous because most other species cannot perceive red light, therefore allowing M. niger to camouflage part of itself to its prey and predators.

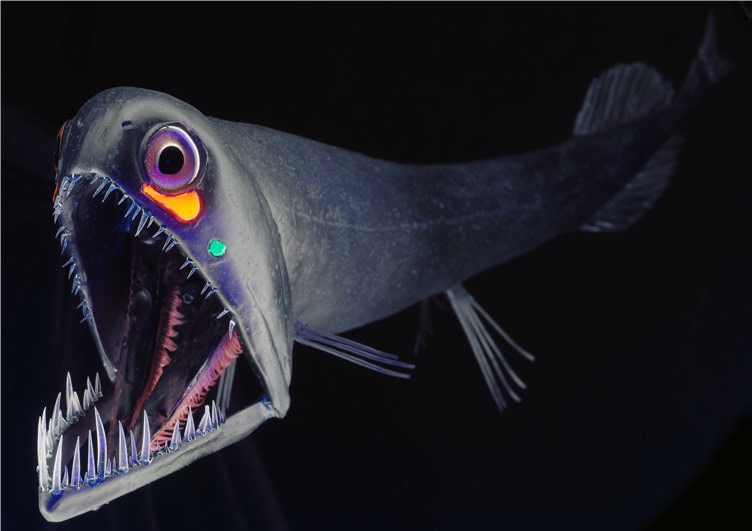
An animated image of Malacosteus niger.

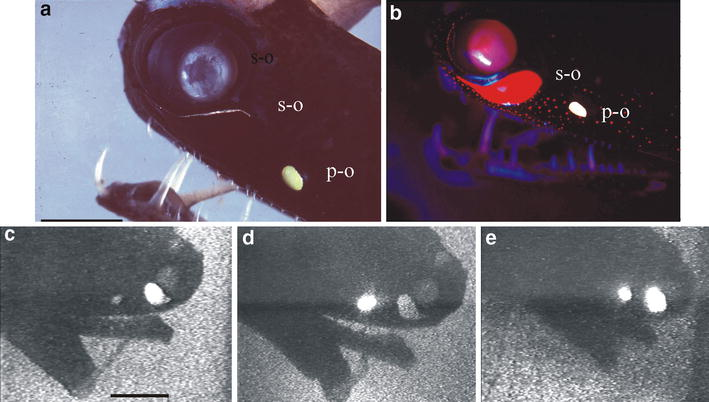
Flashing of photophores of Malacosteus niger, showing red fluorescence modifying the bioluminescence

== Anatomy and physiology ==
=== Visual system ===
Malacosteus niger has yellow lenses that are believed to improve the functionality of the perception of their red bioluminescence. M. niger has adapted a retinal structure of "ten layer elements," similar to those found in surface-level species and other shallow-water living species — which also perceive red light. Its retina is made up entirely of rods and no cones, with rhodopsin/porphyropsin pairs and a single opsin bound to some of its photoreceptors, which provide visual sensitivity up to 517-541 nm (this falls within the wavelength of red light). Most deep-sea fish have a single visual pigment maximally sensitive at short wavelengths, approximately matching the spectrum of both downwelling sunlight and bioluminescence. For comparison, other red light producing stomiids, such as Aristostomias and Pachystostomias, have a third pigment which allows them to perceive light up to 588 nm and 595 nm respectively. The yellow lens reduce the amount of blue light that reaches the retina and increases sensitivity to longer wavelengths, which benefits M. niger and its red bioluminescence.

Yellow lens have also been identified in Echiostoma, which also produces red bioluminescence.

=== Morphology ===
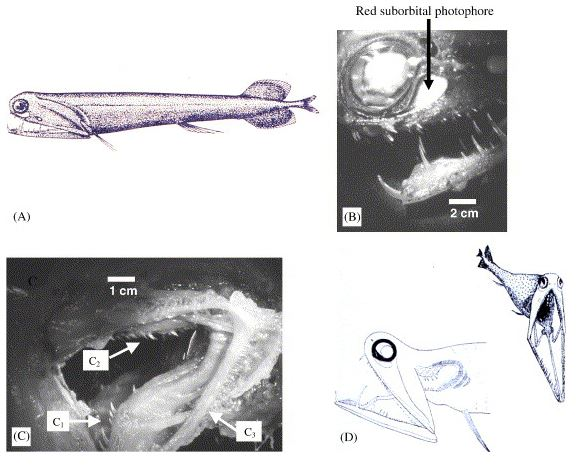
Images showing morphological characteristics of Malacosteus niger.

Malacosteus niger has one of the largest relative gapes of any fish with the lower jaw being approximately one-quarter of the fishes length (Figure A). It has enlarged fangs the curve back into its mouth to prevent its prey from escaping its grip (Figure B). M. nigers is unique in that it does not contain gill rakers or gill teeth which is typically found in carnivorous fish species (Figure C). The anterior vertebrae appear to be unossified which enables the fish to "throw back its head" to take on relatively large prey. Lastly, M. nigers lacks skin between its mandibular rami (no "floor" in its mouth) which allows it to consume bigger prey species (Figure D). (Refer to image on right hand side of webpage). The lack of a floor of the oral cavity allows for decreased resistive forces which allows M. niger to close its mouth rapidly and easily trap its prey. This adaptation also minimizes the amount of energy required for M. niger to close its mouth, thus permitting it to quickly latch onto fast-swimming prey.

The postorbital photophore in this species is larger than in M. australis. It also differs in lateral photophore count, as well as in morphological characters. The maximum known length is 25.6 cm (10.1 in). Its specific epithet niger is Latin for "black".

== Ecological and geographical distribution ==
Malacosteus niger is a circumglobal species and has a large geographic range. It can typically be found from the Arctic latitudes of 66° North and from 30° South in the Southern Hemisphere. While M. niger is found throughout the world, it appears to be widely distributed and found often in the Eastern Central Atlantic Ocean. M. niger does not participate in dial vertical migration, and is known to have a vertical range from 500 meters to 2500 meters (1640-8202ft), specimens of M.niger seem to be most frequently captured between 700 meters to 1500 meters (2296 to 4921ft). Interestingly, it is believed to be the only member of the stomiidae family that does not go through diel/vertical migration, which means that it does not migrate up to shallower waters at night like other deep-sea fish species.

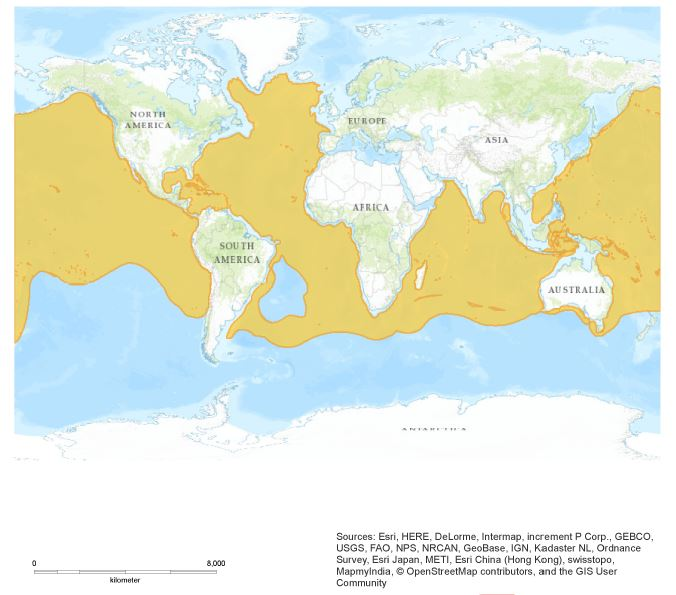
Worldwide distribution of Malacosteus niger

=== Diet ===
While the morphology of M. niger with huge fangs and an enormous gape is typical for its family and suggests adaptations to piscivory, its diet in fact contains a substantial proportion of zooplankton. Some of its documented prey include calanoid copepods, micronekton, decapod shrimps, and other decapods. M. niger digests its prey within a diel cycle, meaning the copepods it consumes at nighttime are digested by the afternoon the following day, which requires it to be constantly feeding on these small prey to sustain its energy. It has been recorded that copepods make up around 69%-83% of M. niger's diet. This suggests that availability of large prey at these depths is often limited. It is suggested that its dominant feeding mode is searching for zooplanktonic prey (copepods in particular) using bioluminescence to illuminate a small search area, since M. niger experiences infrequent encounters with larger prey items. Current research suggests that M. niger has adopted this unique feeding habit in association with the abundance of prey. Recent studies in the eartern Gulf of Mexico indicate that large calanoid copepods are three orders of magnitude more abundant than either fish or shrimp. More research is needed within different regions to confirm this hypothesis. It is suggested that its dominant feeding mode is searching for zooplanktonic prey (copepods in particular) using bioluminescence to illuminate a small search area, with infrequent encounters with larger prey items. The likely origin of the pigment necessary for detecting its long wavelength bioluminescence, a chlorophyll derivative, is the copepods themselves.

== Red bioluminescence ==
Malacosteus niger's unique adaptation of producing red bioluminescence is only found in two other deep-sea dwelling creatures, Aristostomias and Pachystomias. This rare form of bioluminescence can reach up to 700 nm in the deep-sea and cannot be perceived by green and blue bioluminescent organisms, thus granting M. niger a considerable advantage while hunting for food. Other deep-sea fish capable of detecting far-red bioluminescence, including Aristostomias and Pachystomias are able to do so using visual pigments. M. niger lacks these same long-wave pigments, and instead increases its sensitivity to red light using a chlorophyll-derived photosensitizer.

Malacosteus Niger has a tear-drop shaped, dark brown, suborbital photophore which is used to emit red light at an emission maxima of 710 nanometers. Removal of the top brown photophore layer causes a shift of the emission spectra to shorter wavelengths of around 650 nanometers. The photophores contain red-fluorescent material which is made to fluoresce via energy transfer from chemical reactions. Control of the photophore is maintained via innervation through branches of the fifth cranial nerve and this photophore. It is reported to be controlled independently of the postorbital blue photophore and has been noted to fluoresce for longer durations. The photophore is composed of a large pigmented sac containing a mass of scarlet gland cells. A thick, reflective layer lines the pigment sac, with occasional strands of reflective tissue running through the glandular core of the photophore. The outer layer is composed of large epithelial cells which merge into an inner, darker stained layer. The presumed function of this layer is to provide the brown layer through which fluorescence is filtered. The cells of the glandular core are characterized by a dense rough endoplasmic reticulum.
