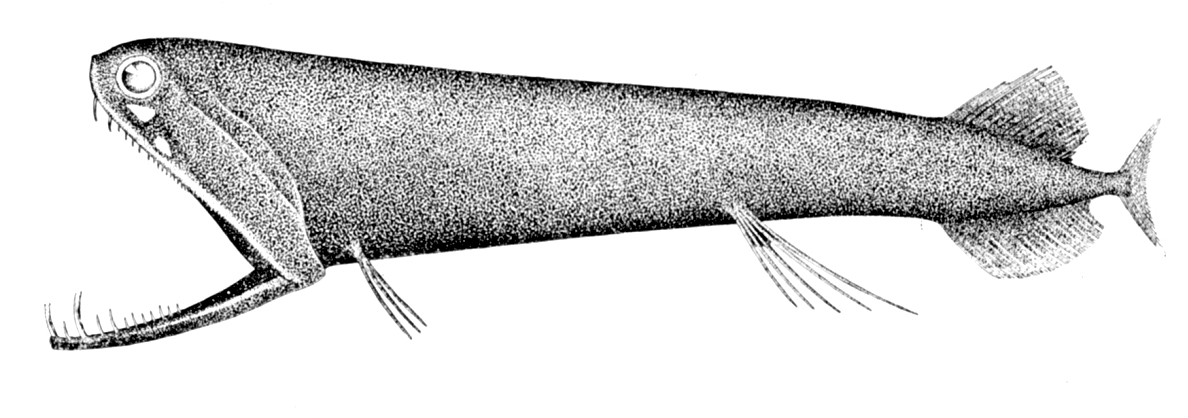
- Illustration of a stoplight loosejaw

Scientific classification
- Kingdom: Animalia
- Phylum: Chordata
- Class: Actinopterygii
- Division: Teleostei
- Order: Stomiiformes
- Family: Stomiidae
- Subfamily: Malacosteinae
- Genus: Malacosteus; Ayres, 1848

= Stoplight loosejaw =

Genus of fishes

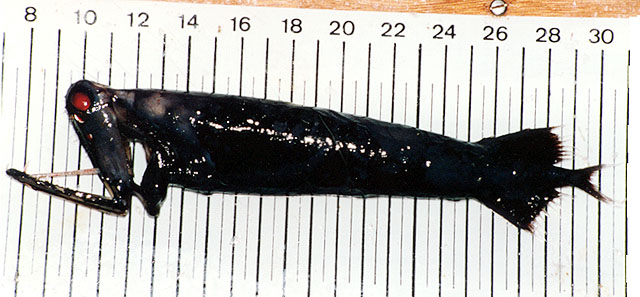
Northern stoplight loosejaw, Malacosteus niger, caught off Newfoundland

The stoplight loosejaws are small, deep-sea dragonfishes of the genus Malacosteus, classified either within the subfamily Malacosteinae of the family Stomiidae, or in the separate family Malacosteidae. They are found worldwide, outside of the Arctic and Subantarctic, in the mesopelagic and bathypelagic zones, below a depth of 500 meters (1,600 feet). This genus once contained three nominal species: M. niger (the type), M. choristodactylus, and M. danae, with the validity of the latter two species being challenged by different authors at various times. In 2007, Kenaley examined over 450 stoplight loosejaw specimens and revised the genus to contain two species, M. niger and the new M. australis.

Malacosteus and the related genera Aristostomias, Chirostomias and Pachystomias are the only fishes that produce red bioluminescence. As most of their prey organisms are not capable of perceiving light at those wavelengths, this allows Malacosteus to hunt with an essentially invisible beam of light. Furthermore, Malacosteus is unique amongst animals in using a chlorophyll derivative to perceive red light. The name Malacosteus is derived from the Greek malakos meaning "soft" and osteon meaning "bone". Another common name for these fishes is "rat-trap fish", from the unusual open structure of their jaws.

== Species ==
There are currently two recognized species in this genus:

- Malacosteus australis Kenaley, 2007 (Southern stoplight loosejaw)
- Malacosteus niger Ayres, 1848 (Northern stoplight loosejaw)

== Distribution and habitat ==
These fishes have a wide distribution in all oceans: M. niger is found between 66° N and 33° S, except for the Mediterranean Sea, while M. australis is found in the southern transition zone between 25° and 45° S, where it is bound by the Antarctic Circumpolar Current. M. niger appears to be replaced by M. australis south of 30° S, while M. australis does not occur north of that latitude outside of the Indian Ocean and the Indo-Australian Archipelago. Both species are usually found below a depth of 500 meters (1,600 feet) in midwater, their range extends from the mesopelagic to bathypelagic zones, both species seem to have a maximum depth of 2500 meters (8202ft).They are the only known stomiids that do not seem to conduct diel vertical migrations.

== Description ==
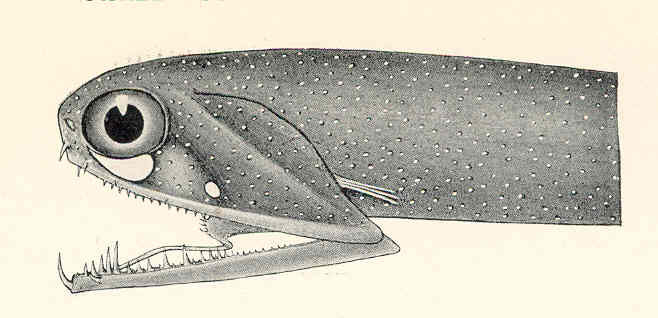
Closeup of jaw

Malacosteus has an elongated body with short, blunt snouts and large eyes that face forward, granting binocular vision. Unlike other stomiids, it has a single round nostril on each side in front of the eye. Relative to its size, Malacosteus has one of the widest gapes of any fish, with a lower jaw measuring one-quarter of the fish's length. The lower jaw has no skin between the mandibular rami, and is attached only by the hinge and a protractor hyoideus. There are several large, fang-like teeth in the front of the jaws, followed by many small barbed teeth. There are several groups of pharyngeal teeth that serve to direct food down the esophagus.

The pectoral and pelvic fins are moderately long, containing 3–4 and 6 fin rays respectively. The dorsal and anal fins are placed far back on the body and contain 18–20 and 19–22 rays respectively. The caudal fin is small, with the lower lobe larger than the upper. There are three bioluminescent photophores near the eyes: beneath the eye is a large, teardrop-shaped suborbital photophore that emits red light. Behind it is an ovoid postorbital photophore that emits green light; this photophore is larger in males than females. These red and green photophores are evocative of traffic lights, hence the fish's common name. The third is tiny and round, located between the eye and the large red photophore. Several rows and clusters of blue photophores are present on the sides and belly. In addition, there are small photophores and accessory areas of white luminous tissue scattered over the head and body. The skin is thin and scaleless; the coloration is black.

== Biology and ecology ==
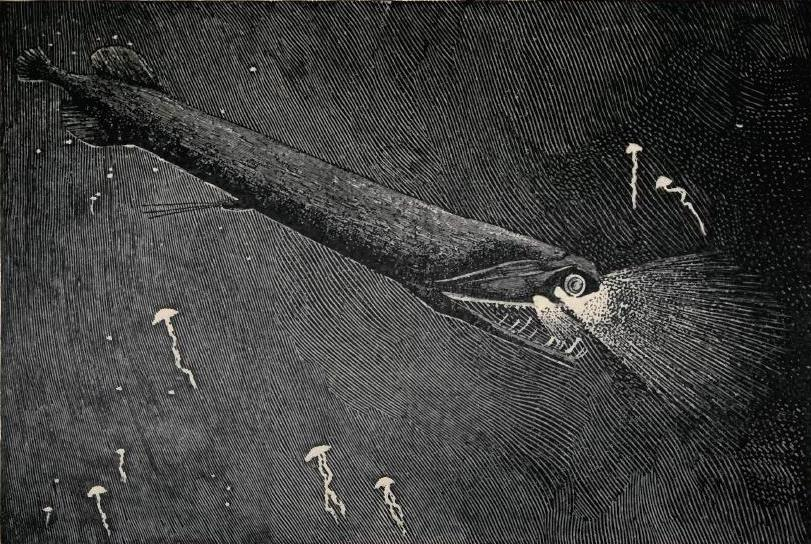
Malacosteus is thought to use its suborbital photophores like searchlights to find prey.

As long wavelengths of light (i.e. red) do not reach the deep sea from the surface, many deep-sea organisms are insensitive to red wavelengths, and so to these creatures, red-colored objects appear black. The red photophore of Malacosteus thus allows it to illuminate prey without being detected. These fishes exhibit a number of adaptations for feeding on large prey. The "open" structure of its jaws allows the fish to swing its entire head forward to grab prey from afar in addition to reducing water resistance, allowing them to be snapped shut more quickly, while large recurved teeth and powerful jaw muscles assure a secure hold. The connection between the head and the body is reduced, with unossified vertebrae, allowing the cranium to be tilted back and the jaws thrust forward for a wider gape. Finally, the gills are exposed to the outside, allowing the fish to continue respiring while slowly swallowing large prey.

However, contrary to its apparent morphological specialization, the diet of Malacosteus consists primarily of zooplankton, chiefly large calanoid copepods, with smaller numbers of krill, shrimps, and fishes. It is yet unclear how Malacosteus captures such small planktonic prey given the open structure of its mouth. The unexpected diet of Malacosteus is theorized to be a result of the small volumes that it searches for food, in which large prey items are rare. The rapid attenuation of red light in sea water gives Malacosteus a shorter visual range than species that use blue light, and it does not migrate vertically into more productive waters like other stomiids. Therefore, its strategy may be one of "snacking" on copepods, which are three orders of magnitude more abundant than fishes at its native depths, in between larger meals.

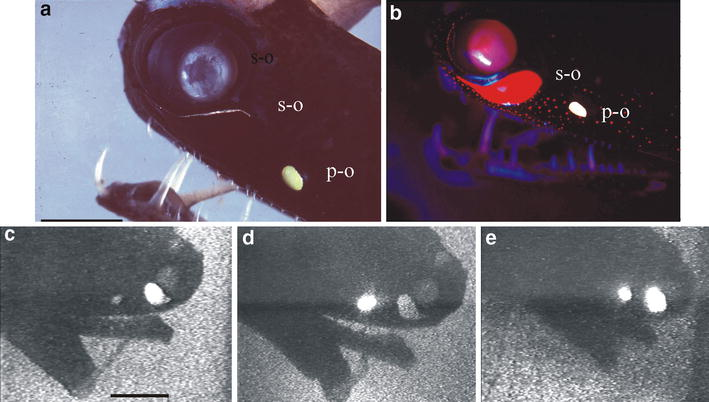
The red photophore of Malacosteus.

The other factor believed to be partly responsible for Malacosteus' diet is its unique visual system, which uses a derivative of chlorophyll as a photosensitizer that absorbs long-wave light (around 700 nm) and then indirectly stimulates the fish's two visual pigments, which have maximum absorbances at only 520 and 540 nm. No vertebrates are known to synthesize chlorophyll derivatives, and Malacosteus is believed to obtain these derivatives from the copepods it consumes. The red photophore of Malacosteus consists of a pigmented sac with a reflective inner lining and an internal mass of gland cells. Inside the gland cells, blue-green light is produced via the same chemical reaction found in other stomiids, which is then absorbed by a protein that fluoresces in a broad red band. This light is then reflected out through the photophore aperture, where it passes through a brown filter, yielding a far-red light with a maximum absorbance at 708 nm (almost infrared). In live fish, the suborbital and postorbital photophores both flash vigorously, the suborbital at a slower rate.
