= Grammatostomias circularis =

Conservation status
- Least Concern (IUCN 3.1)

Scientific classification
- Domain: Eukaryota
- Kingdom: Animalia
- Phylum: Chordata
- Class: Actinopterygii
- Order: Stomiiformes
- Family: Stomiidae
- Genus: Grammatostomias
- Species: G. circularis

Binomial name
- Grammatostomias circularis Morrow, 1959

Species of fish

Grammatostomias circularis is a species of barbeled dragonfish in the family Stomiidae. The species has been observed in the Atlantic Ocean, and fully-grown members of the species can reach a maximum length of 13.6 centimeters.
