= Odontostomias masticopogon =

Conservation status
- Least Concern (IUCN 3.1)

Scientific classification
- Kingdom: Animalia
- Phylum: Chordata
- Class: Actinopterygii
- Order: Stomiiformes
- Family: Stomiidae
- Genus: Odontostomias
- Species: O. masticopogon

Binomial name
- Odontostomias masticopogon Norman, 1930

Species of fish

Odontostomias masticopogon is a species of barbeled dragonfish in the genus Odontostomias. The species has been documented in the eastern Atlantic Ocean, and fully-grown members of the species can reach a maximum length of ~20 centimeters.
