= Grammatostomias ovatus =

Conservation status
- Data Deficient (IUCN 3.1)

Scientific classification
- Kingdom: Animalia
- Phylum: Chordata
- Class: Actinopterygii
- Order: Stomiiformes
- Family: Stomiidae
- Genus: Grammatostomias
- Species: G. ovatus

Binomial name
- Grammatostomias ovatus Prokofiev, 2014

Species of fish

Grammatostomias ovatus is a species of barbeled dragonfish in the family Stomiidae. The species is distributed across the Atlantic Ocean, and fully-grown females can reach a maximum length of 5.6 centimeters.
