= Neonesthes microcephalus =

Conservation status
- Least Concern (IUCN 3.1)

Scientific classification
- Kingdom: Animalia
- Phylum: Chordata
- Class: Actinopterygii
- Order: Stomiiformes
- Family: Stomiidae
- Genus: Neonesthes
- Species: N. microcephalus

Binomial name
- Neonesthes microcephalus Norman, 1930

Species of fish

Neonesthes microcephalus is a species of barbeled dragonfish in the genus Neonesthes. The species has been observed in the Pacific, Atlantic and Indian oceans, and fully-grown members of the species can reach a maximum length of ~17.2 centimeters.
