= Opostomias mitsuii =

Conservation status
- Least Concern (IUCN 3.1)

Scientific classification
- Kingdom: Animalia
- Phylum: Chordata
- Class: Actinopterygii
- Order: Stomiiformes
- Family: Stomiidae
- Genus: Opostomias
- Species: O. mitsuii

Binomial name
- Opostomias mitsuii Imai, 1941

Species of fish

Opostomias mitsuii, known informally as the Pitgum lanternfish, is a species of deep-sea ray-finned fish in the family Stomiidae. The species has been documented in the Pacific Ocean, and fully-grown members of the species can reach a maximum length of ~36 centimeters.
