= Odontostomias micropogon =

Conservation status
- Least Concern (IUCN 3.1)

Scientific classification
- Kingdom: Animalia
- Phylum: Chordata
- Class: Actinopterygii
- Order: Stomiiformes
- Family: Stomiidae
- Genus: Odontostomias
- Species: O. micropogon

Binomial name
- Odontostomias micropogon Norman, 1930

Species of fish

Odontostomias micropogon is a species of barbeled dragonfish in the genus Odontostomias. The species has been documented in the eastern Atlantic Ocean off the coast of Senegal, and fully-grown members of the species can reach a maximum length of ~29.5 centimeters.
