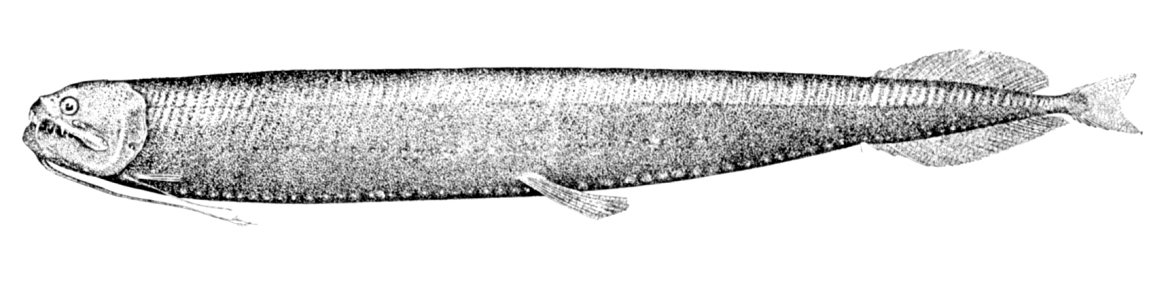

Scientific classification
- Kingdom: Animalia
- Phylum: Chordata
- Class: Actinopterygii
- Division: Teleostei
- Order: Stomiiformes
- Family: Stomiidae
- Genus: Opostomias
- Species: O. micripnus

Binomial name
- Opostomias micripnus (Günther, 1878)

Synonyms
- Echiostoma micripnus Günther, 1878; Opostomias gibsonpacei Barnard, 1948

= Opostomias micripnus =

Species of fish

Opostomias micripnus, commonly known as the obese dragonfish, is a species of deep-sea ray-finned fish of the family Stomiidae found in the Atlantic, Indian, and Pacific oceans. The species was described in 1878 by Albert Günther.
