= Malacosteus australis =

Scientific classification
- Domain: Eukaryota
- Kingdom: Animalia
- Phylum: Chordata
- Class: Actinopterygii
- Order: Stomiiformes
- Family: Stomiidae
- Genus: Malacosteus
- Species: M. australis

Binomial name
- Malacosteus australis Kenaley, 2007

Synonyms
- Malacosteus choristodactylus Vaillant, 1888; Malacosteus danae Regan & Trewavas, 1930; Malacosteus indicus Günther, 1878

Species of fish

Malacosteus australis, the southern stoplight loosejaw, is a species of barbeled dragonfish. This species is mainly distinguished from Malacosteus niger by a smaller postorbital photophore in both sexes and lower numbers of lateral photophores. It also differs in having somewhat smaller jaws, a fleshy orbit, and several subtle morphological traits. The maximum known length is 253.2 mm. Its specific epithet comes from the Latin austral, meaning "southern". It is known for its red bioluminescence which helps M. australis visualize in the aphotic deep sea.

== Description ==
Malacosteus australis have long bodies with large eyes. The blunt and short snout has a single round nostril. This species has barbed, curved, knife-shaped teeth. They have thin, scaleless, black skin.

== Red light physiological adaptation ==
Malacosteus australis, along with three of the four loosejaw genera (Malacosteus, Pachystomias, and Aristostomias) have an adaptation to their accessory orbital photophore. Malacosteus have a large single tear-dropped size accessory light organ. Blue light travels furthest in the ocean, so because of this, most organisms have eyes adjusted to see blues and greens clearly, but cannot detect other colors very well or at all. This adaptation to the loosejaw genera allow these organisms to have red-light bioluminescence. An emission maxima above 515 (such as the M. australis's red light) is very rare. In the mesopelagic region, this red light is undetectable visually to all the other fish. Malacosteus uses a bacteriochlorophyll-based photosensitizer to be able to see long wavelengths.
