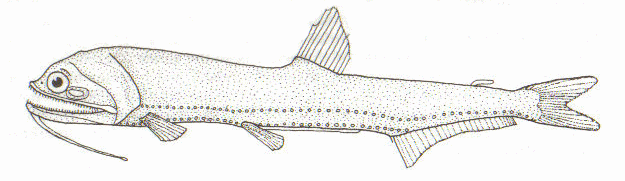
- Cape Snaggletooth(N. capensis)

Scientific classification
- Kingdom: Animalia
- Phylum: Chordata
- Class: Actinopterygii
- Order: Stomiiformes
- Family: Stomiidae
- Subfamily: Astronesthinae
- Genus: Neonesthes; Regan & Trewavas, 1929

= Neonesthes =

Genus of fishes

Neonesthes is a genus of barbeled dragonfish.

== Species ==
There are currently two recognized species in this genus:

- Neonesthes capensis (Gilchrist & von Bonde, 1924) (Cape snaggletooth)
- Neonesthes microcephalus Norman, 1930 (Smallhead snaggletooth)
