= Heterophotus =

Scientific classification
- Kingdom: Animalia
- Phylum: Chordata
- Class: Actinopterygii
- Order: Stomiiformes
- Family: Stomiidae
- Subfamily: Astronesthinae
- Genus: Heterophotus; Regan & Trewavas, 1929
- Species: H. ophistoma

Binomial name
- Heterophotus ophistoma Regan & Trewavas, 1929

Species of fish

Heterophotus ophistoma, the Wingfin snaggletooth, is a species of barbeled dragonfish found in oceans worldwide at depths of 790 to 1,420 metres (2,590 to 4,660 ft). This species grows to a length of 35.6 centimetres (14.0 in) SL. This species is the only known species in its genus.
