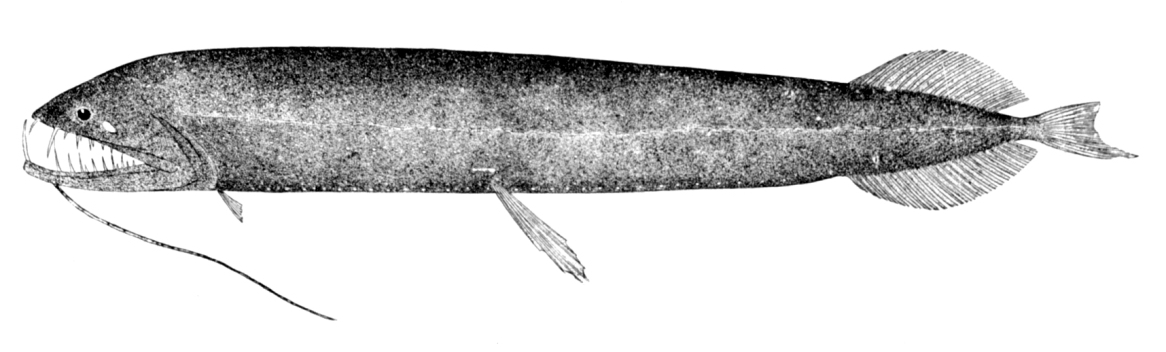
- Grammatostomias dentatus

Scientific classification
- Kingdom: Animalia
- Phylum: Chordata
- Class: Actinopterygii
- Order: Stomiiformes
- Family: Stomiidae
- Subfamily: Melanostomiinae
- Genus: Grammatostomias; Goode & T. H. Bean, 1896

Synonyms
- Lamprotoxus Holt & Bryne, 1913

= Grammatostomias =

Genus of fishes

Grammatostomias is a genus of barbeled dragonfishes found in the Atlantic Ocean.

== Species ==
There are currently 4 recognized species in this genus:

- Grammatostomias circularis Morrow, 1959
- Grammatostomias dentatus Goode & T. H. Bean, 1896
- Grammatostomias flagellibarba Holt & Byrne, 1910
- Grammatostomias ovatus Prokofiev, 2014
