= Eupogonesthes =

Scientific classification
- Kingdom: Animalia
- Phylum: Chordata
- Class: Actinopterygii
- Order: Stomiiformes
- Family: Stomiidae
- Subfamily: Astronesthinae
- Genus: Eupogonesthes; Parin & Borodulina, 1993
- Species: E. xenicus

Binomial name
- Eupogonesthes xenicus Parin & Borodulina, 1993

Species of fish

Eupogonesthes xenicus, the Exotic snaggletooth, is a species of barbeled dragonfish found in the eastern Indian Ocean. This species grows to a length of 11.4 centimetres (4.5 in) SL. This species is the only known species in its genus.
