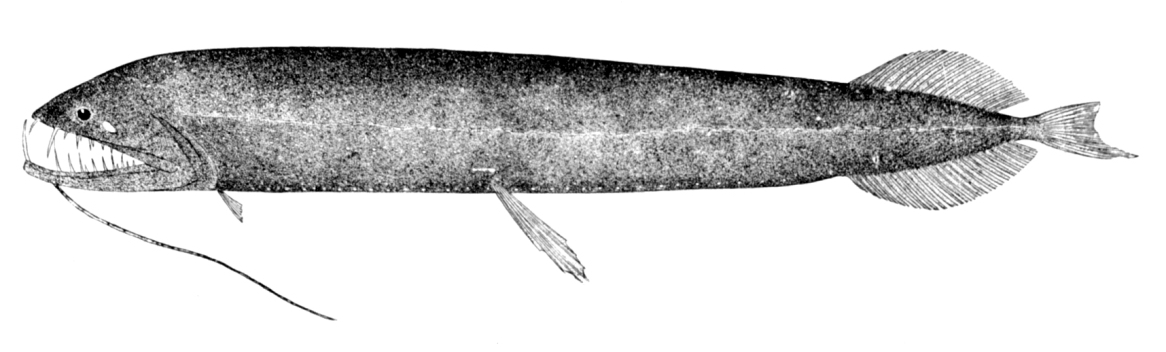

Conservation status
- Least Concern (IUCN 3.1)

Scientific classification
- Kingdom: Animalia
- Phylum: Chordata
- Class: Actinopterygii
- Order: Stomiiformes
- Family: Stomiidae
- Genus: Grammatostomias
- Species: G. dentatus

Binomial name
- Grammatostomias dentatus Goode & Bean, 1896

= Grammatostomias dentatus =

Species of fish

Grammatostomias dentatus is a species of barbeled dragonfish in the family Stomiidae. The species has been observed in the Atlantic Ocean west of Cape Verde, and fully-grown members of the species can reach a maximum length of 15.9 centimeters.
