= Odontostomias =

Scientific classification
- Kingdom: Animalia
- Phylum: Chordata
- Class: Actinopterygii
- Order: Stomiiformes
- Family: Stomiidae
- Subfamily: Melanostomiinae
- Genus: Odontostomias; Norman, 1930

Genus of fishes

Odontostomias is a genus of barbeled dragonfishes.

== Species ==
There are currently two recognized species in this genus:

- Odontostomias masticopogon Norman, 1930
- Odontostomias micropogon Norman, 1930
