= Grammatostomias flagellibarba =

Conservation status
- Least Concern (IUCN 3.1)

Scientific classification
- Domain: Eukaryota
- Kingdom: Animalia
- Phylum: Chordata
- Class: Actinopterygii
- Order: Stomiiformes
- Family: Stomiidae
- Genus: Grammatostomias
- Species: G. flagellibarba

Binomial name
- Grammatostomias flagellibarba Holt & Byrne, 1910

Synonyms
- Lamprotoxus phanobrochus Regan & Trewavas, 1930

Species of fish

Grammatostomias flagellibarba is a species of barbeled dragonfish. They live at depths of up to 1,500 m (5,000 ft) below the surface and usually measure up to 15.2 cm (6 in) in length.

== Type specimen and description ==
The type specimen was caught in a shrimp trawl by the Helga on 12 November 1909 at 51° 20' N, 11° 56' W, southwest of Ireland. They were trawling over bottom 736 fathoms (4416 ft) deep, but "the net never touched bottom, and probably did not go deeper than 700 fathoms" (4200 ft).

It is black and possesses a chin barbel that is about six times as long as the body, a large photophore behind and just below each eye, and two rows of very small photophores on each side of the body.

== Distribution ==
It is found in the North Atlantic, specifically off southern Ireland and in the Bay of Biscay.
