= Chirostomias =

Scientific classification
- Kingdom: Animalia
- Phylum: Chordata
- Class: Actinopterygii
- Division: Teleostei
- Order: Stomiiformes
- Family: Stomiidae
- Subfamily: Melanostomiinae
- Genus: Chirostomias; Regan & Trewavas, 1930
- Species: C. pliopterus

Binomial name
- Chirostomias pliopterus Regan & Trewavas, 1930

Species of fish

Chirostomias pliopterus is a species of barbeled dragonfish found in the Atlantic Ocean. This species grows to a length of 20.5 centimetres (8.1 in) SL. This species is the only described member of its genus. This scaleless dragonfish was also the first discovered life form to emit a red light, with the second being a siphonophore of the genus Erenna. Later, related Stomiid genera Aristostomias, Malacosteus and Pachystomias were also found to emit red light.
