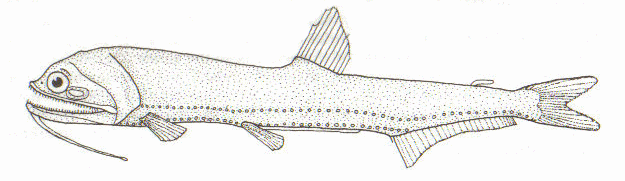
- Drawing by Dr Tony Ayling

Scientific classification
- Kingdom: Animalia
- Phylum: Chordata
- Class: Actinopterygii
- Order: Stomiiformes
- Family: Stomiidae
- Genus: Neonesthes
- Species: N. capensis

Binomial name
- Neonesthes capensis Gilchrist & von Bonde, 1924

Synonyms
- Neonesthes gnathopora Cohen, 1956; Neosthenes macrolychnus Regan & Trewavas, 1929; Neonesthes Nichols I Beebe, 1933

= Neonesthes capensis =

Species of fish

Neonesthes capensis, the Cape snaggletooth, is a lightfish of the family Stomiidae, found in all tropical and subtropical oceans except the north Pacific, at depths of between 70 and 1,500 meters. Its length is between 10 and 17 centimeters.

The anal fin is narrow but long, reaching almost to the caudal fin.
