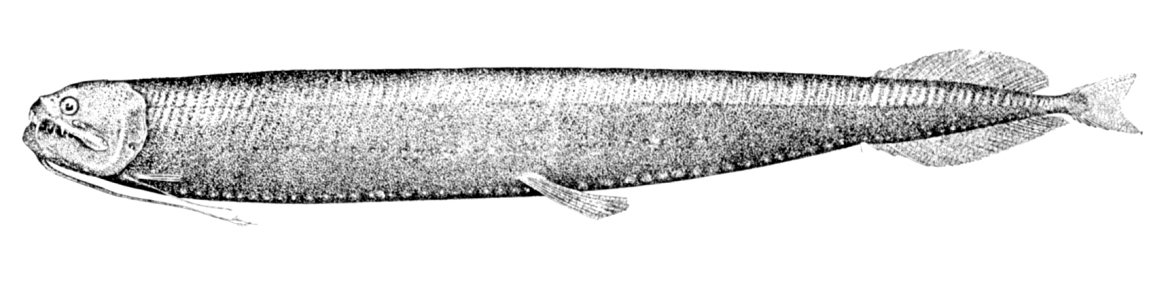
- Obese dragonfish (O. micripnus)

Scientific classification
- Kingdom: Animalia
- Phylum: Chordata
- Class: Actinopterygii
- Order: Stomiiformes
- Family: Stomiidae
- Subfamily: Melanostomiinae
- Genus: Opostomias; Günther, 1887

= Opostomias =

Genus of fishes

Opostomias is a genus of barbeled dragonfish.

== Species ==
There are currently two recognized species in this genus:

- Opostomias micripnus (Günther, 1878) (Obese dragonfish)
- Opostomias mitsuii S. Imai, 1941 (Pitgum lanternfish)
