= Trigonolampa =

Scientific classification
- Kingdom: Animalia
- Phylum: Chordata
- Class: Actinopterygii
- Order: Stomiiformes
- Family: Stomiidae
- Subfamily: Melanostomiinae
- Genus: Trigonolampa; Regan & Trewavas, 1930
- Species: T. miriceps

Binomial name
- Trigonolampa miriceps Regan & Trewavas, 1930

Species of fish

Trigonolampa miriceps, the threelight dragonfish, is a species of barbeled dragonfish found in the ocean depths to 1,860 metres (6,100 ft). This species grows to a length of 32 centimetres (13 in) SL. This species is the only known member of its genus.
