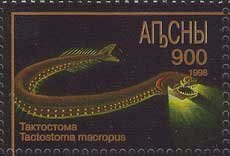

Scientific classification
- Kingdom: Animalia
- Phylum: Chordata
- Class: Actinopterygii
- Division: Teleostei
- Order: Stomiiformes
- Family: Stomiidae
- Subfamily: Melanostomiinae
- Genus: Tactostoma; Bolin, 1939
- Species: T. macropus

Binomial name
- Tactostoma macropus Bolin, 1939

= Tactostoma =

Species of fish

Tactostoma macropus, the longfin dragonfish, is a species of barbeled dragonfish found in the Pacific Ocean down to depths of 2,000 metres (6,600 ft). This species grows to a length of 34.3 centimetres (13.5 in) TL. This species is the only known species in the genus Tactostoma and belongs to the family Stomiidae, the barbeled dragonfishes. These fish are deep-sea pelagic predators and with 317 species of dragonfish they are one of the most speciated and most diverse deep-pelagic family of fish. With only 19 species off the coast of Northern America, Tactostoma macropus remains as one of the most commonly found Stomiidae in the Pacific Ocean.

The first individual taken as a specimen was caught off Monterey Bay in California and stored in the Natural History Museum of Standford University. This individual was caught and described by Rolf L. Bolin in 1938 when he had an opportunity to join the California State Division of Fish and Game for deep plankton tows. Since then, thousands of specimens have been collected, largely on the Oregon coast in the depths off the continental shelf. Although some research has been done on this species, lots of information remains uncertain and some information known is challenged in alternating research.

Morphology

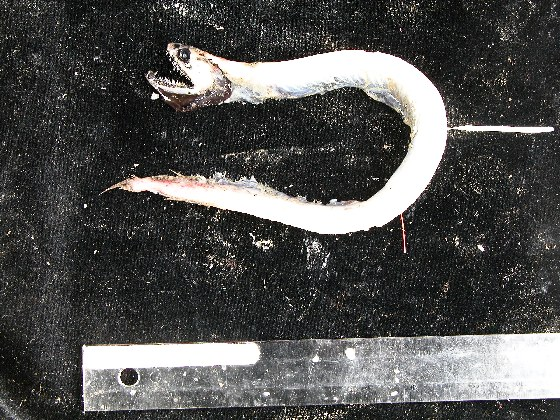
A dead specimen of Tactostoma macropus where the black coloring is lost, likely a result of preservation. The lack of coloration also has erased the photophores along the body. However, this image allows the shape of the mouth to be viewed along with the teeth.

The longfin dragonfish has a long and slender body plan with a small head and a slightly upwards turned mouth. With 14-18 soft rays, the dorsal fin lies closely in front of the tail fin and directly above the anal fin (19-22 soft rays), while the pelvic fins lie approximately a third of the way from the tail end. The tail fin is heterocercal with the lower lobe being slightly longer with larger rays. It has no pectoral fins.

Their long mouths are full of long, thin teeth, with more resting on the slightly larger bottom jaw than the top and an additional set of teeth on each side of their tongue. With their protruding bottom jaw, their jaw is only hinged with a posterior axis of rotation. Their specific organization of teeth is unique to this species, whereas other species within Stomiidae have fewer, more spread out teeth. They lack vomerine teeth along with parts of the skull that other fish in the family Stomiidae typically have. Under their mouth rests a singular barbel which is about as long as they are wide and emits bioluminescence, but, in some specimen, has been broken off.

Being a pelagic fish, it is nearly entirely black in color with dark grey color on the posterior of the lower jaw and like the rest of Stomiidae, is scaleless. They have relatively large eyes, accounting for about 20% of the head size. Additionally, below either of their large eyes are oval photophores, a structure responsible for bioluminescence. Down the length of their anguilliform bodies are two lines of smaller dots of photophores from behind the gills to the base of the tail. Photophores also dot the rays of the various fins of the fish.

For better images of Tactostoma macropus, live and wild specimen photos can be found on the Monterey Bay Aquarium Research Institute website.

Biology

While most deep-sea fish only have eyes sensitive to short wave blue light, the fish of Stomiidae have specialization to see red bioluminescence as well. The evolutionary benefit of seeing long wave red light has been discussed as a foraging mechanism. While many predators of the deep rely on blue light bioluminescence for luring prey in, Stomiidae (along with other a few other deep sea fish clades) produce red light bioluminescence to look for prey in the dark as most other fish, especially prey, cannot see the red light. Their large eyes make it apparent the energy they spend towards their vision, likely for seeing the red light they produce but also could be used for vertical migration or predator detection.

Distribution and Habitat

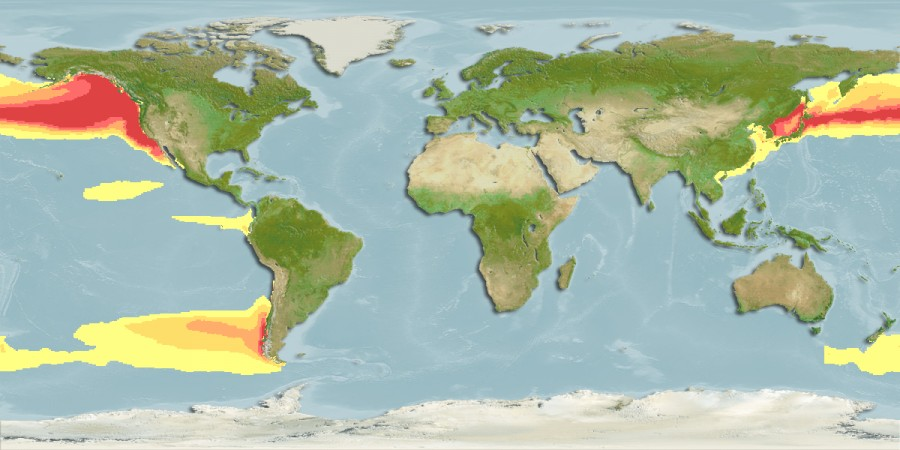
Assumed range of Tactostoma macropus, with a highlighted emphasis along the Northwest coast of Northern America.

Although found from Southern California to British Columbia, all the way to Japan and can be found down to Chile, but they are most commonly found in the subartic transitional waters of the North Pacific. They primarily live in the mesopelagic and bathypelagic areas of the ocean but some studies observe them surfacing at night to feed, thus ranging from depths of 2,000 meters to surface waters. In another survey however, they vertically ranged from 500 meters to 1000 meters. Both day and night abundance of these fish peaked at about 500 meters, however night catches tend to be significantly larger than those caught during the day, perhaps indicating smaller, juvenile fish do more migration feeding than adults.

Feeding

While some surface migration for feeding has been observed, their feeding primarily consists of other fish, crustaceans, copepods and various zooplankton. Small juveniles tend to eat krill while larger adults go after a more focused diet of fish, which provide larger prey. With their anguilliform body shape, longfin dragonfish are fast swimmers, however they tend to ambush or wait for unsuspecting prey instead of pursuing in a chase. While their blue bioluminescence assists in the luring of their prey, their red bioluminescence helps them forage and ambush prey. Their large, fang-like teeth also helps in caging larger fish in their mouths, opening up foraging for food in the deep to larger, more energy efficient prey.

Life History

Sexual maturity occurs in females at a length of about 30 centimeters, males reach about 27 centimeters, and they can have 24,000 – 66,000 eggs. Reproducing only occurs once a year for an individual. Spawning season happens mostly in months May to September, 150 to 300 meters offshore, and larvae are typically found in the closest 50 meters from the surface but can be found as deep as 200 meters. Timing and location relate to the temperature of the waters being warmer because of the month, depth and shoreline distance.

The life cycle of Stomiidae is as follows: egg, pre-larva, larva, post-larva, adolescent and adult. The younger generations, egg and larva, remain higher in the water column and larger adolescence and adults are only found in the upper column at night. Growth of longfin dragonfish has been measured from the comparison of otoliths of specimens, finding an average growth rate of 3 to 4 centimeters a year in length. With this growth rate, reproducing individuals are 6 years or older. The maximum lengths of either gender have also been estimated to females being 38 centimeters and males at 33 centimeters, indicative that females tend to be larger, although another study recorded males having an average larger size than females. In terms of weight to length ratios, fish below 22 centimeters remained at similar bodily proportions, but with fish above 22 centimeters, fish become progressively heavier in body. The oldest individual recorded was 8 years, but it is possible they could live much longer.

Genome

In 2018, research determined the complete mitochondrial genome of Tactostoma macropus; making it the third species from Stomiidae to be done so. This information assists in predicting the organization of phylogenies and understanding the ancestry, evolution and relationships of species. This study wanted to give attention to a rare fish from the deep-sea, giving information of 13 protein-coding genes, DNA length of 17 thousand basepairs and information on the RNA, all very similar to most other fish.

Conservation

Conservation status of longfin dragonfish is currently not listed as an endangered species, however there is minimal research being done with deep sea animal populations and very minimal information from the past decades unlike many of the currently considered endangered species. When using catch data from other deep sea fish, there has been a significant decline in numbers suggesting that extinction rates have reached the deep ocean. While this fish has no indication of declining numbers, there is also no indication of steady numbers.
