= Eustomias schmidti =

Scientific classification
- Kingdom: Animalia
- Phylum: Chordata
- Class: Actinopterygii
- Order: Stomiiformes
- Family: Stomiidae
- Genus: Eustomias
- Species: E. schmidti

Binomial name
- Eustomias schmidti Regan & Trewavas, 1930

Species of fish

Eustomias schmidti, more commonly known as the scaleless dragonfish, is one of the many species included in the family of Stomiidae. Despite its small size, the scaleless dragonfish is a dangerous predator in the deep oceanic waters that uses its self-generated light to attract its prey.

== Physical characteristics ==
=== Body ===
Eustomias schmidti has an elongated and slender body. The head is quite small with large jaws that are about the same length as the head. The jawbone has small, erect teeth standing in an anterior direction. Each Eustomias schmidti has 22–28 dorsal fins and 36–43 anal soft rays. This type of fish has no dorsal or anal spines. One of the defining characteristics of the genus Eustomias is the barbel. On the barbel of the Eustomias schmidti, it has three branches arising from the stem. The middle branch is stout and swollen with distal filaments that barely reach the barbel tip. The side branches taper and extend far beyond the end of the barbel, with an exception in smaller specimens. The terminal bulb is strongly constricted. One or more complex filaments rise from the region of constriction of the bulb.

Along the body, there are two prominent ventrolateral rows of photophores. In addition, there are many small photophores covering most of the body and head. The scaleless dragonfish has two pectoral finrays (bounded closely in a black membrane) and seven pelvic finrays.

At its first maturity level, the females reach 11–11.4 centimetres (4.3–4.5 in) whereas the males are slightly smaller and reach 10.3–11.3 cm (4.1–4.4 in). Overall, a scaleless dragonfish can reach to be 21.2 cm (8.3 in) during its lifetime.

=== Skin and color ===
It has no scales or hexagonal areas on its body. The scaleless fish's skin is usually black, sometimes iridescent silver, bronze, or green.

== Habitat ==
The Eustomias schmidti are mostly mesopelagic. Therefore, they are most commonly found in deep oceanic waters. During the day, they live in waters deeper than 500 metres (1,600 ft). During the night, some fish choose to migrate to near-surface waters.

== Diet ==
Their diet consists mainly of other mesopelagic fishes as well as some crustaceans.

== Distribution ==
The scaleless dragonfish occur in the Atlantic and Pacific oceans between 35–40° N and 30–35° S but are found mostly in boundary currents or equatorial water. Other areas include the Gulf of Mexico, Caribbean Sea, and the Indian Ocean.

Countries where Eustomias schmidti is found:

- Australia
- Canary Islands
- Hawaii
- Japan
- Madeira Islands
- Morocco
- Namibia
- New Zealand
- Papua New Guinea
- South Africa
- West Sahara

Ecosystems where Eustomias schmidti occurs:

- Bear Seamount
- Atlantic Ocean
- Benguela Current
- Canary Current
- Caribbean Sea
- East Central Australian Shelf
- Gulf of Mexico
- Indian Ocean
- Kuroshio Current
- New Zealand Shelf
- Pacific Ocean
- Southeast U.S. Continental Shelf
- Tasman Sea
