= Thysanactis =

Scientific classification
- Kingdom: Animalia
- Phylum: Chordata
- Class: Actinopterygii
- Order: Stomiiformes
- Family: Stomiidae
- Subfamily: Melanostomiinae
- Genus: Thysanactis; Regan & Trewavas, 1930
- Species: T. dentex

Binomial name
- Thysanactis dentex Regan & Trewavas, 1930

Species of fish

Thysanactis dentex, the Broomfin dragonfish, is a species of barbeled dragonfish found in the ocean depths from 100 to 1,000 metres (330 to 3,280 ft). This species grows to a length of 18.0 centimetres (7.1 in) SL. This species is the only known member of its genus.
