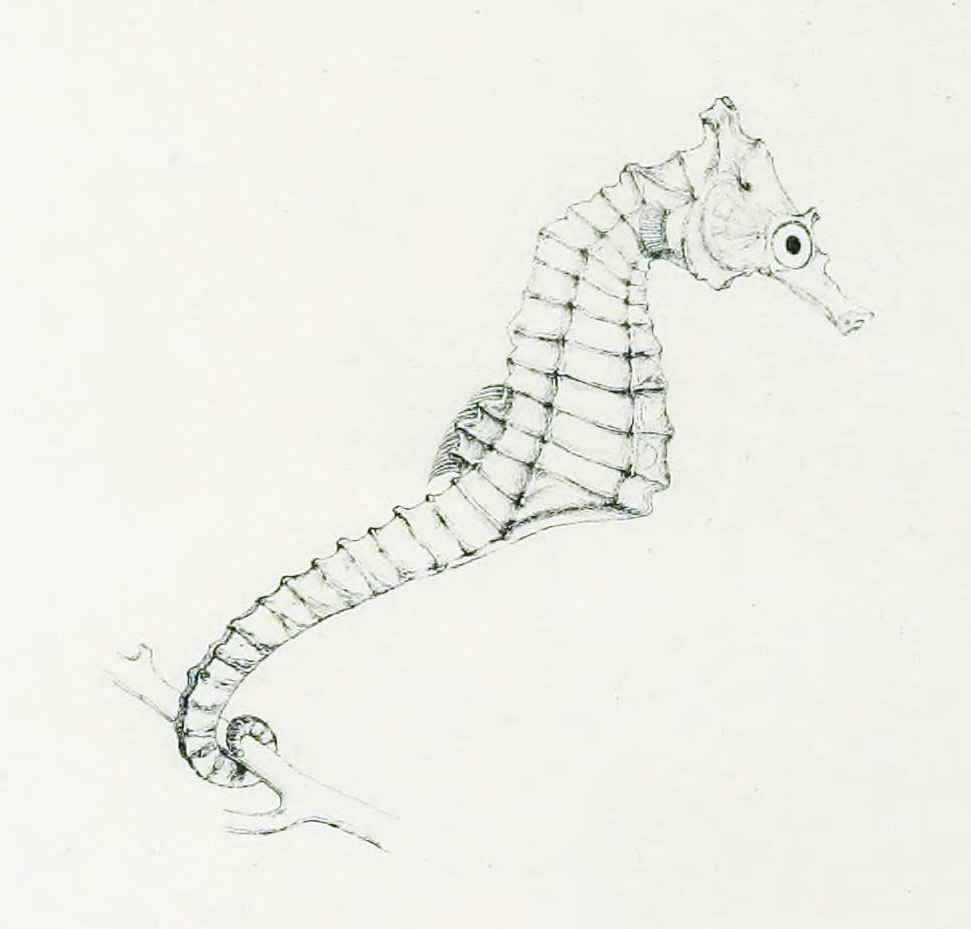

Conservation status
- Data Deficient (IUCN 3.1)
- CITES Appendix II (CITES)

Scientific classification
- Kingdom: Animalia
- Phylum: Chordata
- Class: Actinopterygii
- Order: Syngnathiformes
- Family: Syngnathidae
- Genus: Hippocampus
- Species: H. camelopardalis

Binomial name
- Hippocampus camelopardalis Bianconi, 1854

Synonyms
- Hippocampus subcoronatus Günther,1867

= Giraffe seahorse =

Species of fish

The giraffe seahorse (Hippocampus camelopardalis) is a species of fish of the family Syngnathidae. It is found in coastal waters off of the south and east coasts of Africa, from South Africa to Tanzania, and possibly north to Kenya. It lives in estuarine seagrass beds, algae beds, and shallow reefs to depths of 45 metres (148 ft), where it can grow to lengths of 10 centimetres (3.9 in). It is expected to feed on small crustaceans, similar to other seahorses. This species is ovoviviparous, with males carrying eggs in a brood pouch before giving birth to live young. Individuals are sexually mature at around 6.5 centimetres (2.6 in). Major threats to the species include habitat loss, coastal development and pollution, and overexploitation through bycatch. Some other threats include human use by drying out the seahorse for traditional medicine or as a curio.

The giraffe seahorse has dark spots across its body: one on the top of the coronet or crown of the seahorse's head and some on the dorso-lateral surface of the seahorse. Both genders have a prominent spine above the eye.
