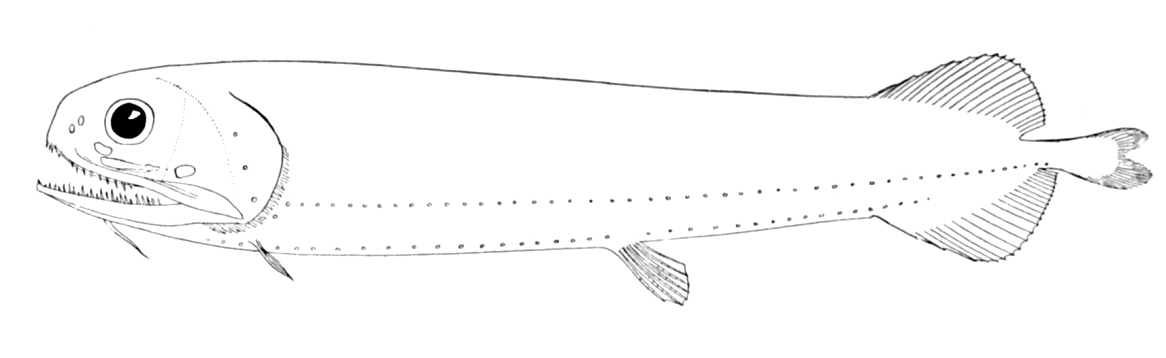

Scientific classification
- Kingdom: Animalia
- Phylum: Chordata
- Class: Actinopterygii
- Division: Teleostei
- Order: Stomiiformes
- Family: Stomiidae
- Subfamily: Melanostomiinae
- Genus: Pachystomias; Günther, 1887
- Species: P. microdon

Binomial name
- Pachystomias microdon (Günther, 1878)

= Pachystomias =

Species of fish

Pachystomias microdon, the smalltooth dragonfish, is a species of barbeled dragonfish found in the oceans at depths of from 660 to 4,000 metres (2,170 to 13,120 ft). This species grows to a length of 22.1 centimetres (8.7 in) SL. This species is the only known species in its genus.

== Red light bioluminescence ==
=== Production of far-red bioluminescence ===
Pachystomias is one of three deep-sea fish that can produce red light bioluminescence, along with Aristostomias, Chirostomias, and Malacosteus. In addition to producing blue light via postorbital photophores, Pachystomias also possess suborbital and preorbital cephalic photophores that are capable of producing far-red bioluminescence, with wavelength emissions of over 650 nm. Compared to other bioluminescent fish, Pachystomias has a uniquely large suborbital photophore, which extends from the orbit to the roof of the mouth, while the preorbital photophore is much smaller. The suborbital and preorbital organs have been observed to produce both bright flashes as well as steady glows.

=== Visual systems ===
Deep-sea fishes that are able to detect light typically have visual pigments sensitive to blue and green light, ranging from 470 to 490 nm. However, deep-sea loose-jawed dragonfish, including Pachystomias, are sensitive to long-wave light and are able to detect their own bioluminescence. Pachystomias has at least three long-wave shifted pigments that can detect wavelengths of up to 595 nm.

=== Adaptive significance ===
Pachystomias are able to both produce and see far-red wavelengths. Because the ability to detect red light is rare, it is thought that this adaptation could serve deep-sea loose-jawed dragonfish by acting as a prey-detection system, as well as for intraspecific communication.
