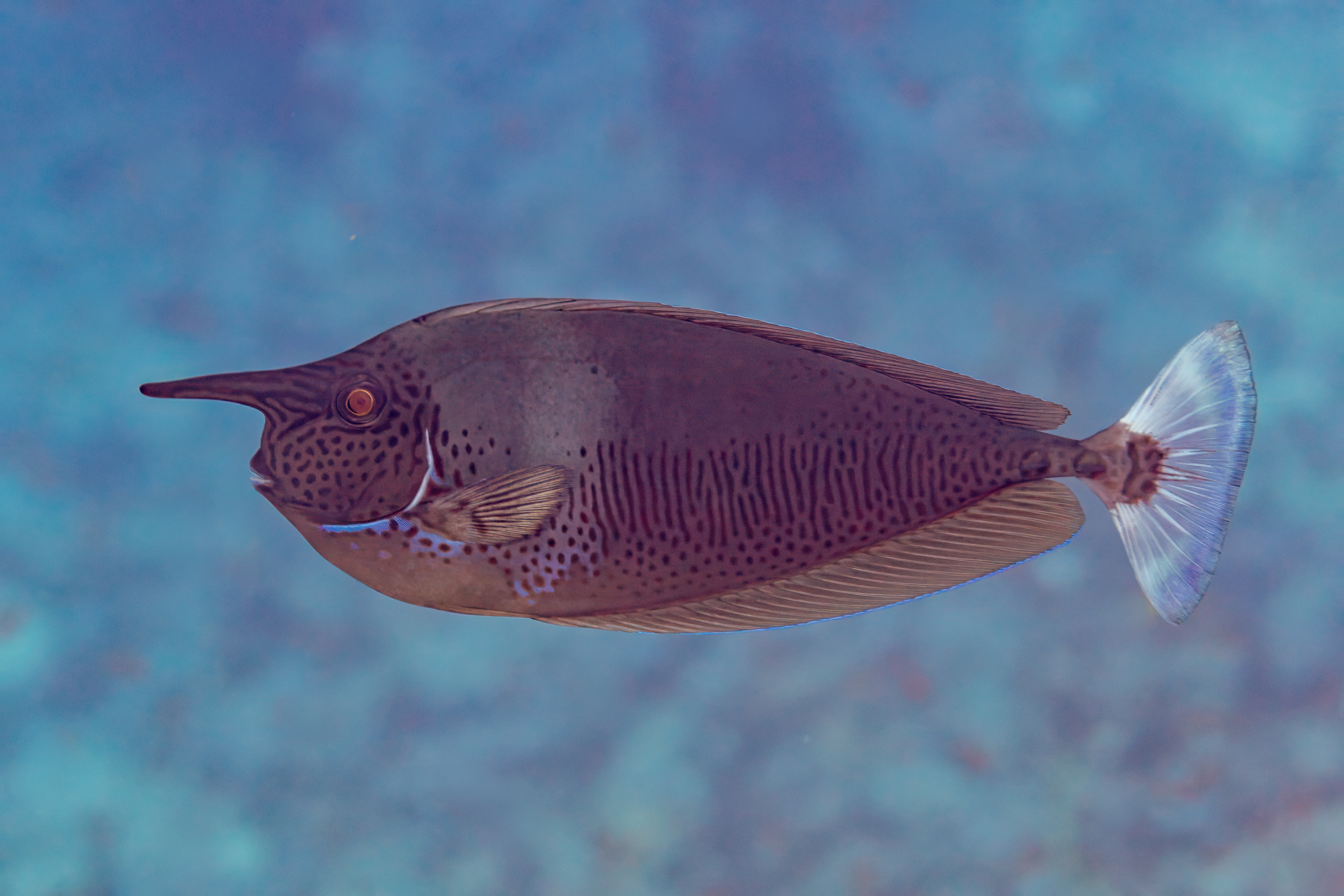
- Naso brevirostris at the French Polynesia

Conservation status
- Least Concern (IUCN 3.1)

Scientific classification
- Kingdom: Animalia
- Phylum: Chordata
- Class: Actinopterygii
- Division: Teleostei
- Order: Acanthuriformes
- Family: Acanthuridae
- Genus: Naso
- Subgenus: Naso
- Species: N. brevirostris

Binomial name
- Naso brevirostris (G. Cuvier, 1829)

Synonyms
- Cyphomycter coryphaenoides J. L. B. Smith, 1955; Naseus brevirostris Cuvier, 1829; Naseus brevirostris Valenciennes, 1835; Naso brevirostris (Valenciennes, 1835)

= Naso brevirostris =

Species of fish

Naso brevirostris, also known as the short-nosed unicornfish, spotted unicornfish, brown unicornfish, lined unicornfish, longnose surgeonfish, palefin unicornfish, paletail unicornfish, shorthorned unicornfish or shortsnouted unicornfish, is a species of marine ray-finned fish belonging to the family Acanthuridae, the surgeonfishes, unicornfishes and tangs. It occurs in the Indian Ocean and western Pacific Ocean.

== Taxonomy ==
Naso brevirostris was first formally described as Naseus brevirostris in 1829 by the French zoologist Georges Cuvier with its type locality not given but considered to be Indonesia. It is classified within the nominate subgenus of the genus Naso. The genus Naso is the only genus in the subfamily Nasinae in the family Acanthuridae.

== Etymology ==
Naso brevirostris has a specific name which means "short nose". This is an allusion to the shorter snout when compared to the type species of Naso, N. fronticornis.

== Distribution and habitat ==
Naso brevirostris is widespread throughout the Indian and Pacific Oceans, from the Red Sea south along the eastern coast of Africa as far as Durban in South Africa and eastward across the Indian Ocean into the Western Pacific Ocean, extending east to the Pitcairn Islands and the Hawaiian Islands, north to southern Japan and south to Australia. In Australia the distribution goes from Ningaloo Reef around the northern tropical coasts to the northern Great Barrier Reef and the Coral Sea as far south as Moreton Bay in Queensland, as well as in the region of Lord Howe Island in the Tasman Sea. In the eastern Pacific it is found around the Galápagos Islands. These fish live in lagoon and seaward reefs down to depths of 46 m (151 ft).

== Description ==
Naso brevirostris has 6 spines and between 27 and 29 soft rays supporting the dorsal fin while the anal fin is supported by 2 spines and 27 to 29 soft rays. The depth of the body fits into its standard length between roughly 2 and 2.7 times. The snout is very short in length and is very steep, almost vertical. Subadults and adults have long, tapering bony protuberances in front of their eyes which may extend past one's mouth by as much as the length of the head, first appearing as a bump in individuals of around 10 cm (3.9 in) total length. A pair of bony plates with a poorly developed keels are on each side of the caudal peduncle and the caudal fin varies from truncate to slightly rounded.

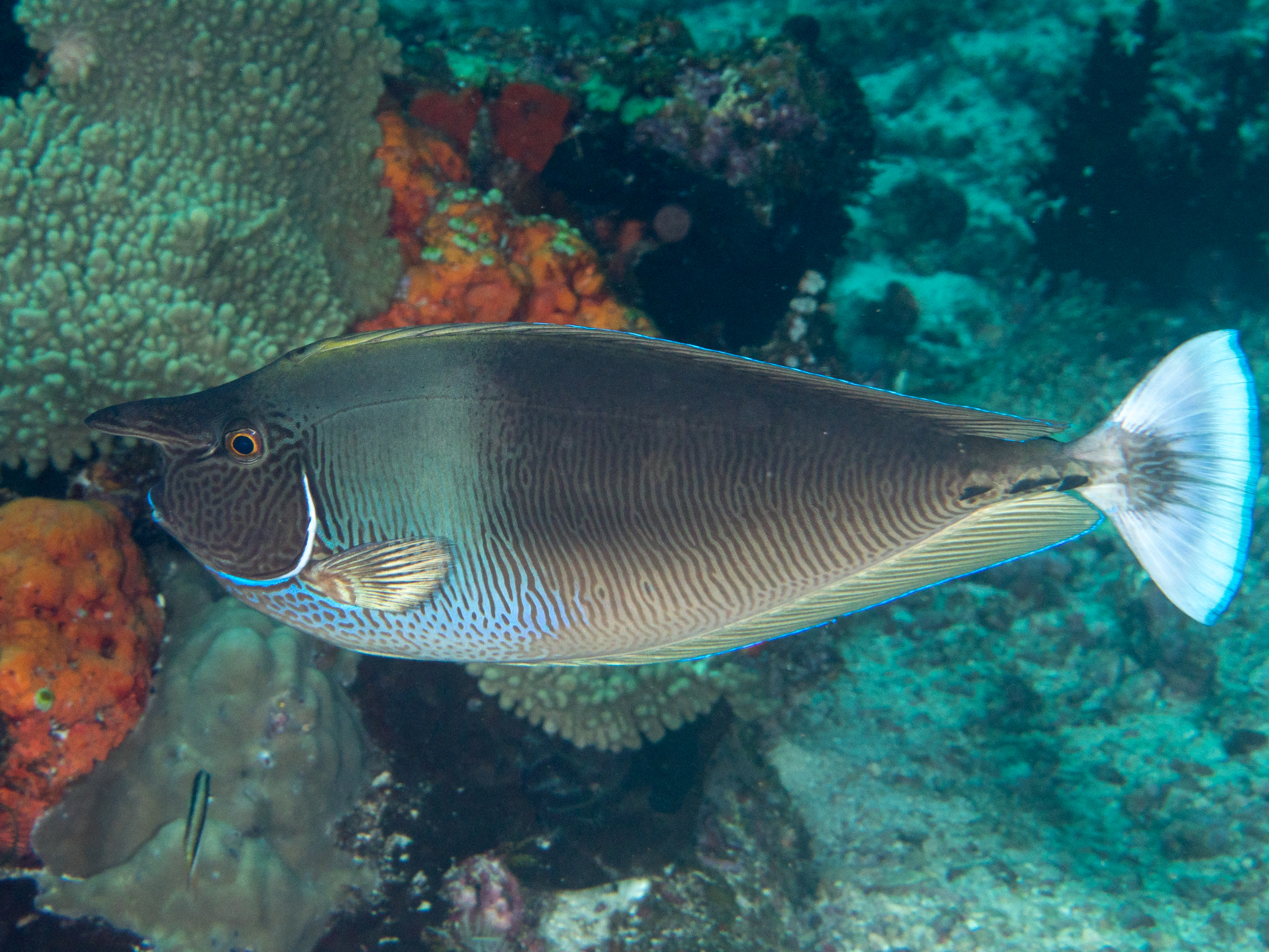
In Indonesia

The overall colour is light blueish-grey to olive-brown, although there is a colour phase where the front quarter of the body is pale with a clear demarcation from the remainder of the body. The middle of the flanks are marked with thin, vertical dark grey lines that break up into small spots on the lower body. The head is marked with small dark spots or by a lattice of lines. The protuberance is marked with diagonal black lines, the membrane of the operculum is white, the lips have pale blue edges and the caudal fin is largely whitish. This species has a maximum published total length of 60 cm (24 in).

== Biology ==
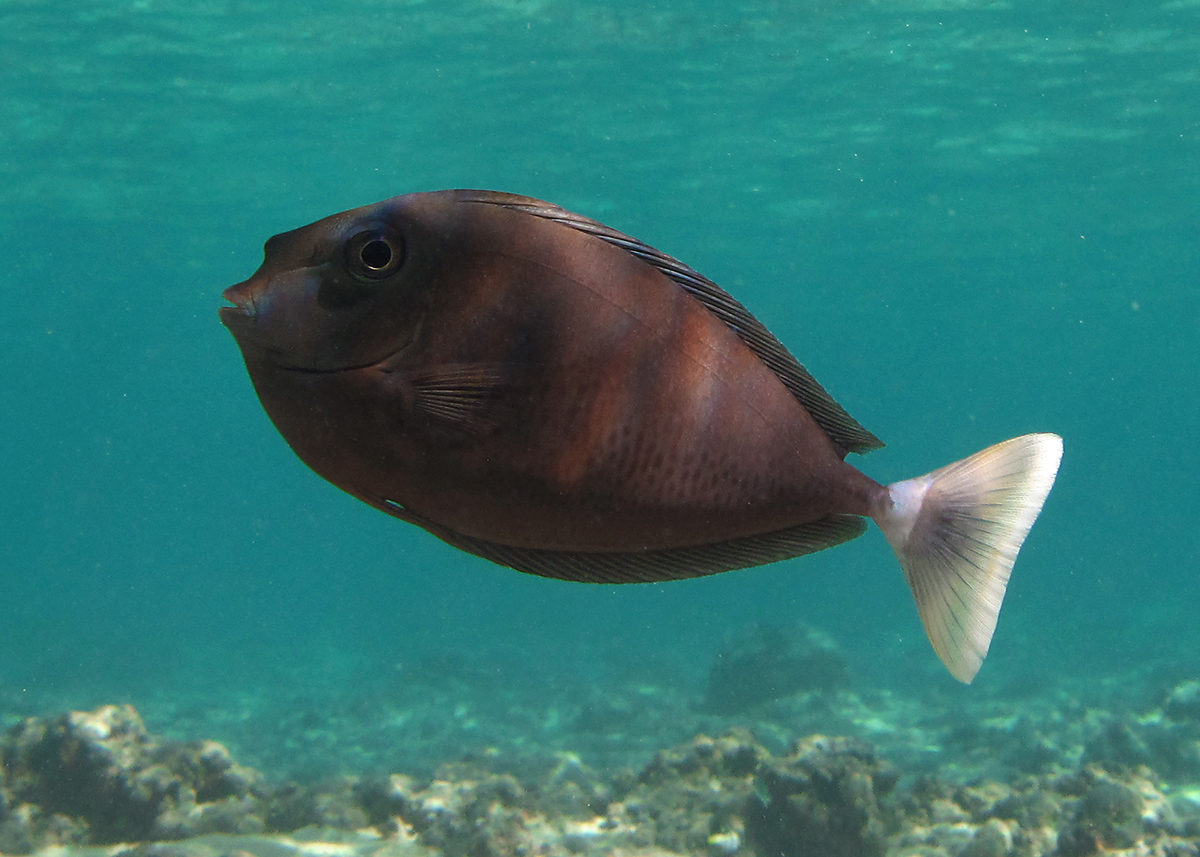
Juvenile

Naso brevirostris forms spawning aggregations, pairing to spawn and the males have larger keels on the caudal peduncle than the females. The eggs hatch into pelagic larvae which may remain in the water column for up to 90 days and the adults attain sexual maturity at around 25 cm (9.8 in). Adults feed mainly on gelatinous zooplankton, while juveniles mainly feed on benthic algae. The switch from grazing to preying on gelatinous zooplankton coincides with the development of the bony protuberance.

== Fisheries ==
Naso brevirostris is caught for food using fish traps and spears, although there have been cases of ciguatera poisoning after eating this fish. It rarely appears in the aquarium trade. This species has a wide range and populations appear to be stable so the IUCN classify it as Least Concern.

== Gallery ==
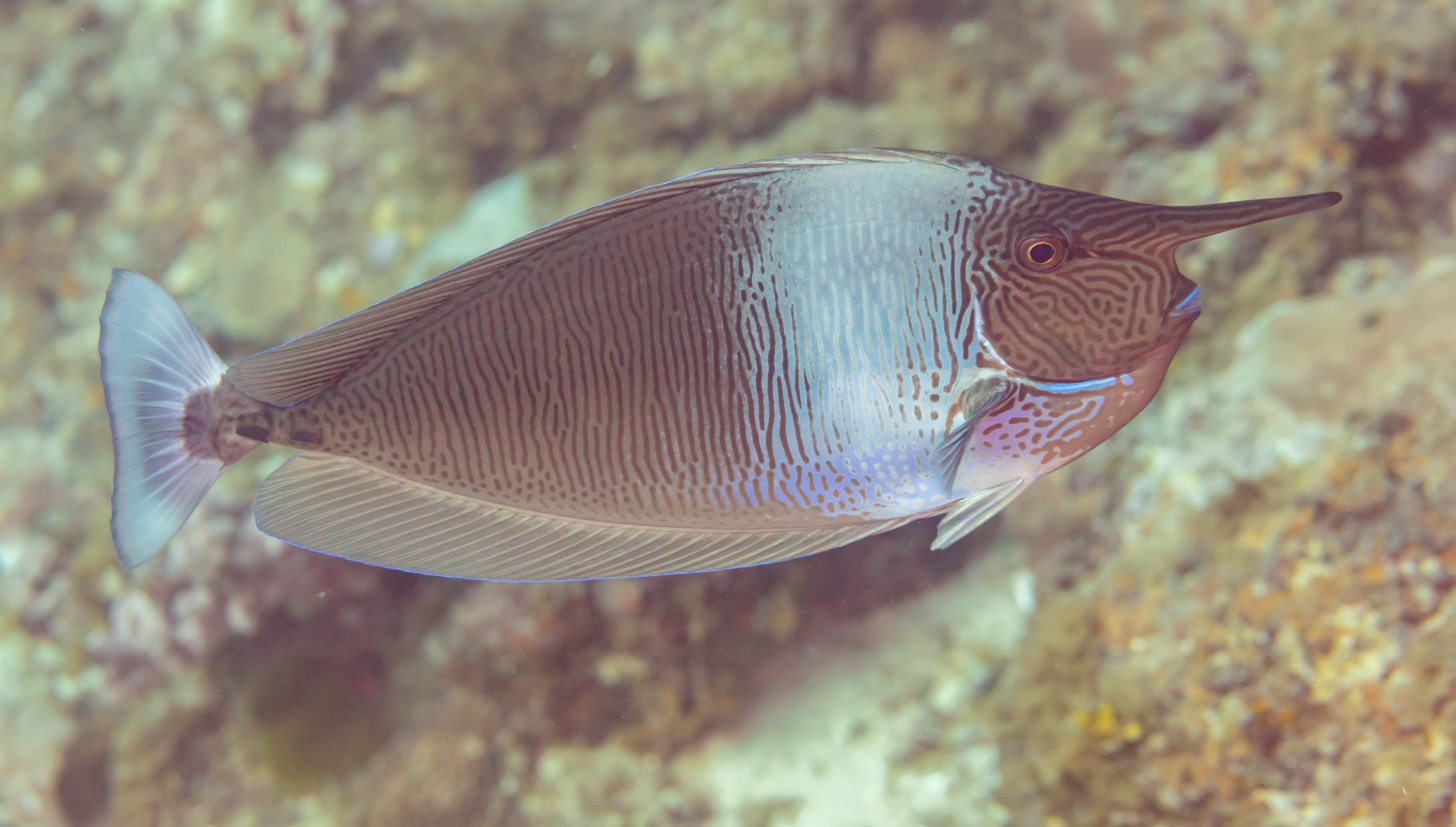
In the coast of Madagascar.

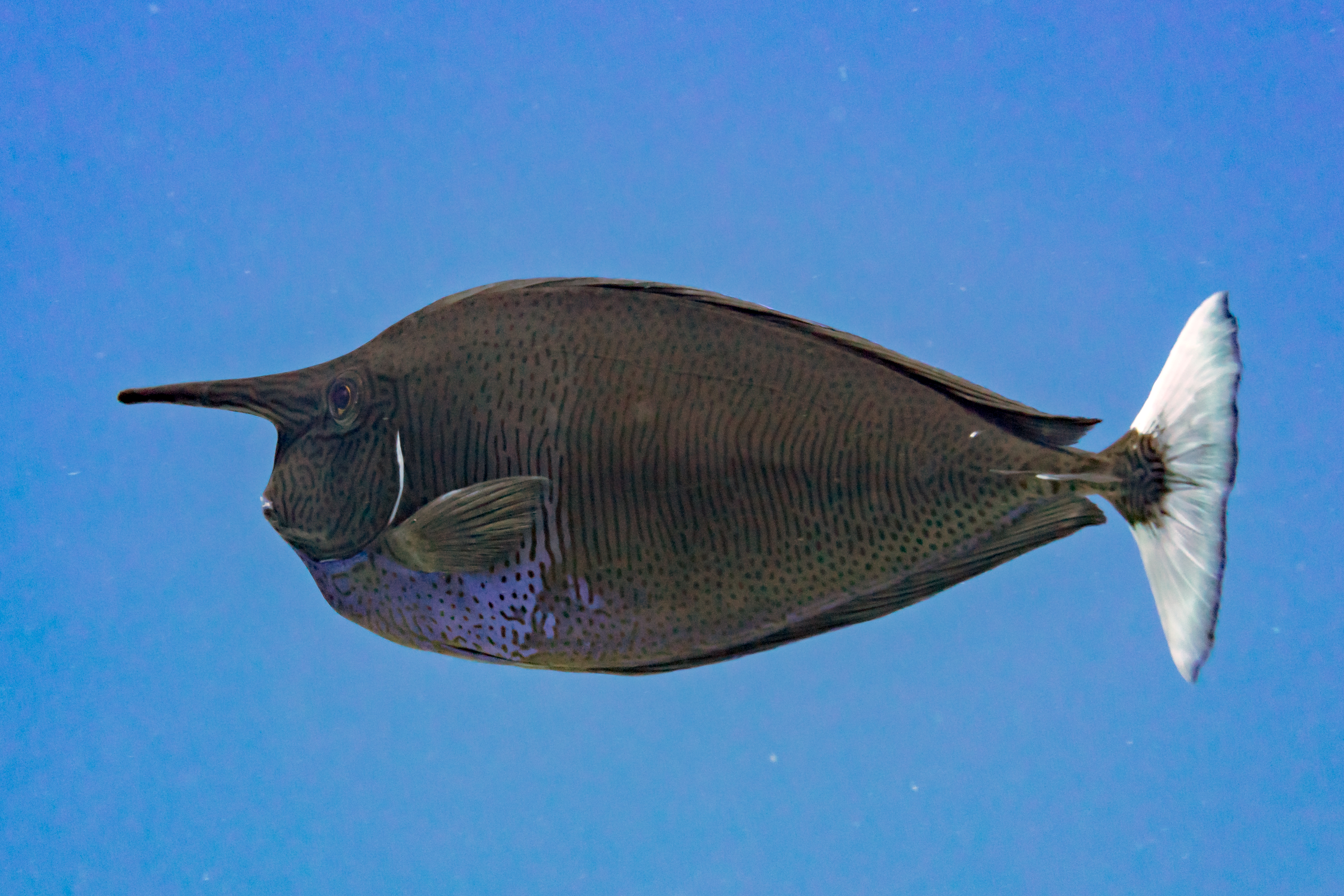
In the Red Sea.

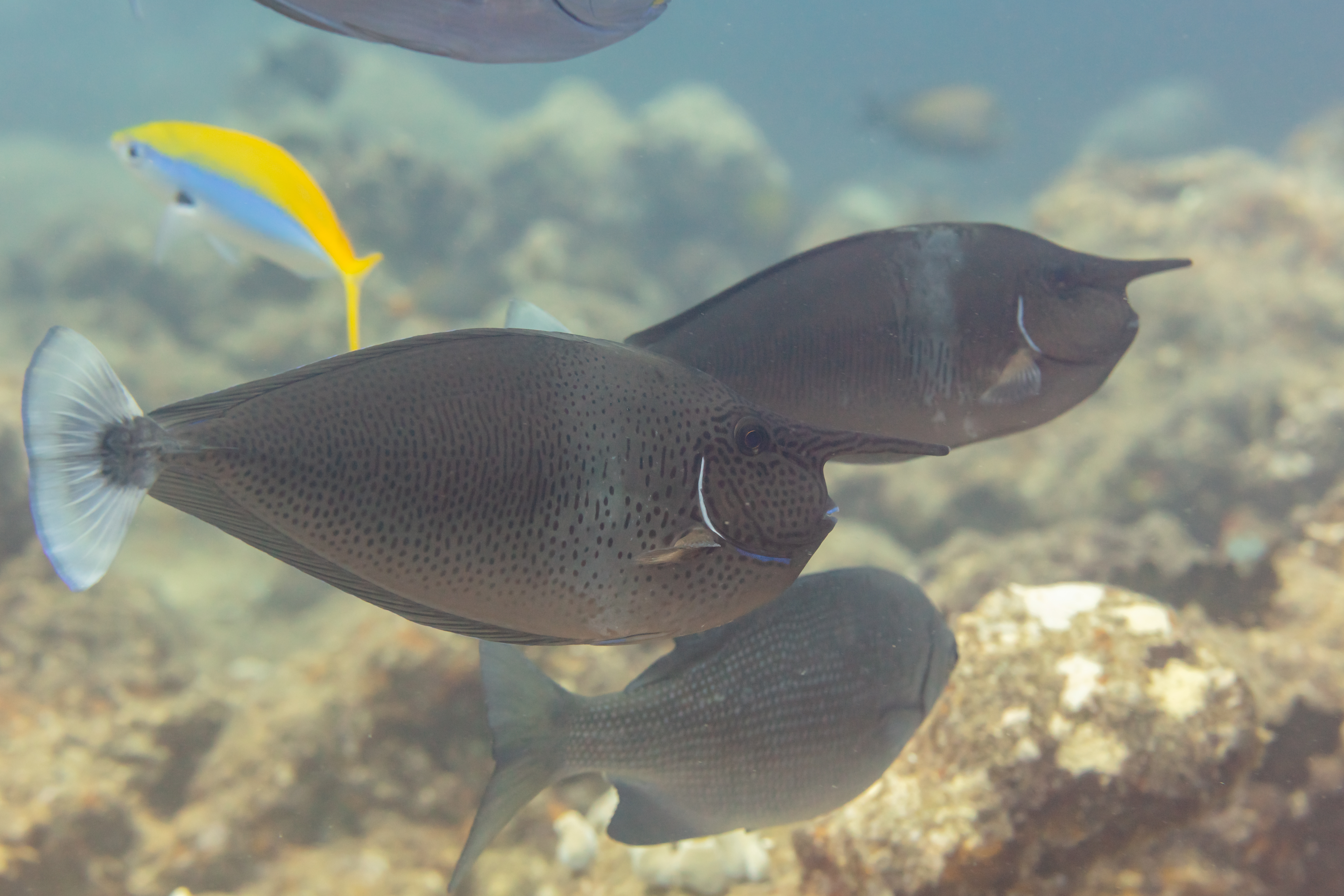
Group.

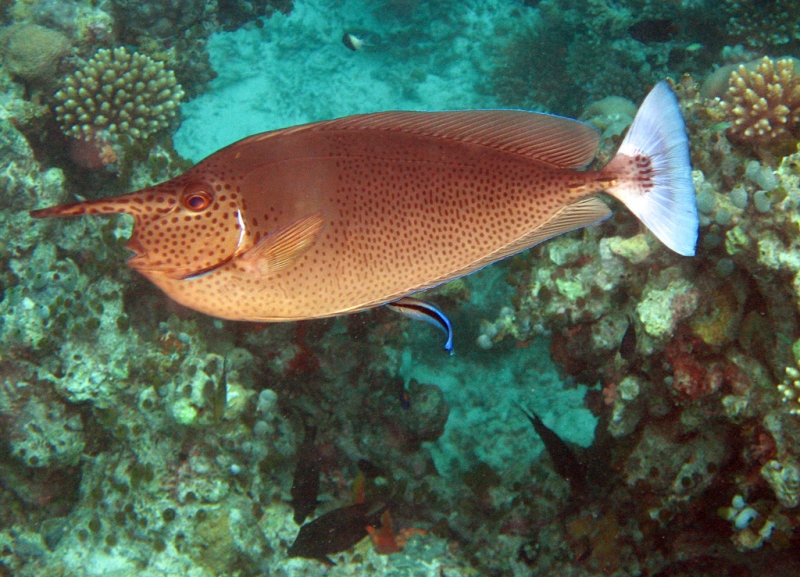
In the Maldives.
