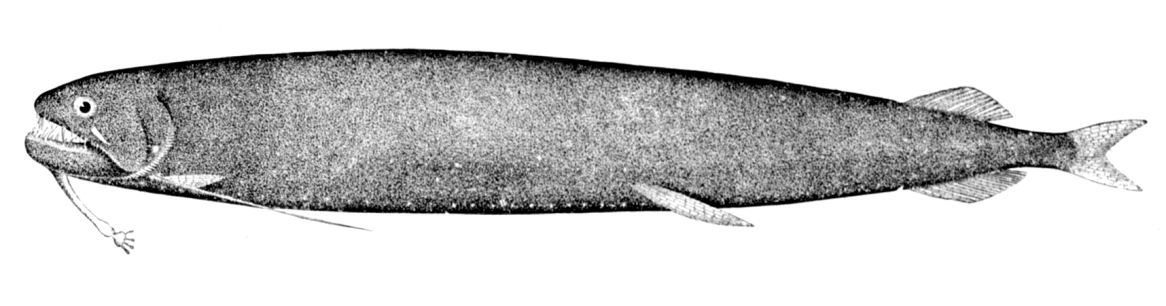

Scientific classification
- Kingdom: Animalia
- Phylum: Chordata
- Class: Actinopterygii
- Order: Stomiiformes
- Family: Stomiidae
- Subfamily: Melanostomiinae
- Genus: Echiostoma; R. T. Lowe, 1843
- Species: E. barbatum

Binomial name
- Echiostoma barbatum R. T. Lowe, 1843

= Echiostoma =

Species of fish

Echiostoma barbatum, the threadfin dragonfish, is a species of barbeled dragonfish and is the only known species in its genus. It is widespread through tropical to temperate waters in all oceans in mid to deep waters up to 2,000 metres (6,600 ft). This species grows to a length of 36.8 centimetres (14.5 in) SL.

Like many fish that live in the Mesopelagic zone the threadfin dragonfish uses bioluminescent organs to attract prey.
