= Flagellostomias =

Scientific classification
- Domain: Eukaryota
- Kingdom: Animalia
- Phylum: Chordata
- Class: Actinopterygii
- Order: Stomiiformes
- Family: Stomiidae
- Subfamily: Melanostomiinae
- Genus: Flagellostomias; A. E. Parr, 1927
- Species: F. boureei

Binomial name
- Flagellostomias boureei (Zugmayer, 1913)

Species of fish

Flagellostomias boureei, the Longbarb dragonfish, is a species of barbeled dragonfish found in the ocean depths worldwide. This species grows to a length of 32.2 centimetres (12.7 in) SL. This species is the only known species in its genus.
