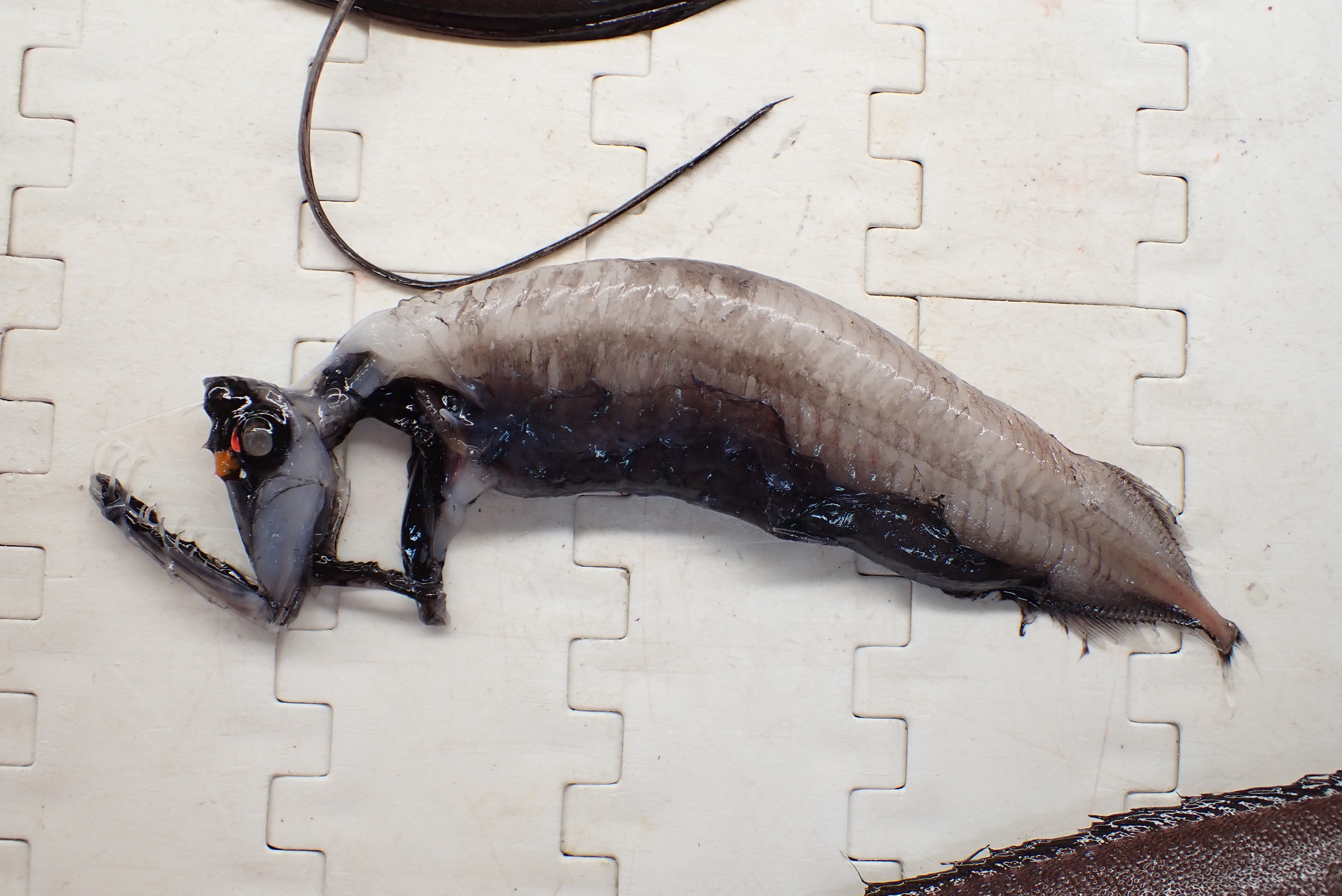
- Freshly caught Aristostomias sp.

Scientific classification
- Kingdom: Animalia
- Phylum: Chordata
- Class: Actinopterygii
- Division: Teleostei
- Order: Stomiiformes
- Family: Stomiidae
- Subfamily: Malacosteinae
- Genus: Aristostomias; Zugmayer, 1913

Type species
- Aristostomias grimaldii Zugmayer, 1913

Synonyms
- Zastomias C. H. Gilbert, 1915

= Aristostomias =

Genus of fishes

Aristostomias is a genus of barbeled dragonfishes native to the ocean depths in the Pacific, Atlantic, and Indian oceans. They are noted for their elongated bodies, large heads, and distinct loosejaw. Aristostomias feed on midwater fishes and follow daily vertical migration patterns. They are known for their red bioluminescence and visual systems built to perceive red light.

== Description ==
Members of the genus Aristostomias are deep-sea dragonfishes characterized by elongated bodies, large heads, and highly specialized jaw structures typical of loosejaw dragonfishes in the family Stomiidae. These fishes possess extremely large gape angles and modified cranial joints that allow the head to rotate upward during feeding. A flexible head joint formed by a folding of the notochordal sheath around the occipital condyle enables the skull to elevate farther than in most other teleost fishes. This adaptation allows Aristostomias to open its mouth to angles approaching 120°, enabling the capture of relatively large prey in the mesopelagic zone.

Unlike many other fishes, species in this genus lack a well-developed intermandibular membrane forming the floor of the mouth. Instead, specialized jaw musculature compensates for the loose structure of the jaws and allows the fish to close its mouth with considerable force despite the large gape. This powerful bite is considered unusual among members of the family Stomiidae and represents a trade-off with reduced throat tissue that limits the ability to generate suction during feeding.

One of the most distinctive morphological features of Aristostomias is its transparent teeth. Studies of Aristostomias scintillans have shown that these teeth are composed primarily of hydroxyapatite and collagen, similar to the composition of vertebrate teeth generally. However, the outer enamel-like layer contains nanoscale hydroxyapatite crystals embedded within an amorphous matrix. These crystals are extremely small, approximately 20 nanometers in size, which reduces Rayleigh scattering and allows light to pass through the tooth structure with minimal reflection. Additionally, the refractive index of the tooth material closely matches that of seawater, further reducing visibility. These structural features render the teeth nearly invisible in the surrounding water and are believed to function as an adaptation for stealth predation.

== Habitat ==
Species of Aristostomias are widely distributed throughout the Atlantic, Pacific, and Indian Oceans, where they inhabit deep pelagic waters. Records indicate that members of the genus occur in several regions of the world's oceans, including the Gulf of Mexico and other mid-latitude and tropical marine environments. They typically inhabit mesopelagic and bathypelagic depths, where light levels are extremely low and bioluminescence plays an important role in ecological interactions. Like many mesopelagic fishes, Aristostomias species are associated with midwater ecosystems characterized by vertically migrating prey organisms such as lanternfishes and crustaceans. Their distribution often overlaps with the vertical movements of these prey species, which may influence their own movement patterns within the water column.

== Feeding ecology ==
Aristostomias species are predatory fishes that primarily feed on midwater organisms, particularly lanternfishes (family Myctophidae). They are generally considered sit-and-wait predators that remain relatively motionless in the water column with their jaws partially open while waiting for prey to approach. When prey enters striking distance, the fish rapidly closes its jaws using specialized jaw musculature capable of generating a strong bite despite the loose structure of the mouth.

Fishes in this family commonly feed on smaller fish, but they can also consume up to 50% of their own size. To do this, their jaws have a "loosejaw" mechanism which allows them to consume large prey and provides an advantage in the food scarce deep sea. Their weak jaws also require sharp teeth in order to successfully capture prey.

Transparent teeth likely contribute to the success of this hunting strategy by reducing the visual detectability of the predator. Because the teeth produce very little light reflection, prey organisms are less likely to detect the open mouth of the predator before capture. The teeth are transparent due to their hydroxyapatite and collagen composition.

=== Diel vertical migration ===
Some species within the genus participate in asynchronous diel vertical migration. In this pattern, part of the population migrates upward in the water column at night while other individuals remain at deeper depths. Observed migration speeds range from approximately 194 to 223 meters per hour, suggesting that these fishes are capable of relatively rapid vertical movements compared with many other deep-sea species. These movements appear to correlate with the vertical migration of prey organisms in the mesopelagic zone.

Some Aristomias may also participate in vertical migration seasonally or lunarly. They were also seen to migrate from depths over 1000m. With the shift in depths there is also an observed shift in morphology. Some species are seen to lose their luminescent organs, which is thought to correspond to the lack of use of the metabolically costly organs in low light zones (Kenaley 2006).

== Red light bioluminescence ==
Similar to other dragonfishes capable of emitting red bioluminescence, including Malacosteus and Pachystomias, species of Aristostomias possess specialized light-producing organs known as photophores. Large suborbital photophores located beneath the eyes emit red-shifted bioluminescent light, while additional postorbital photophores produce blue-green light. In Aristostomias, the production of red light is generated directly through a gland-and-reflector system rather than the filter-based mechanism used by some related dragonfishes. Because red wavelengths attenuate rapidly in seawater, this light is effective only over short distances.

Red bioluminescence is relatively rare among marine organisms and provides an ecological advantage in deep-sea environments where most species cannot detect long-wavelength light. As a result, Aristostomias can illuminate nearby prey without being detected.

== Visual systems ==
Most mesopelagic and bathypelagic fishes possess visual pigments that are primarily sensitive to short-wavelength blue light. In contrast, Aristostomias has evolved visual pigments capable of detecting longer wavelengths, allowing it to perceive the red light produced by its own photophores. The retina contains visual pigments with absorption peaks at approximately 515 nm, 550 nm, and up to about 590 nm, enabling the detection of red-shifted light signals.

Some studies suggest that the ability to detect far-red wavelengths may be linked to chlorophyll-derived photosensitizers within the retina. These compounds may be acquired indirectly through the diet, possibly originating from crustaceans that have consumed phytoplankton containing chlorophyll.

In addition to specialized visual pigments, Aristostomias possesses several anatomical features associated with vision in extremely low-light environments. The eyes contain a high density of rod photoreceptor cells and relatively large pupillary apertures, both of which increase sensitivity to dim light conditions typical of mesopelagic habitats.

Molecular studies of dim-light vision proteins also indicate elevated levels of rhodopsin in deep-sea dragonfishes, with absorption maxima around 526 nm in some species. These findings suggest that dim-light visual adaptations in deep-sea fishes can evolve repeatedly in response to environmental pressures.

== Reproduction ==
Aristostomias are gonochoristic, where individuals are one sex, either male or female, with testicular or ovarian tissue, never having both. Gonochorism is beneficial to these predators with long life spans as genetic diversity is conserved. Both males and females are able to spawn continuously throughout the year, but some females are only able to spawn a few times during a specific season.

Dragonfish have sexually-dimorphic eyes, with mature males having larger lenses and postorbital photophores compared to mature females. Photophores produce bioluminescence, and with them being larger in males, male dragonfish are easier to detect than females. When looking to reproduce, females are able to detect the bioluminescence of males at a greater distance, detecting males before the males find the females.

== Species ==
There are currently six recognized species in this genus:

- Aristostomias grimaldii Zugmayer, 1913
- Aristostomias lunifer Regan & Trewavas, 1930
- Aristostomias polydactylus Regan & Trewavas, 1930
- Aristostomias scintillans (C. H. Gilbert, 1915) (Shiny loosejaw)
- Aristostomias tittmanni W. W. Welsh, 1923 (Loosejaw)
- Aristostomias xenostoma Regan & Trewavas, 1930
