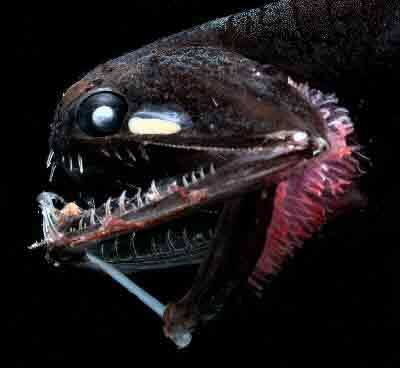
- Photostomias goodyeari

Scientific classification
- Kingdom: Animalia
- Phylum: Chordata
- Class: Actinopterygii
- Division: Teleostei
- Order: Stomiiformes
- Suborder: Phosichthyoidei
- Family: Stomiidae

Genera
- Sea text

= Stomiidae =

Stomiidae Temporal range: Middle Eocene–present

Family of fishes

Stomiidae is a family of deep-sea ray-finned fish, including the barbeled dragonfishes, that live in all oceans in a wide range of depths. They are quite small, ranging around 15 to 26 centimetres (5.9 to 10.2 in) long, and they exhibit a strong sexual dimorphism. These fish are apex predators and have enormous jaws filled with fang-like teeth; their specially adapted neurocranium and upper-jaw system allows them to open their jaws to more than 100 degrees. This ability allows them to consume extremely large prey, often 50% greater than their standard length.

== Genera ==
- Aristostomias (Shiny loosejaws)
- Astronesthes (Snaggletooths)
- Bathophilus (Highfin Dragonfishes)
- Borostomias (Stareaters)
- Chauliodus (Viperfishes)
- Chirostomias (Goldleaf Dragonfishes)
- Echiostoma (Threadfin Dragonfishes)
- Eupogonesthes (Exotic Snaggletooths)
- Eustomias (Deep Sea Dragonfishes)
- Flagellostomias (Longbarb Dragonfishes)
- Grammatostomias (Hooped Dragonfishes)
- Heterophotus (Wingfin Snaggletooths)
- Idiacanthus (Blackdragons)
- Leptostomias (Slender Barbelled Dragonfishes)
- Malacosteus (Stoplight Loosejaws)
- Melanostomias (Scaleless Black Dragonfishes)
- Neonesthes (Cape Snaggletooths)
- Odontostomias (Smallhead Dragonfishes)
- Opostomias (Obese Dragonfishes)
- Pachystomias (Smalltooth Loosejaws)
- Photonectes (Longjaw Dragonfishes)
- Photostomias (Black Loosejaws)
- Rhadinesthes (Slender Snaggletooths)
- Stomias (Scaly Dragonfishes)
- Tactostoma (Longfin Dragonfishes)
- Thysanactis (Broomfin Dragonfishes)
- Trigonolampa (Threelight Dragonfishes)
Examples of Stomiids

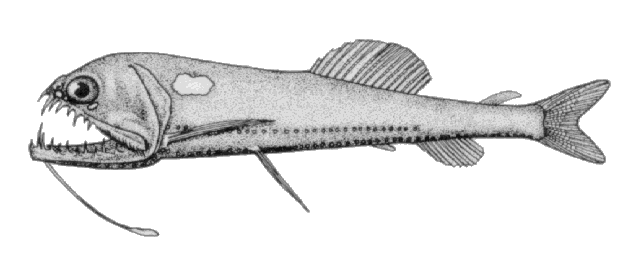
Astronesthes niger

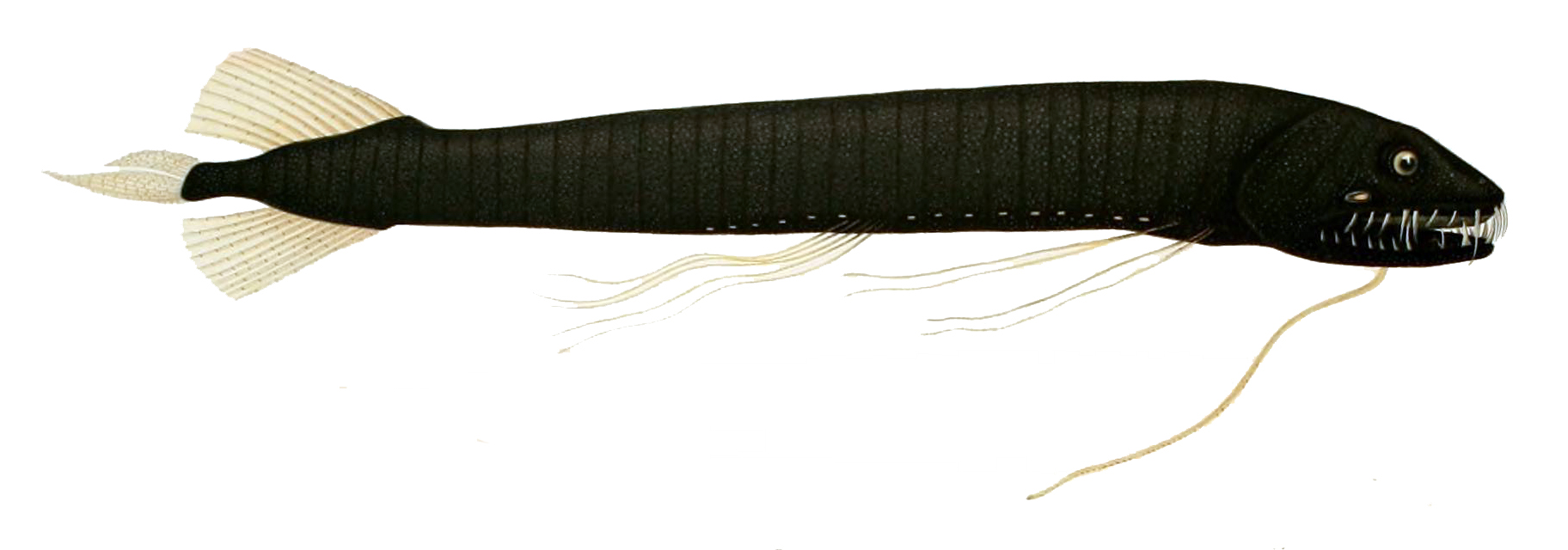
Bathophilus vaillanti

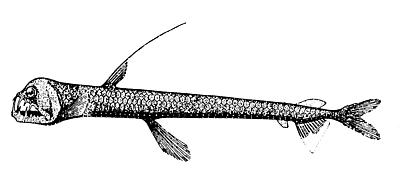
Chauliodus danae

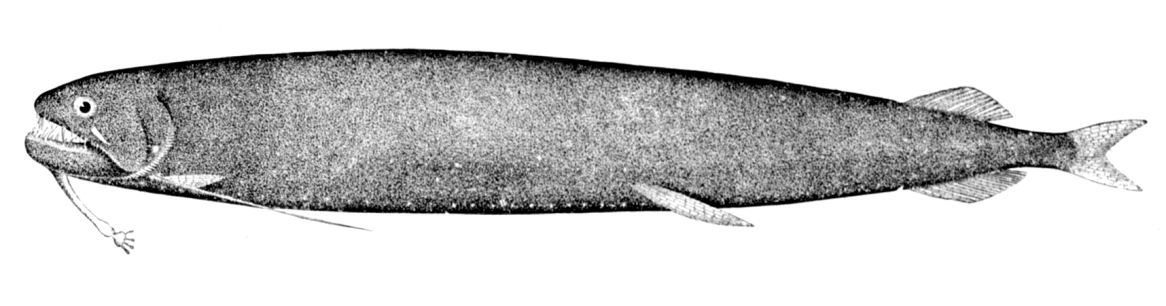
Echiostoma barbatum

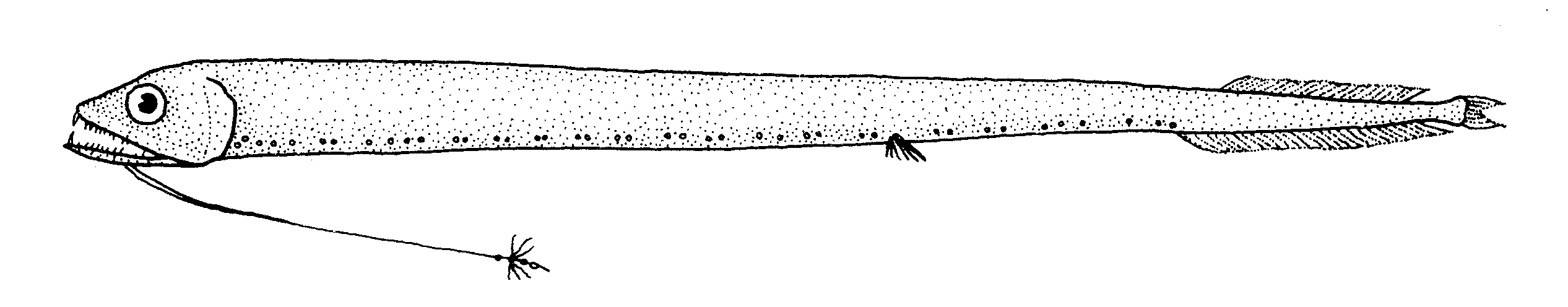
Eustomias trewavasae

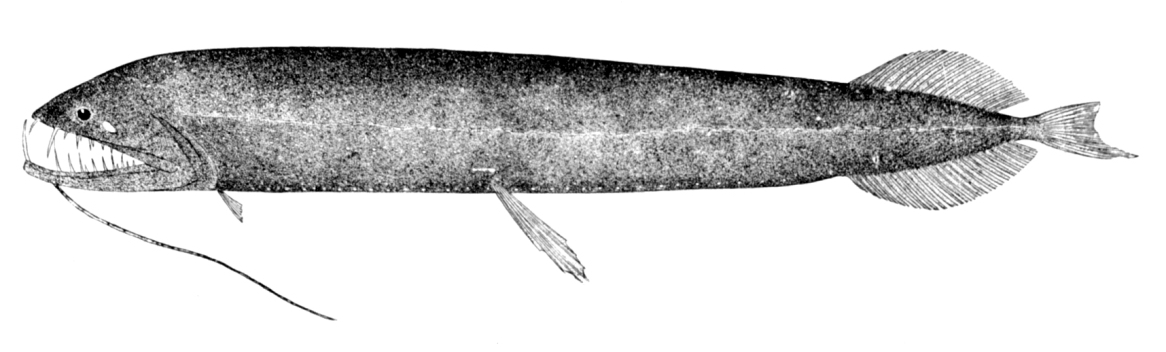
Grammatostomias dentatus

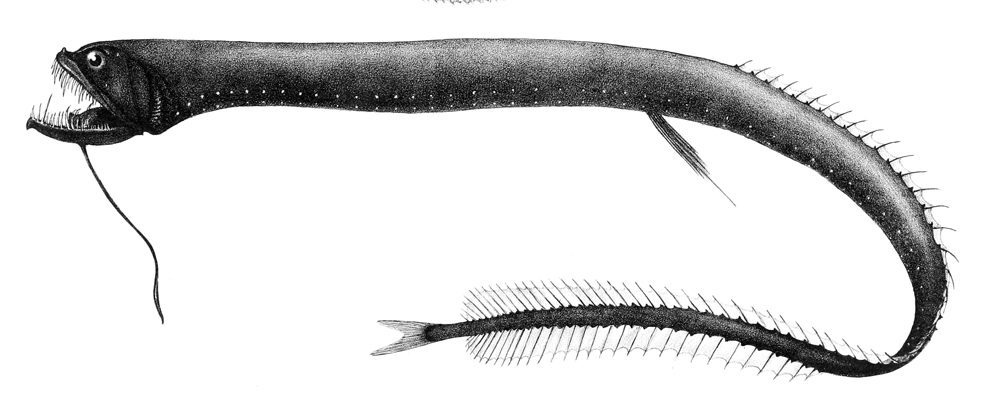
Idiacanthus atlanticus

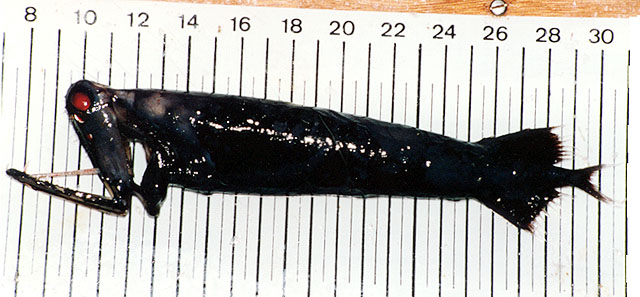
Malacosteus niger

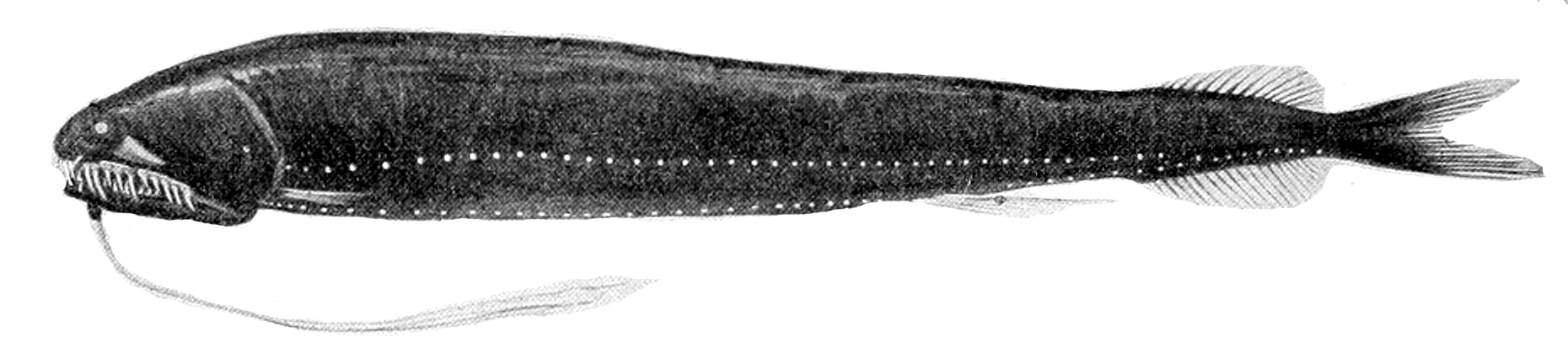
Melanostomias melanops

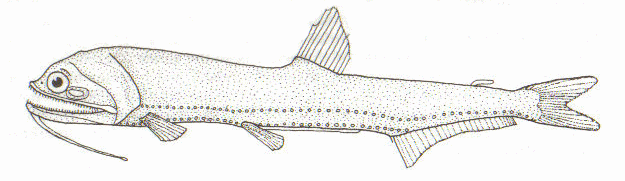
Neonesthes capensis

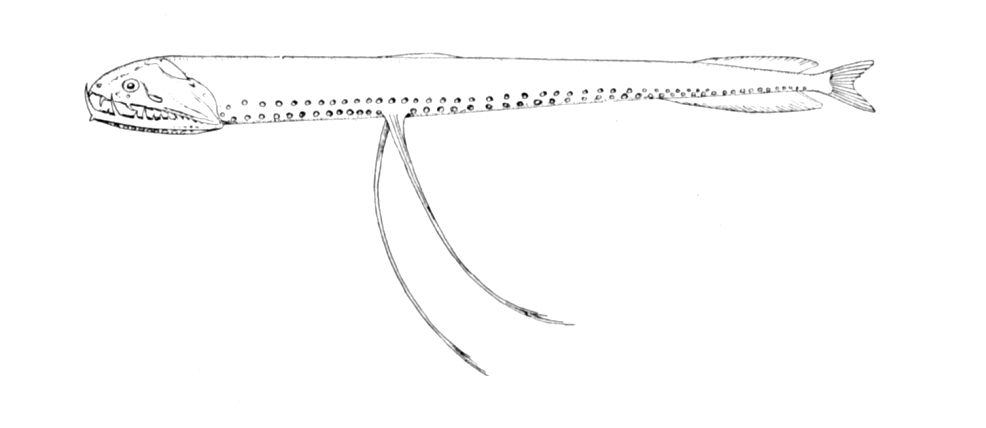
Photostomias guernei

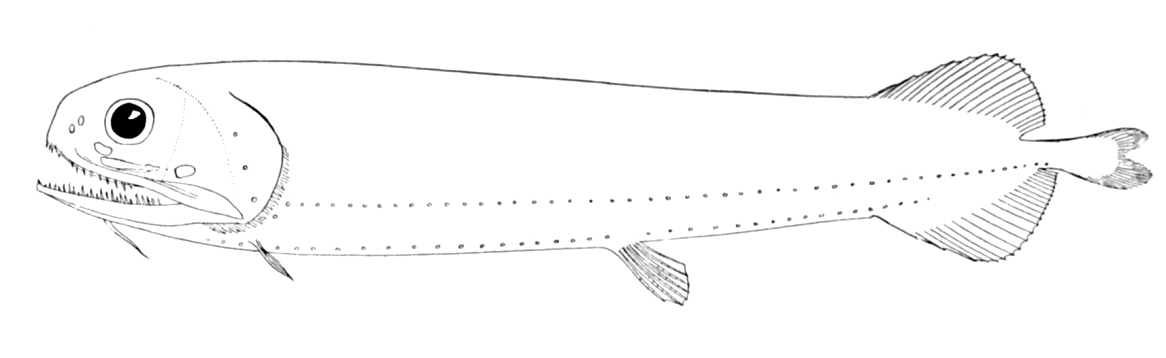
Pachystomias microdon

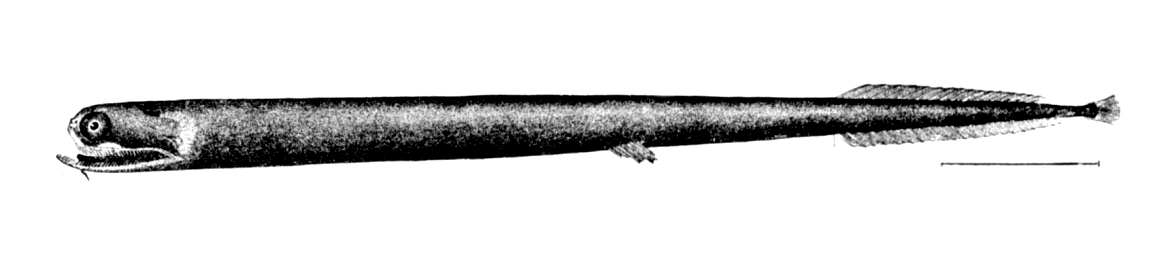
Photonectes gracilis

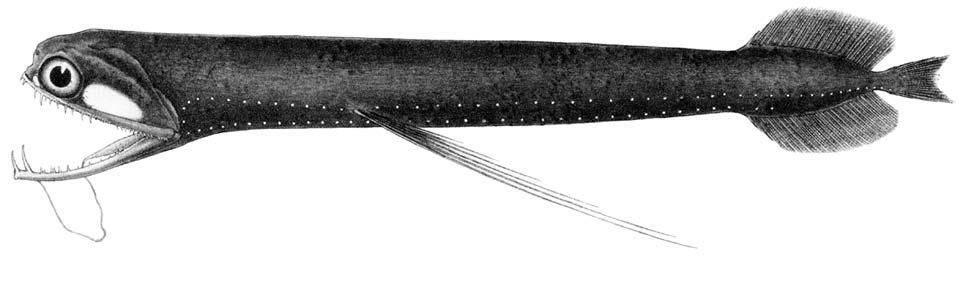
Photostomias atrox

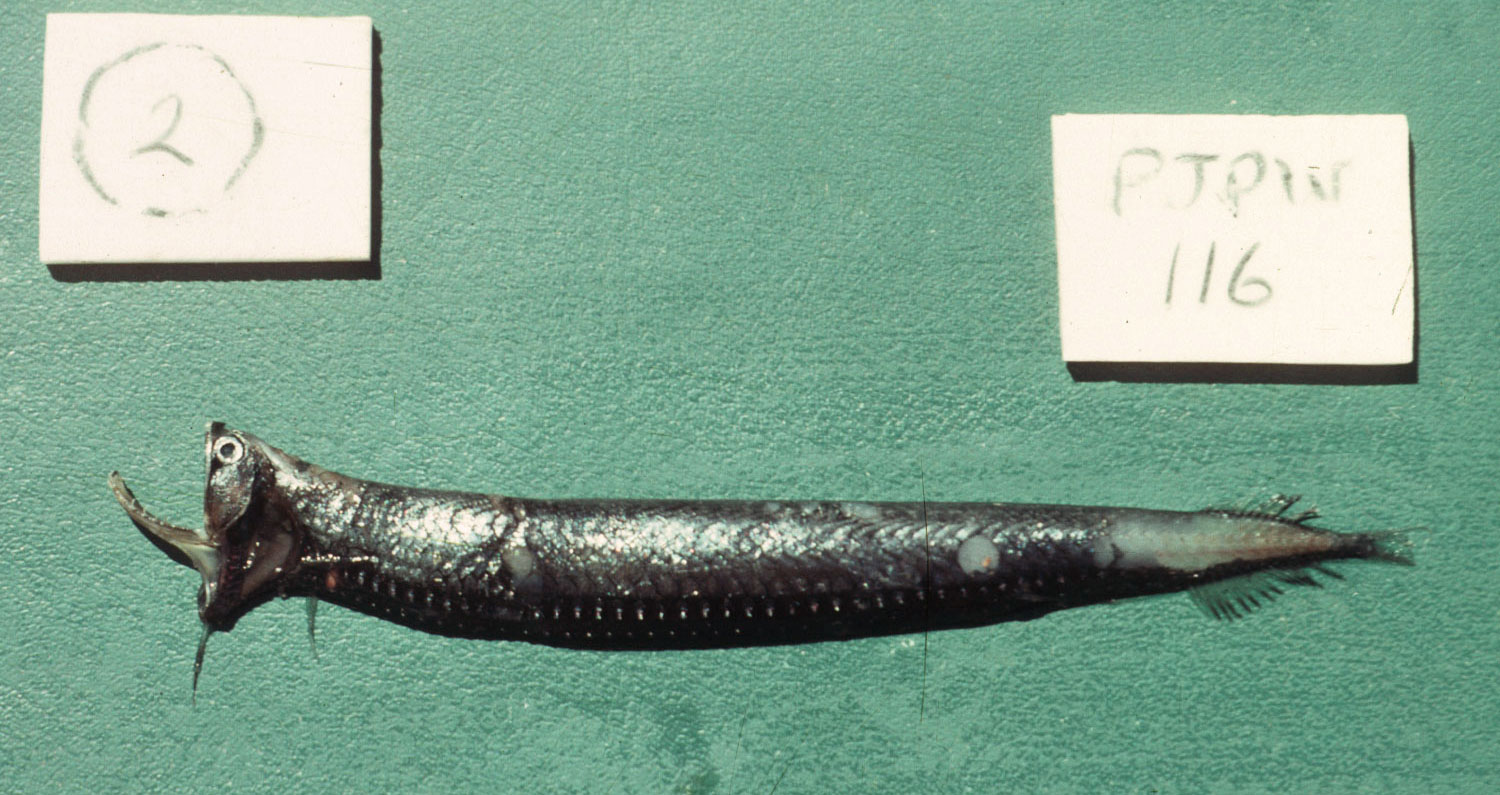
Stomias nebulosus

Due to their extreme habitats, stomiids are very rare in the fossil record. The oldest known genus is †Azemiolestes Prokofiev, 2001 from the Middle Eocene (Lutetian) of Georgia. Other fossil genera include †Abruzzoichthys Carnevale, 2002 from the Middle Miocene of Italy and †Mrazecia Pauca, 1929 from the Early Oligocene of Romania.

== Habitat ==
The family Stomiidae can be found in all oceans. They also exist at a wide range of depths between the surface and thousands of meters deep into the bathypelagic zone, depending on the water's ideal feeding and breeding conditions. There is also some evidence that certain species within the family Stomiidae exhibit migratory behavior. Temperature, salinity, oxygen, and fluorescence profiles of an area can affect some species' (like Sloane's viperfish Chauliodus sloani) preferred habitat changes from day to night with diel vertical migration (DVM).

Brian Coad, ichthyologist from the Canada Museum of Nature once observed that there are "64 [species of Dragonfishes] reported from Canada, 5 of which reach the Arctic". These species are most commonly found in the mesopelagic to bathypelagic regions at a depth of 1,000–4,000 m (3,300–13,100 ft), and in the Arctic, most samples of these species have been captured along the Davis Strait. The average temperature in these waters is approximately 3–4 °C (37–39 °F) Some examples of species discovered in that region are: Astronesthes cf. richardsoni; Borostomia antarcticus; Chauliodus sloani; Malacosteus niger; Rhadinesthes decimus; Stomias boa.

== Description ==
Deep-sea dragonfish are one of the many deep-sea fish that can produce their own light through a chemical process known as bioluminescence. Special organs known as photophores produce this light. The deep-sea dragonfishes have large heads, and mouths equipped with many sharp fang-like teeth. They have a long stringlike structure known as a barbel, with a light-producing photophore at the tip, attached to their chin. They also have photophores along the sides of their body.

=== Jaw mechanism ===
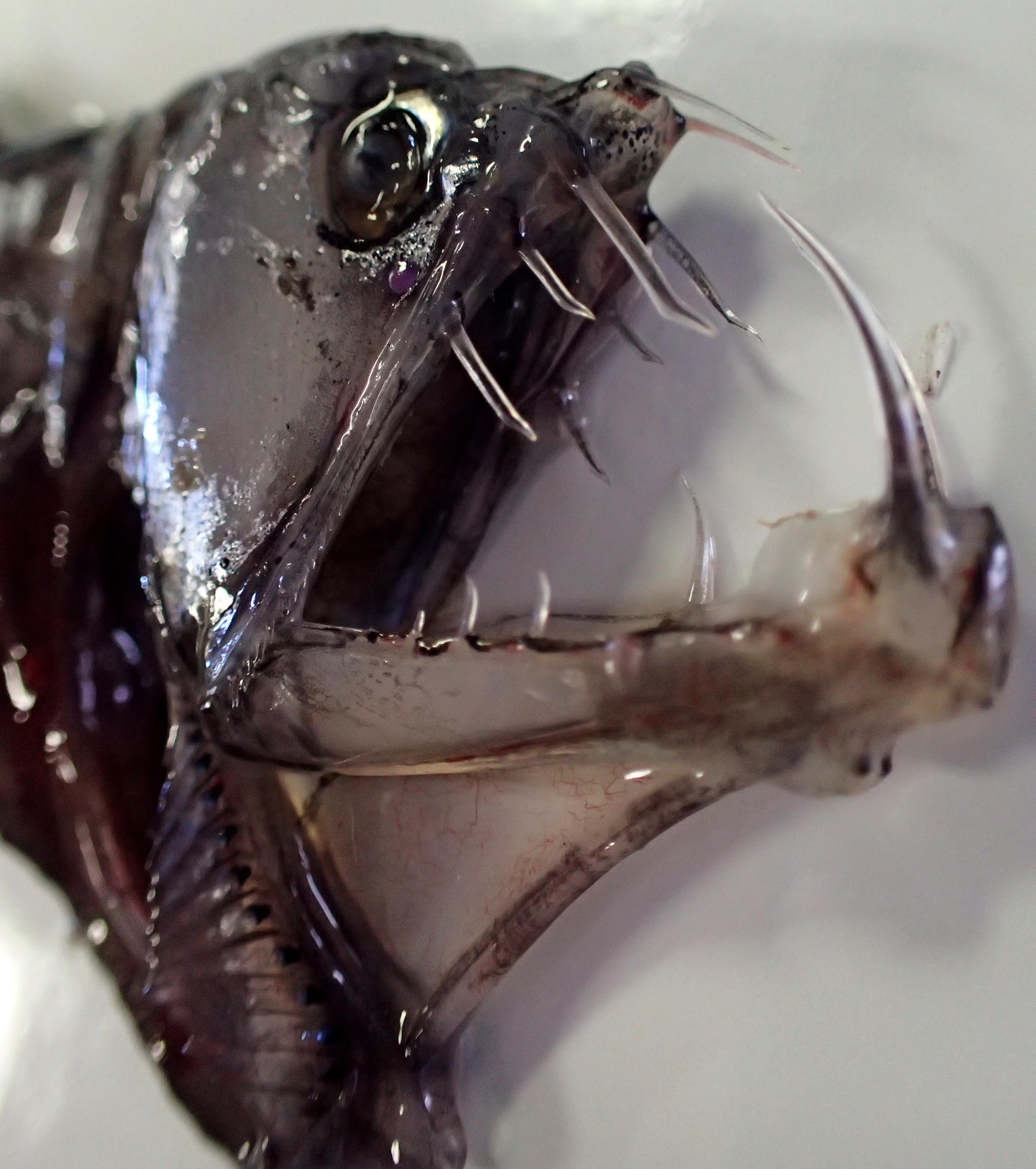
Head closeup of Chauliodus sloani

The jaw of members in the Stomiidae family is adapted extremely well for survival and predation in the deep sea. Although these fish are relatively small in size, the dragonfish jaw is adapted to capture large prey that are up to 50% the body mass of themselves. The long "loosejaw" of dragonfish exhibits increased resistive forces to lower jaw adduction due to its length; however, the absence of a "floor" to the oral cavity decreases the surface area of the lower jaw, reducing resistive forces, and the adductor mass of the lower jaw of deep-sea dragonfish is significantly decreased, allowing for increased ability to attain high adduction velocity. This makes the deep-sea dragonfish significantly more competitive when hunting for prey due to its ability to capture large prey quickly and efficiently.

Members of this family also have a unique head joint that contributes to their ability to open their 'loosejaw' so wide: an occipito-vertebral gap is present where only the flexible notochord is present, between the base of the skull and first vertebrae. Additionally, the first to tenth anterior vertebrae are reduced or entirely absent in some taxa. This gap is the result of notochord elongation in this specific area. Functionally, the gap allows deep-sea dragonfish to pull back their cranium and open their mouths up to 120°, which is significantly farther than other taxa that lack such a head joint. The extent of the head movement exposes the gills and presents a wide opening to the oral cavity behind the head. This is what allows deep-sea dragonfish to engulf such large prey, resulting in improved survival through the ability to consume more organisms in an extremely food limited environment.

On top of an extremely well adapted jaw, members of the Stomiidae family also have teeth that are adapted for hunting in deep sea. Their teeth are sharp, hard, stiff, and transparent when wet, making their teeth dangerous weapons as these teeth become basically invisible in the light absent deep sea. This means the refraction index of their teeth is nearly identical to that of the sea water they inhabit. The transparency is due to a nanoscale structure of hydroxyapatite and collagen, while the tips of the transparent teeth of deep-sea dragonfish were found to emit more red light in seawater which further contributes to its transparency as red light is close to invisible at these depths due to being absorbed quickly by the water.

An important distinction in jaw morphology between an adult dragonfish and its larvae is the shape of the mouth. The adult fish have an elongated snout-like face with a protruding jaw, while the larvae have a rounder shaped mouth and a lower jaw that does not protrude.

=== Sensory organs ===
The deep-sea dragonfishes are part of the Stomiidae family, making up a clade of 28 genera and 290 species. The dragonfish possess unique adaptations to help them thrive in the deepest parts of the ocean. This family has been discovered to use certain long-wave and short-wave bioluminescence to communicate, lure prey, distract predators, and camouflage themselves. The Stomiidae has many unique adaptations to their sensory organs for the deep sea. Most deep-sea organisms have only a single visual pigment sensitive to the absorbance ranges of 470–490 nm. This type of optical system is commonly found in Stomiidae. However, three genera of dragonfish evolved the ability to produce both long-wave and short-wave bioluminescence. In addition, deep-sea dragon fishes evolved retinas with far-red emitting photophores and rhodopsins. These far-red emitting properties produce long-wave bioluminescence greater than 650 nm. This unique evolutionary trait was first seen around 15.4 Ma and had a single evolutionary origin within the Stomiidae.

One study focused on the Stomiidae found that dragonfish use far-red emitting photophores and rhodopsins to detect prey and navigate their habitats. Additionally, dragonfish use chlorophyll in their eyes to detect the weak bioluminescence of their prey, which is an unusual adaptation for a vertebrate.

=== Sexual dimorphism ===
Throughout their development, the Stomiidae exhibit a wide degree of sexual dimorphism. Female adult Stomiidae are much larger than the males. Some male stomiids, like those of the Idiacanthinae, also lack teeth, a chin barbel, a functional gut, and pelvic fins in their larval stages in contrast to their female larval counterparts. Additionally, a significant visual detection gap exists between males and females. Males have larger eyes and lenses that contain more photoreceptors than females, which enables the males to detect females at a greater distance than the females can detect males.

=== Reproductive features ===
Dragonfish females exhibit two distinct oocytes cohorts at a time, one which is a white cream color during the first growing stage and the other which is orange-reddish in vitellogenesis. The orange-reddish ovaries are released in the current spawning season, while the other batch is in the growing stage. Stomiids are gonochoristic, allowing them to increase their reproductive fitness by using their energy to produce gametes instead of reconfiguring the reproductive system. The female adult stomiids are also larger than the males.

=== Bioluminescence ===
Stomiidae are largely characterized by one of their bioluminescent organs: their barbels glow to act as lures for prey and are a species-specific structure. These barbels extend anteriorly off the bottom jaw, and prey attracted to its bioluminescence include lanternfish and bristlemouths. It is proposed that the specificity of bioluminescent barbel structure to certain species allows for advantageous same-species recognition that promotes genetic isolation, in addition to allowing scientists to more easily identify distinct species due to anatomical barbel differences. The diversity of Stomiidae species is exceptional for their clade age thanks largely to the species-specific barbels. Further, sexual dimorphism of bioluminescence in dragonfish contributes to even greater diversity within the species, but the greater abundance of immature specimens within research collections makes studying sexual dimorphism challenging.

A red photophore is visible in the suborbital region of this Malacosteus rendering.

In addition to a bioluminescent barbel, members of the Stomiidae have a blue light emitting photophore in the postorbital region. Some dragonfish, such as the Malacosteus niger, all Aristostomias species, Pachystomias microdon, and Chirostomias also have a unique red light emitting photophore in the suborbital region. It is thought that the mechanism of red bioluminescence produced by the suborbital photophore is facilitated by energy transmission and is chemically similar to the blue bioluminescence of the barbel. While suborbital photophores that emit red bioluminescence are particularly helpful for finding prey, since many organisms in the deep sea can only see blue light, it appears as though this red light emission by dragonfish is not directly associated with prey choice, and it is thus hypothesized that it may be used for intraspecific communication. This raises an interesting question of to what extent the red bioluminescence determines dragonfish prey choice.

Chauliodus viperfish cannot luminesce longer than 30 minutes without adrenaline. However, in presence of adrenaline, it can produce light for many hours.

==== Lure bioluminescence ====
Species of the Stomiidae family use blue bioluminescence for communication, camouflage, and as a luring mechanism. They emit shortwave blue bioluminescence from postorbital photophores and from a long, slender appendage on the chin, called the barbel. The shaft of the barbel is composed of cylindrical muscles, blood vessels and nervous fibers, and the bulb of the barbel has a single photophore. The catecholamine adrenaline is found in the connective tissue within the stem. One hypothesis regarding barbel control is that adrenaline innervation may control both the movement of the barbel and its production of bioluminescence. Data from a study performed on specimens of the Stomias boa species agree with this hypothesis because the barbels of the dragonfish produced light emissions following exposure to external adrenaline.

The loose jaw dragonfishes, which include species from Aristostomias, Malacosteus, and Pachystomias, have the ability to detect and produce red bioluminescence. This is made possible by far-red emitting photophores located under the eye and rhodopsins that are sensitive to long-wave emissions. This red bioluminescence is used to illuminate prey and to detect other far-red dragonfishes, because it goes undetected by most other species. The species with far-red emitting photophores differ in morphology and behavior from most other dragonfish species. For example, the barbels of these species are more simple in structure than those of other dragonfishes. They also differ in foraging strategies. While most dragonfishes that produce shortwave blue bioluminescence undergo regular diel vertical migrations, this is not seen in those with far-red emissions. The foraging strategy they undergo involves remaining in the deep-sea and emitting far-red bioluminescence to illuminate a small area and search for prey. Although Malacosteus, Pachystomias, and Aristostomias all have suborbital photophores that produce red bioluminescence, there are differences in the suborbital photophores between these three genera, in their shape, color, flash duration, and maximum emission.

== Behavior ==
Dragonfish are a type of teleost fish that inhabit the deep sea and use bioluminescence to detect prey and communicate with potential mates. They possess far-red emitting photophores and rhodopsins that are sensitive to long-wave emissions greater than 650 nm, and have adapted to the unique light conditions of the deep-sea environment. Their blue-green light travel the farthest through the ocean's waters due to their wavelengths. Deep-sea dragonfish wave their barbels back and forth and produces flashing lights on and off to attract prey and potential mates. Many of the species they prey upon also produce light themselves, which is why they have evolved to have black stomach walls to keep the lights concealed while digesting their meal in order to stay hidden from their predators.

=== Reproductive behavior ===
Egg-laying, which predominantly occurs in October, is preceded by a distinctive whirling behavior driven by the male prodding the side of the female's abdomen. Additionally, dragonfish possess a unique adaptation of being able to see using chlorophyll in their eyes, which may allow them to detect the weak bioluminescence of their prey and navigate their dark habitats more effectively. This research sheds light on the reproductive behavior and early life stages of the naked dragonfish and contributes to our understanding of the ecology and behavior of dragonfish species.

=== Visual communication and behavior ===
Teleost fishes exhibit a wide range of visual signals, including color, texture, form, and motion, that are used to find mates, establish dominance, defend territory, and coordinate group behavior. Dragonfish have specialized bioluminescent organs that produce red light to communicate with potential mates and prey. Understanding the visual communication and behavior of teleost fishes is essential to understanding the behavior of dragonfish in their natural habitats.

=== Feeding ===
One species of Stomiidae, Malacosteus niger, was studied to investigate more about the trophic ecology of this species and perhaps reveal more about the family as a whole. This species, similar to many of the other species in this family, has large fangs, jaws, and other physiological traits that would suggest predation of larger animals. Studies of specimens from the North Atlantic, Gulf of Mexico, and throughout the Pacific suggest feeding habits contrary to this hypothesis: the majority of the prey numbers were large calanoid copepods, roughly between 65% and 80%, and prey biomass roughly between 10% and 45%. Indeed, other species from this family prey on larger animals, M. niger being no exception. In fact, of the Stomiidae family, M. niger appears to be the most fit for larger prey, as indicated by its feeding morphology.
