= Phylogenetic classification of bony fishes =

Classification of bony fishes according to evolutionary history

The phylogenetic classification of bony fishes is a phylogenetic classification of bony fishes and is based on phylogenies inferred using molecular and genomic data for nearly 2000 fishes. Bony fishes belong to the clade Osteichthyes, which is a subgroup of the jawed vertebrates (Gnathostomata). The first version was published in 2013 and resolved 66 orders. The latest version (version 4) was published in 2017 and recognised 72 orders and 79 suborders.

== Phylogeny ==
The following cladograms show the phylogeny of the Osteichthyes down to order level, with the number of families in parentheses.

- Osteichthyes
  - Sarcopterygii (lobe‑finned fishes)
    - Actinista
      Coelacanthiformes (1) — coelacanths
    - Dipnotetrapodomorpha
      - Dipnomorpha
        Ceratodontiformes (3) — lungfishes
      - Tetrapodomorpha — tetrapods
  - Actinopterygii (ray‑finned fishes)
    - - Cladistia
        - Polypteriformes (1) — bichirs
    - - Chondrostei
        - Acipenseriformes (2) — paddlefishes and sturgeons
      - Neopterygii
        - Holostei
          - Amiiformes (1) — bowfins
          - Lepisosteiformes (1) — gars
        - Teleostei
          - Elopomorpha
            - Elopiformes — tenpounders (ladyfishes), tarpons
            - - Anguilliformes — eels
              - - Notacanthiformes — halosaurs and deep-sea spiny eels
                - Albuliformes — bonefishes
          - Osteoglossocephalai
            - Osteoglossomorpha
              - Hiodontiformes (1) — mooneyes
              - Osteoglossiformes (5) — bonytongues, butterflyfishes, elephantfishes, abas
            - Clupeocephala
              - Otomorpha (=Otocephala)
                - Clupeiformes (5) — herrings (including anchovies, sardines, etc)
                - - Alepocephali
                    Alepocephaliformes (2) — slickheads, tubeshoulders
                  - Ostariophysi
                    - Gonorynchiformes (3) — milkfishes, beaked sandfishes, knerias and snake mudheads
                    - Otophysa (=Otophysi)
                      - Cypriniformes (24) — carps, loaches, minnows, and relatives
                      - - Characiformes (23) — characins (including tetras and piranhas)
                        - - Gymnotiformes (5) — Neotropical knifefishes
                          - Siluriformes (41) — catfishes
              - Euteleosteomorpha (=Euteleostei)
                - Lepidogalaxiiformes (1) — salamanderfishes
                - - - Protacanthopterygii
                      - Argentiniformes (4) — marine smelts
                      - - Galaxiiformes (1) — galaxids
                        - - Esociformes (2) — pikes, mudminnows
                          - Salmoniformes (1) — trout, salmon, and whitefish
                  - - Stomiati
                      - Osmeriformes (4) — freshwater smelts
                      - Stomiiformes (4) — dragonfishes
                    - Neoteleostei
                      - Ateleopodiformes (1) — jellynose fishes
                      - Eurypterygii
                        - Cyclosquamata
                          Aulopiformes (17) — lizardfishes
                        - Ctenosquamata
                          - Myctophiformes (2) — lanternfishes, blackchins
                          - Acanthomorphata (=Acanthomorpha)
                            spiny-rayed fishes (43 orders, see below)

The 43 orders of spiny-rayed fishes are related as follows:

- Acanthomorphata (spiny‑rayed fishes)
  - - Lampriformes (6) — opahs (velifers, opahs, crestfishes, tapertails, ribbonfishes, oarfishes)
    - Paracanthopterygii
      - Percopsiformes (3) — trout-perches, pirate perches, cavefishes
      - - Zeiformes (6) — dories
        - - Stylephoriformes (1) — tube-eyes or thread-tails
          - Gadiformes (12) — cods and hakes
  - - Polymixiipterygii
      Polymixiiformes (1) — beardfishes
    - Acanthopterygii
      - - - Trachichthyiformes (5) — roughies
          - Beryciformes (8) — alfonsinos, whalefishes, etc
      - - Holocentriformes (1) — squirrelfishes
        - Percomorphaceae (=Percomorpha)
          - - Ophidiaria
              Ophidiiformes (1) — cusk-eels
          - - - Batrachoidaria
                Batrachoidiformes (1) — toadfishes
            - - - Pelagiaria
                  Scombriformes (17) — mackerels
                - Syngnatharia
                  Syngnathiformes (10) — pipefishes and seahorses
              - - - Gobiaria
                    - Kurtiformes (2) — nurseryfishes and cardinalfishes
                    - Gobiiformes (9) — gobies
                - - - - Anabantaria
                        - Synbranchiformes (4) — swamp eels
                        - Anabantiformes (7) — labyrinth fishes
                      - Carangaria (7 families incertae sedis)
                        - Carangiformes* (5) — jacks
                        - Istiophoriformes (2) — barracudas, swordfishes and billfishes
                        - Pleuronectiformes (14) — flatfishes
                    - - Ovalentaria (9 families incertae sedis)
                        - - Cichlomorphae
                            Cichliformes (2) — cichlids
                          - Atherinomorphae
                            - Beloniformes (5) — needlefishes
                            - - Cyprinodontiformes (10) — killifishes
                              - Atheriniformes (10) — silversides
                        - - Mugilomorphae
                            Mugiliformes (1) — mullets
                          - Blenniimorphae
                            - Gobiesociformes (1) — clingfishes
                            - Blenniiformes (6) — blennies
                  - - Eupercaria (14 families incertae sedis)
                      - Gerreiformes (1) —
                      - - - Uranoscopiformes (4) —
                          - Labriformes (1) — wrasses and relatives
                        - - - Ephippiformes (2) —
                            - - - Chaetodontiformes (2) — butterflyfishes and ponyfishes
                                - - Acanthuriformes (3) — surgeonfishes and relatives
                                  - Lutjaniformes (2) — snappers and grunts
                              - - - Lobotiformes (3) —
                                  - Spariformes (3) — breams and porgies
                                - - Priacanthiformes (2) — bigeyes and bandfishes
                                  - - Caproiformes (1) — boarfishes
                                    - - Lophiiformes (18) — anglerfishes
                                      - Tetraodontiformes (10) — plectognaths
                          - - - Pempheriformes (17) —
                              - Centrarchiformes (19) —
                            - Perciformes (61) — perches, mail-cheeked fishes (includes former Scorpaeniformes, Cottiformes, and Trachiniformes)
