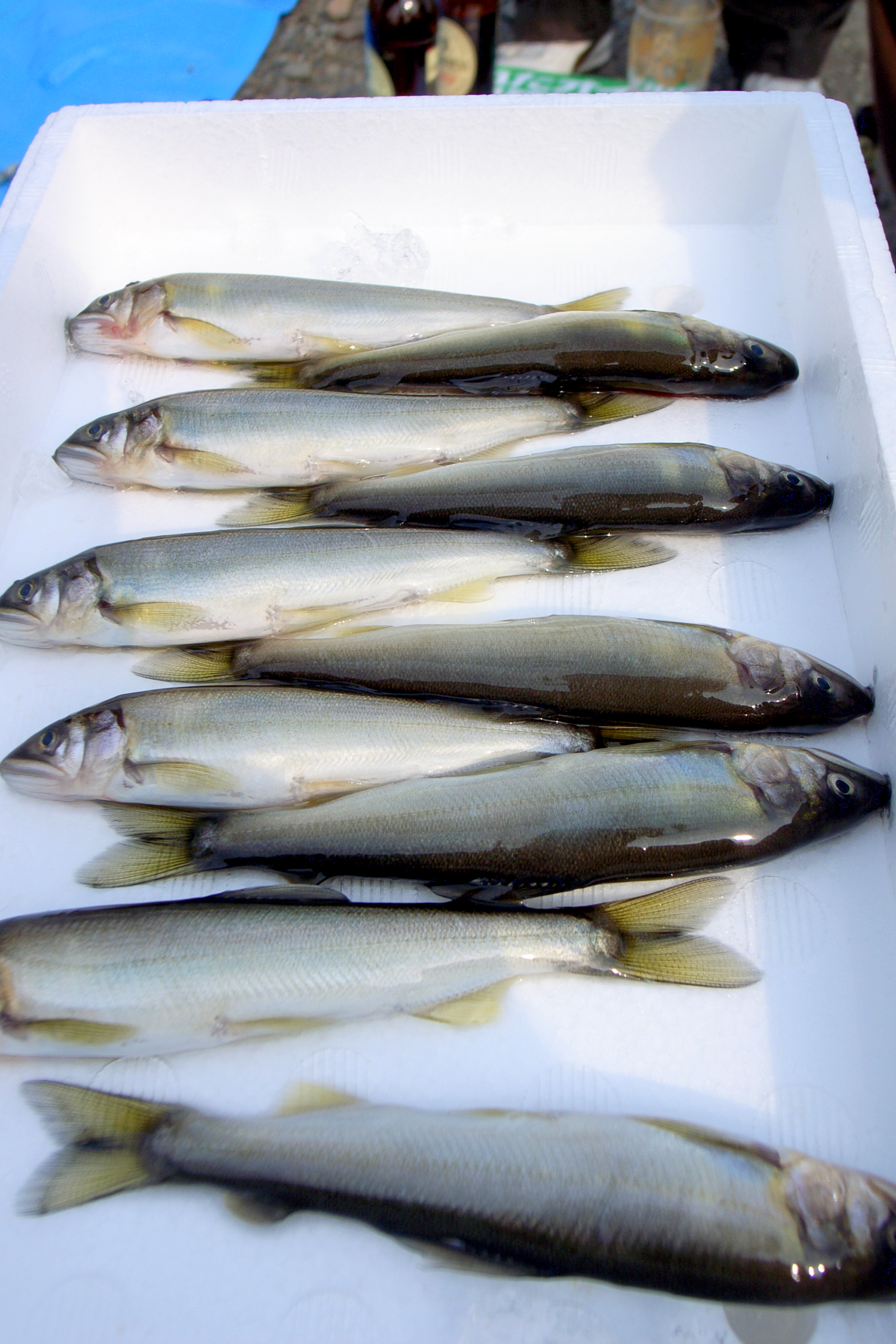
- Ayu (Plecoglossus altivelis: Osmeriformes) in Kawasaki (Kanagawa Prefecture, Japan)

Scientific classification
- Kingdom: Animalia
- Phylum: Chordata
- Class: Actinopterygii
- Cohort: Euteleostei
- Superorder: Protacanthopterygii

Orders
- Argentiniformes; Esociformes; Galaxiiformes; Salmoniformes; Osmeriformes? Stomiiformes? Ateleopodiformes? Alepocephaliformes? Myctophiformes? Aulopiformes? Lepidogalaxiiformes?

= Protacanthopterygii =

Protacanthopterygii Temporal range: Cretaceous to present

Superorder of fishes

Protacanthopterygii is a superorder of ray-finned fish. They inhabit both marine and freshwater habitats. They appear to have evolved in the Cretaceous or perhaps late Jurassic, originating probably roughly 150 million years ago; fossils of them and the closely related Otocephala are known from throughout the Cretaceous.

== Characteristics and origin ==
The Protacanthopterygii contain a number of moderately advanced teleosts. Anatomical and other traits commonly found in this superorder are: more than 24 vertebrae, epicentral cartilages, one supraorbital bone, and a mesocoracoid, an adipose fin, and (often prominent) glossohyal teeth. However, they usually lack a protrusible upper jaw, a gular plate, and proximal forking of the intermuscular bones. Most members of this taxon are rather specialized mid-sized to larger predators of smaller animals.

As a group, they prefer temperate waters and are far more diverse in the Northern Hemisphere than in the Southern. Some are anadromous migrants and many are quite euryhaline. Thus, they likely originated in nearshore or brackish waters of the Northern Hemisphere – theoretically the original protacanthopterygian might have been a catadromous migrant inhabiting fresh water, but given that the basal Otocephala were very likely marine, this seems not so likely. Given that they are widespread in the Holarctic but reached the Southern Hemisphere in the Pacific region, it is more likely than not that they originated in general region of the Turgai Strait and the nearby Tethys Sea – perhaps towards the Eastern Tethys as they never seem to have settled Africa or Atlantic South America.

== Systematics ==
As mentioned initially, one of the closest relatives of the Protacanthopterygii are the Otocephala, which include such different fishes as carp, catfish, and herrings in superorders Clupeomorpha and Ostariophysi. While the core of the present superorder has always consisted of three orders, additional taxa are likely to belong here, but are more disputed.

In recent times, a trend exists to split the Osmeriformes in two, as their supposed suborders do not seem to be particularly closely related among the Protacanthopterygii. The resultant order Argentiniformes contains a number of peculiar deep sea forms. And as it seems, the superorders Cyclosquamata and Stenopterygii, which contain some bizarre apomorphic forms, are so closely related to the "traditional" Protacanthopterygii as to be included therein. Alternatively, the unranked clade name Euteleostei has been proposed for the whole group, but that would require splitting up the Protacanthopterygii lest they become paraphyletic. Thus, up to seven orders might be included here:

Nelson 2006	Betancur-Rodriguez et al. 2016
Protacanthopterygii; Argentiniformes; Alepocephaloidei; Platytroctidae; Alepocephalidae; Leptochilichthyidae; Bathylaconidae; Argentinoidei; Bathylagidae; Microstomatidae; Opisthoproctidae; Argentinidae; Osmeriformes; Galaxoidei; Galaxiidae; Lepidogalaxiidae; Retropinnidae; Osmeroidei; Plecoglossidae; Salangidae; Osmeridae; Esociformes; Salmoniformes; Stenopterygii; Ateleopodiformes; Stomiiformes; Cyclosquamata; Aulopiformes	Alepocephali; Alepocephaliformes; Platytroctidae (Tubeshoulders & searsids); Alepocephalidae (incl. Leptochilichthyidae, Bathylaconidae); Protacanthopterygii s.s.; Argentiniformes; Bathylagidae (smoothtongues & blacksmelts); Microstomatidae (pencilsmelts); Opisthoproctidae (Barreleyes or spookfishes); Argentinidae (argentines, herring smelts); Galaxiiformes; Galaxiidae; Esociformes (mudminnows and Pikes); Salmoniformes (salmons, trouts and allies); Lepidogalaxii; Lepidogalaxiiformes; Lepidogalaxiidae (salamanderfish); Stomiati; Osmeriformes; Retropinnidae; Plecoglossidae (ayu/sweetfish); Salangidae (icefishes or noodlefishes); Osmeridae (Northern Hemisphere smelts); Stomiatiformes (dragonfishes, marine hatchetfishes and allies); Ateleopodia; Ateleopodiformes (jellynose fishes); Cyclosquamata; Aulopiformes (lancetfishes, lizardfishes and allies)

The placement of the Myctophiformes, traditionally held to be close relatives of the Aulopiformes and separated in a superorder "Scopelomorpha", as well as the Lampriformes (the monotypic superorder Lampridiomorpha, and putative relatives of the "Stenopterygii") consequently warrants further study. However, these two seem to be somewhat more advanced and closer to the Paracanthopterygii.

More dubiously, the Cetomimiformes and "Ctenothrissiformes" are sometimes placed here. While they are indeed of uncertain relationships, the former are widely assumed to belong to superorder Acanthopterygii and be closely related to the Stephanoberyciformes. Thus, it is rather unlikely that they are correctly placed here. As regards the latter, it is an entirely fossil group and may well be an invalid paraphyletic assemblage of ancient Teleostei, and in part may indeed belong in the Protacanthopterygii sensu lato.

The supposed family "Macristiidae" was sometimes considered the only extant member of the "Ctenothrissiformes". But actually these are larvae of certain Aulopiformes, as was already suspected when the first "macristiid" was scientifically studied. They were subsequently split as a distinct family and placed in the Osmeriformes. This is interesting in the light of the modern view that these two orders are not nearly as distantly related as they were believed throughout most of the 20th century.

=== Phylogeny ===
The cladogram is based on Betancur-Rodriguez et al. 2016.

- Euteleostei 240mya
  - Lepidogalaxii
    Lepidogalaxiiformes (salamanderfish)
  - - Protacanthopterygii
      - Argentiniformes (marine smelts)
      - - Galaxiiformes (white bait and mudfishes)
        - - Esociformes (pike)
          - Salmoniformes (salmon, trout)
    - - Stomiati
        - Stomiiformes (dragonfish)
        - Osmeriformes (smelt)
      - Neoteleostei
        - Ateleopodia
          Ateleopodidae (jellynoses)
        - Eurypterygia
          - Aulopa
            Aulopiformes (lizardfish)
          - Ctenosquamata
            - Scopelomorpha
              Myctophiformes (lanternfish)
            - Acanthomorpha
