= Ijimaia dofleini =

Conservation status
- Data Deficient (IUCN 3.1)

Scientific classification
- Kingdom: Animalia
- Phylum: Chordata
- Class: Actinopterygii
- Order: Ateleopodiformes
- Family: Ateleopodidae
- Genus: Ijimaia
- Species: I. dofleini

Binomial name
- Ijimaia dofleini Sauter, 1905

Species of fish

Ijimaia dofleini, often called the Ô-shachiburi in Japanese, is a species of ray-finned fish within the family Ateleopodidae. The species is known from four localities in the Pacific Ocean. These localities were in marine waters of the Sagami Sea, Ryukyu Islands, Taiwan, and Society Islands at depths of 300 to 500 metres (980 to 1,640 ft), living near benthopelagic environments on outer continental shelfs and slopes. The species can grow up to lengths of 124 to 170 centimetres (49 to 67 in). It has been assessed as 'Data deficient' by the IUCN Red List in 2018 due to there being limited information on its distribution, population, and ecology.
