= Nansenia oblita =

Scientific classification
- Domain: Eukaryota
- Kingdom: Animalia
- Phylum: Chordata
- Class: Actinopterygii
- Order: Argentiniformes
- Family: Microstomatidae
- Genus: Nansenia
- Species: N. oblita

Binomial name
- Nansenia oblita (Facciolà, 1887)

Synonyms
- Microstoma argenteum oblitum Facciolà, 1887; Microstoma oblitum Facciolà, 1887; Microstoma rissoanum Sarato, 1887

Species of fish

Nansenia oblita, also called the forgotten argentine (from the specific name oblita, "forgotten") or the Mediterranean large-eyed argentine, is a species of fish in the pencil smelt family (Microstomatidae).

== Description ==
Nansenia oblita is silvery in colour. Its length is maximum 18 cm (7.1 in). It has 10 or 11 dorsal soft rays, 9 or 10 anal soft rays, 28–30 gill rakers, 42–45 vertebrae, and 4 branchiostegal rays. The proximal part of the adipose fin is unpigmented and its entire body is covered with guanine. The base of the caudal and procurrent caudal-fin rays are pigmented.

== Habitat ==
Nansenia oblita is pelagic, living in the northwest and eastern Atlantic Ocean, western Mediterranean Sea and Adriatic Sea at depths of 300–500 m (980–1,640 ft). It is commonly found off Messina, Sicily.

== Behaviour ==
It spawns during winter in the Mediterranean, perhaps later in the Atlantic. It lays spherical eggs of about 1.5 mm (0.059 in) diameter. It feeds on zooplankton.
