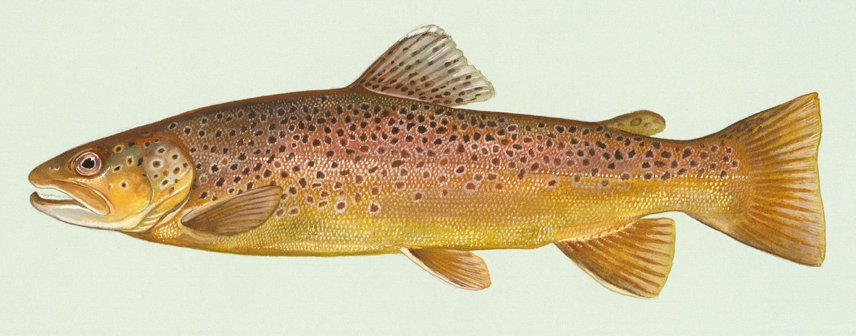
- Brown trout (Salmo trutta)

Scientific classification
- Kingdom: Animalia
- Phylum: Chordata
- Class: Actinopterygii
- Clade: Pan-Euteleostei
- Cohort: Euteleostei; Greenwood et al., 1966

Subdivisions
- See text

Synonyms
- Euteleosteomorpha Greenwood et al., 1966

= Euteleostei =

Euteleostei Temporal range: Hauterivian–present

Clade of ray-finned fishes

Euteleostei, whose members are known as euteleosts, is a clade of bony fishes within Teleostei. The oldest known fossil remains are only from the Early Cretaceous. It is divided into Protacanthopterygii (including the salmon and dragonfish) and Neoteleostei (including the lanternfish, lizardfish, oarfish, and Acanthopterygii).

== Taxonomy ==
The following taxa are known:

- Clade Pan-Euteleostei
  - Genus †Avitosmerus
  - Genus †Barcarenichthys
  - Genus †Beurlenichthys
  - Genus †Casieroides
  - Genus †Chardonius
  - Genus †Erihalcis
  - Genus †Gaudryella
  - Genus †Gharbouria
  - Genus †Helgolandichthys
  - Genus †Parawenzichthys
  - Genus †Santanasalmo
  - Genus †Scombroclupeoides
  - Genus †Tchernovichthys
  - Genus †Wenzichthys
  - Cohort Euteleostei
    - Superorder Lepidogalaxii
    - Superorder Protacanthopterygii
    - Clade Stomiati
    - Clade Neoteleostei

The divergence dates on the cladogram are based on Near et al. (2012), and the topology is based on Betancur-Rodriguez et al. 2016. In the topology of Near et al. (2012), Galaxiiformes were found to be sister to Neoteleostei instead. Near et al. (2012) explored the phylogeny and divergence times of every major lineage, analysing the DNA sequences of 9 unlinked genes. Near et al. also calibrated (set actual values for) branching times in this tree from 36 reliable measurements of absolute time from the fossil record.

- Euteleostei (240 mya)
  - Lepidogalaxii
    Lepidogalaxiiformes (salamanderfish)
  - - Protacanthopterygii (225 mya)
      - Argentiniformes (marine smelts)
      - - Galaxiiformes (white bait and mudfishes)
        - - Esociformes (pike)
          - Salmoniformes (salmon, trout)
    - - Stomiati
        - Stomiiformes (dragonfish)
        - Osmeriformes (smelt)
      - Neoteleostei (175 mya)
        - Ateleopodia
          Ateleopodidae (jellynoses)
        - Eurypterygia
          - Aulopa
            Aulopiformes (lizardfish)
          - Ctenosquamata
            - Scopelomorpha
              Myctophiformes (lanternfish)
            - Acanthomorpha
