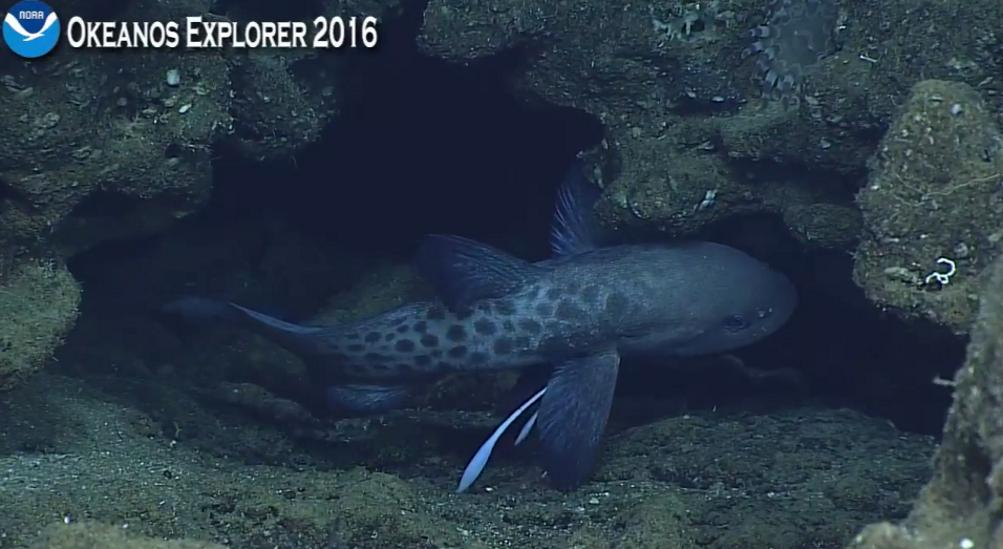
- A photo of Guentherus katoi taken by the NOAA

Conservation status
- Data Deficient (IUCN 3.1)

Scientific classification
- Kingdom: Animalia
- Phylum: Chordata
- Class: Actinopterygii
- Order: Ateleopodiformes
- Family: Ateleopodidae
- Genus: Guentherus
- Species: G. katoi

Binomial name
- Guentherus katoi Senou, Kuwayama & Hirate, 2008

= Guentherus katoi =

Species of fish

Guentherus katoi is a species of fish in the Ateleopodidae family. The fish is only known in Kumanonada Sea, Ryukyu Islands and Kume Island in Japan. The fish was recorded at a length of 69.4 centimeters long (SL).

== Etymology ==
The name katoi is named after Tatsuya Kato who collected the first specimen of the fish.
