= Ijimaia antillarum =

Conservation status
- Least Concern (IUCN 3.1)

Scientific classification
- Kingdom: Animalia
- Phylum: Chordata
- Class: Actinopterygii
- Order: Ateleopodiformes
- Family: Ateleopodidae
- Genus: Ijimaia
- Species: I. antillarum

Binomial name
- Ijimaia antillarum Howell Rivero, 1935

Species of fish

Ijimaia antillarum is a species of ray-finned fish within the family Ateleopodidae. The species has a range off of parts of North and South America in the Atlantic, spanning from New England states to Suriname and Santa Catarina to Tramandai in Brazil off continental slopes, inhabiting benthopelagic environments 320 to 732 meters below sea level. Lengths of the species range from 85.5 to 165 centimeters. The species has been assessed as 'Least concern' in 2019 by the IUCN Red List due to its large range and lack of any known major threats.
