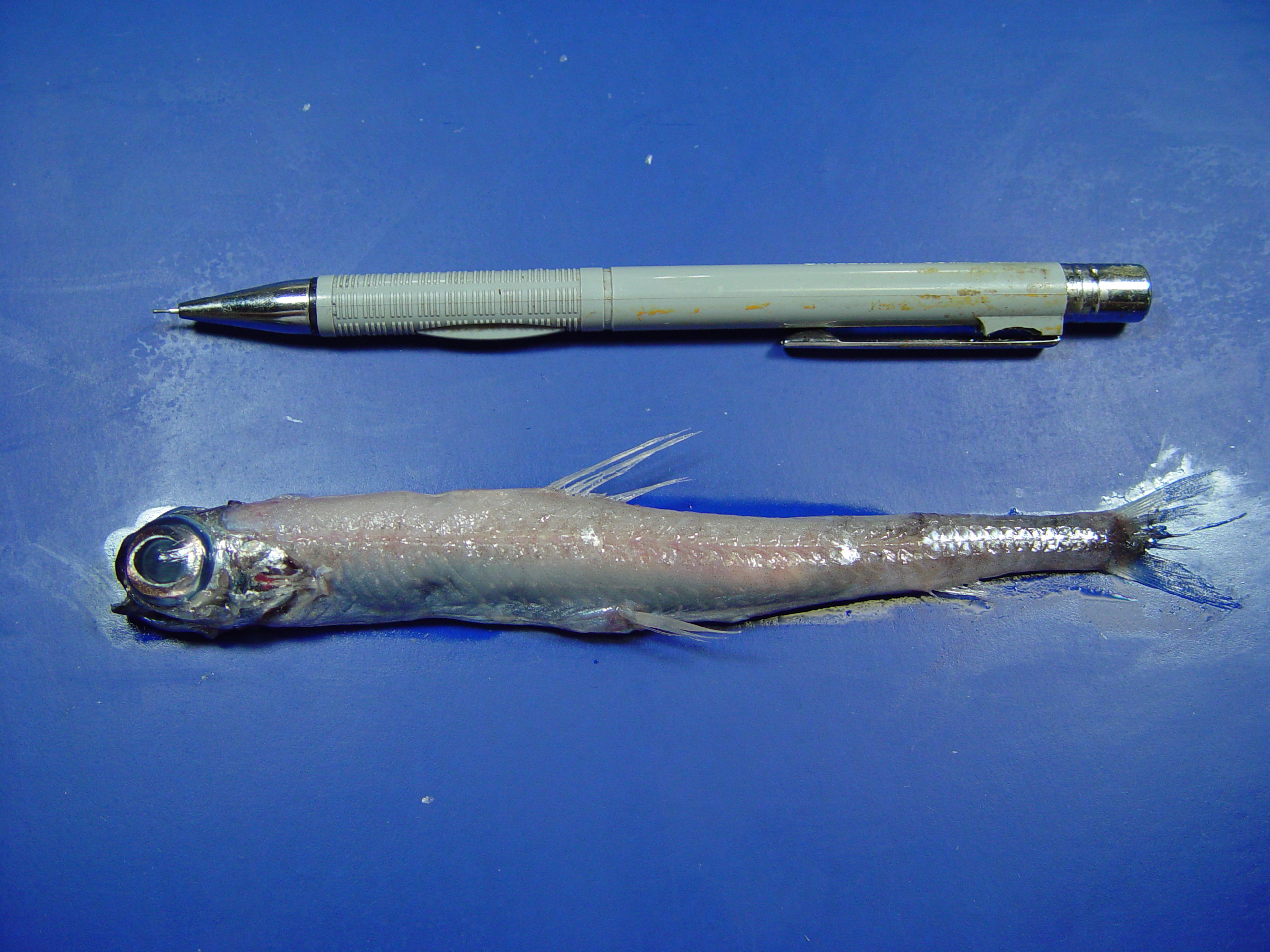
- Greenland argentine pictured next to a ballpoint pen for scale

Conservation status
- Least Concern (IUCN 3.1)

Scientific classification
- Kingdom: Animalia
- Phylum: Chordata
- Class: Actinopterygii
- Order: Argentiniformes
- Family: Microstomatidae
- Genus: Nansenia
- Species: N. groenlandica

Binomial name
- Nansenia groenlandica (J.T. Reinhardt, 1840)

Synonyms
- Microstomus groenlandicus Reinhardt, 1840

= Greenland argentine =

Species of fish

The Greenland argentine (Nansenia groenlandica) or large-eyed argentine is a species of pencil smelt fish.

== Description ==
It maximum length is 24.5 cm (9.6 in). It has 9–10 dorsal soft rays and 8–10 anal soft rays. The ventral fins are inserted ahead of the dorsal fin, which is inserted in front of the midpoint of the body. It has 42–45 vertebrae and adults are silvery in colour, hence the name "argentine." The stomachs and peritoneum are coated with a dark pigment. It has 3 branchiostegal rays (bony rays supporting the gill membranes behind the lower jaw) and 7 or 8 pyloric caecae. It is also noted for its very large eyes.

== Habitat ==
The Greenland argentine lives in the North Atlantic Ocean.

== Behaviour ==
The Greenland argentine spawns mainly in spring and early summer.
