= Nansenia =

Nansenia may refer to:

- Nansenia (fish) - a genus of bony fish
- 853 Nansenia - a minor planet of the Sun system
