= Parateleopus =

Scientific classification
- Kingdom: Animalia
- Phylum: Chordata
- Class: Actinopterygii
- Division: Teleostei
- Order: Ateleopodiformes
- Family: Ateleopodidae
- Genus: Parateleopus; H. M. Smith & Radcliffe, 1912

Type species
- Parateleopus microstomus H. M. Smith & Radcliffe, 1912

Species
- Parateleopus microstomus H. M. Smith & Radcliffe, 1912; Parateleopus indicus Alcock, 1891

Genus of fish

Parateleopus is a genus of jellynose fish in the family Ateleopodidae. There are two recognized species:

- Parateleopus microstomus H. M. Smith & Radcliffe, 1912
- Parateleopus indicus Alcock, 1891 (smallmouth jellynose)

== Species ==
=== Parateleopus microstomus ===
Parateleopus microstomus was first described in 1912, by Hugh McCormick Smith and Lewis Radcliffe. The species was described based on one specimen, the holotype, caught in the Philippines at 503 metres (1,650 ft).

=== Parateleopus indicus ===
Parateleopus indicus was originally described as Ateleopus indicus by Alfred William Alcock in 1891, in the Andaman Sea. It was redescribed as a part of the Parateleopus genus in 2017.
