= Guentherus =

Scientific classification
- Kingdom: Animalia
- Phylum: Chordata
- Class: Actinopterygii
- Order: Ateleopodiformes
- Family: Ateleopodidae
- Genus: Guentherus; Osório, 1917

Genus of jellynose fishes

Guentherus is a genus of jellynose fishes, belonging to the Ateleopodidae family, with two recognized species:

- Guentherus altivela Osório, 1917 (jellynose, highfin tadpole fish)
- Guentherus katoi Senou, Kuwayama & Hirate, 2008

The genus distinguishes itself from others in its family because of discrepancies in morphology. Guentherus has "3 free rays followed by 6–9 normal rays with membrane between them in the pelvic fins." Other genera in this family have "a single long filament or 1 relatively developed ray plus 0 to 3 rudimentary rays."

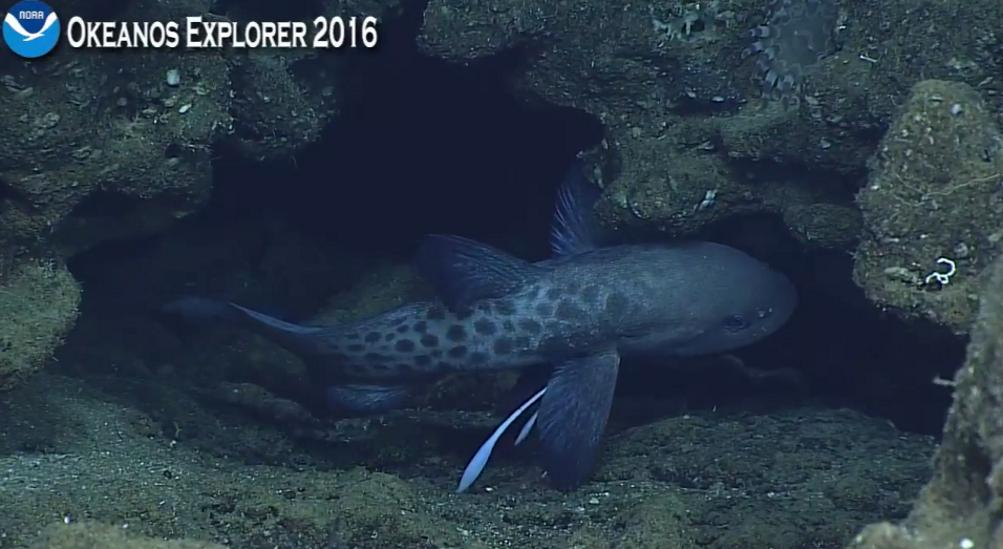
Guentherus katoi

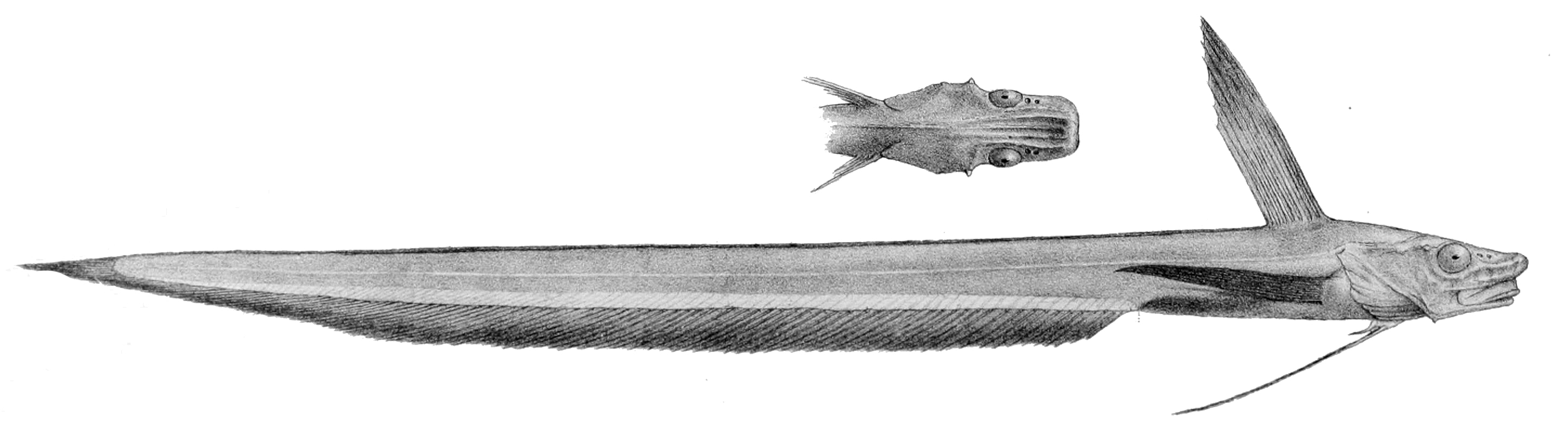
Ateleopus japonicus

== Family: Ateleopodidae ==
The family Ateleopodidae is made up of four genera and within that thirteen species: Ateleopus, Ijimaia, Parateleopus and Guentherus. Ateleopodids are located primarily near tropical and subtropical waters; with Ateleopus, Parateleopus, and Guentherus located in the Pacific and Ijimaia located in the Atlantic.

Scientific Name for Species Under Ateleopodidae Family
| Genus | Species |
|---|---|
| Ateleopus | indicus |
| Ateleopus | purpureus |
| Ateleopus | natalensis |
| Ateleopus | dofleini |
| Ateleopus | plicatellus |
| Ateleopus | japonicus |
| Ateleopus | tanabensis |
| Ataleopus | natalensis |
| Ijimaia | loppei |
| Ijimaia | antillarum |
| Parateleopus | microstomus |
| Guentherus | altivela |
| Guentherus | katoi |

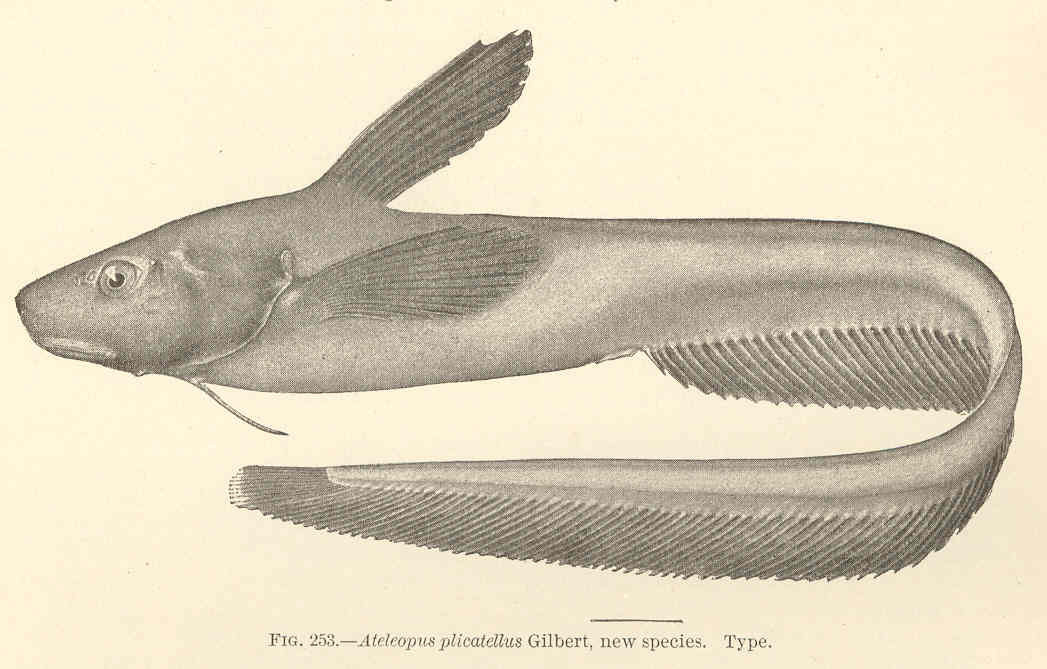
Ateleopus pilcatellus shares the same family as Guentherus. Their distinction being most notable in their fin differentiation.

Ateleopodids are commonly referred to as Jellynose fish or alternatively also called tadpole fish "because of their very soft and gelatinous snout."

== Genus: Guentherus ==
The genus Guentherus was created by Balthazar Osorio in 1917 upon his discovery of Guentherus ativela species. The genus Guentherus differentiates from its other Ateleopodids because of their "posterior placement and structure of its pelvic fins-three free rays followed by a normal pelvic fin." They are a benthically dwelling ray-finned fish. Guentherus ativela is known to feed on copepods and polychaetas.

== Species ==
=== Guentherus katoi ===
==== Distribution ====
Guentherus katoi was named after Tatsuya Kato who collected the specimen. it has been found at depths of 1,000–2,000 feet (300–610 m). The only specimens of G. katoi have been found off the coast of Southern Japan to the outlying southern Okinawa Islands.

=== Physical description ===
G. katoi is a scaleless Actinopterygii species with jaws, though lacking teeth.

- “Head and body pale pink, covered with many reddish to dark brown spots on nape to the lateral side of body.”
- “Dorsal fin reddish brown in lower half, blackish distally; some small dark brown spots on the basal part of dorsal fin.”
- “Pectoral fins reddish brown, blackish distally, and grayish in the lower part. Pelvic fins blackish except for 3 white, free rays.”

==== Defining characteristics ====
G. katoi can be distinguished from other species in its genus because of its lack of lateral line and scales.

=== Guentherus altivela ===
Guentherus altivela Osório, 1917, original description in Osório, B. (1917). "Nota sôbre algumas espécies de peixes que vivem no Atlântico ocidental" [Note on some species of fish living in the western Atlantic]. Arquivo da Universidade de Lisboa. 4: 103–131, Pls. 29-36.

== Bibliography ==
- Gerringer, M. E.; Drazen J. C.; Linley, T. D.; Summers, A. P.; Jamieson, A. J.; Yancey, P. H. (2017). "Distribution, composition and functions of gelatinous tissues in deep-sea fishes". Royal Society Open Science. 4 (12). doi:10.1098/rsos.171063. PMC 5750012. PMID 29308245.
- Prokofiev, A. M. (2006). "New finding of Ateleopus purpureus Tanaka, 1915 (Ateleopodiformes: Ateleopodidae) in the Pacific waters of Japan". Journal of Ichthyology. 46 (4): 342–344. Bibcode:2006JIch...46..342P. doi:10.1134/S0032945206040072.
