= Chardonius =

Chardonius Temporal range: Aptian or Albian

Scientific classification
- Kingdom: Animalia
- Phylum: Chordata
- Class: Actinopterygii
- Cohort: Euteleostei
- Genus: †Chardonius; Taverne, 1975
- Species: †C. longicaudatus

Binomial name
- †Chardonius longicaudatus Taverne, 1975

Extinct genus of fishes

Chardonius is an extinct genus of prehistoric freshwater ray-finned fish from the late Aptian or early Albian. It contains a single species, C. longicaudatus, from the Loia Beds of the Democratic Republic of the Congo.

Its taxonomic placement is uncertain, and it has been alternatively classified as a "clupeoid" or a "salmoniform". The latter classification is now thought to be a wastebasket treatment. It is currently considered an indeterminate euteleost.

Morphologically, it is notable for the extreme anterior insertion point of its dorsal fin compared to the anal fin.

== See also ==
- Prehistoric fish
- List of prehistoric bony fish
