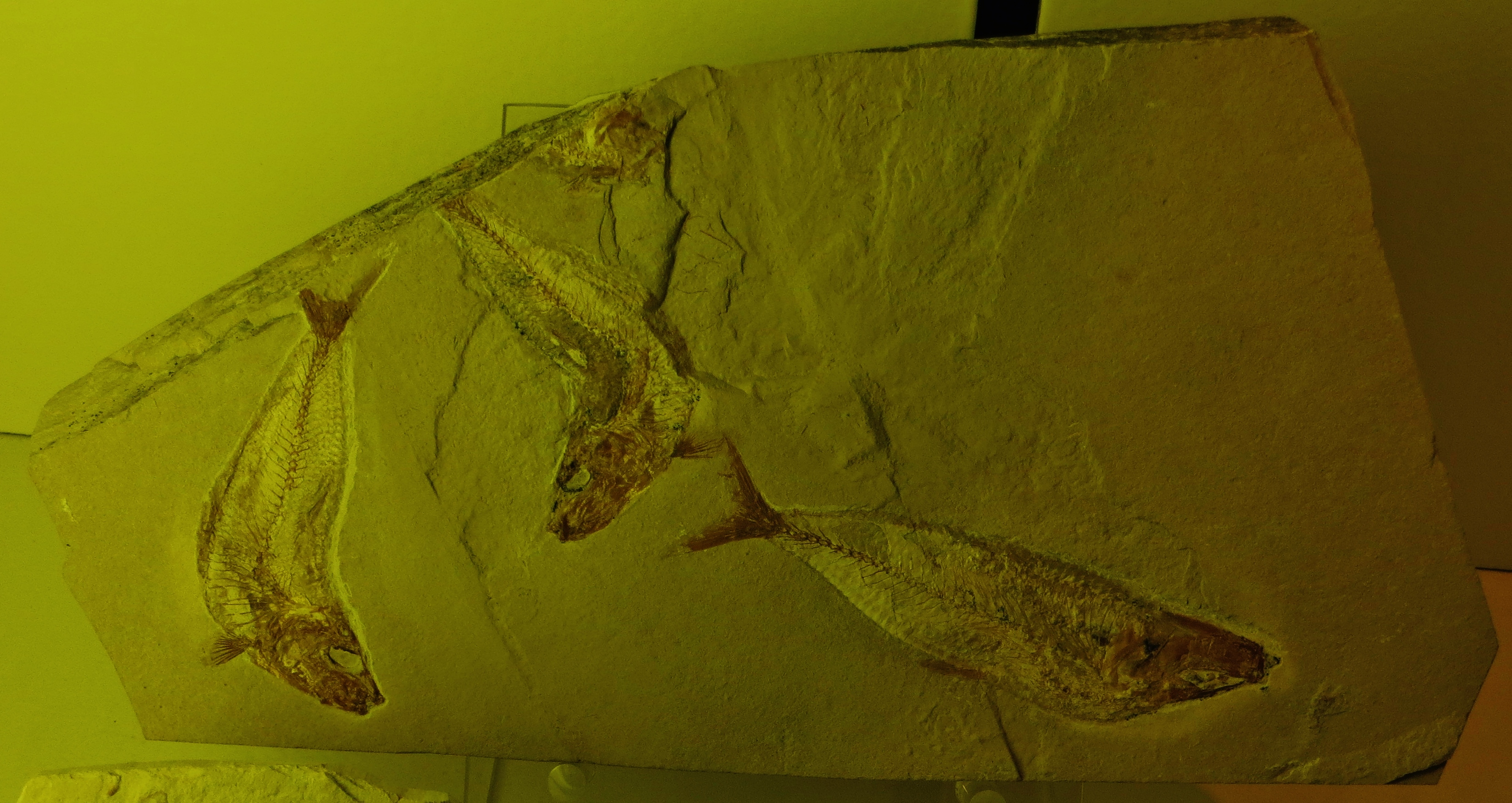
- Gaudryella gaudryi

Scientific classification
- Kingdom: Animalia
- Phylum: Chordata
- Class: Actinopterygii
- Cohort: Euteleostei
- Genus: †Gaudryella; Patterson, 1970
- Species: †G. gaudryi

Binomial name
- †Gaudryella gaudryi (Pictet & Humbert, 1866)

= Gaudryella =

Gaudryella Temporal range: Cenomanian

Extinct genus of fishes

Gaudryella is an extinct genus of prehistoric marine ray-finned fish that lived during the Late Cretaceous. It contains a single species, G. gaudryi, from the Cenomanian-aged Sannine Formation of Lebanon. It is thought to be a basal euteleostean of uncertain affinities.
