= Photostomias liemi =

Conservation status
- Least Concern (IUCN 3.1)

Scientific classification
- Domain: Eukaryota
- Kingdom: Animalia
- Phylum: Chordata
- Class: Actinopterygii
- Order: Stomiiformes
- Family: Stomiidae
- Genus: Photostomias
- Species: P. liemi

Binomial name
- Photostomias liemi Kenaley, 2009

Species of fish

Photostomias liemi is a species of rarely-seen barbeled dragonfish in the genus Photostomias. The species has been documented in the Pacific Ocean, and fully-grown members of the species can reach a maximum length of ~14.3 centimeters.
