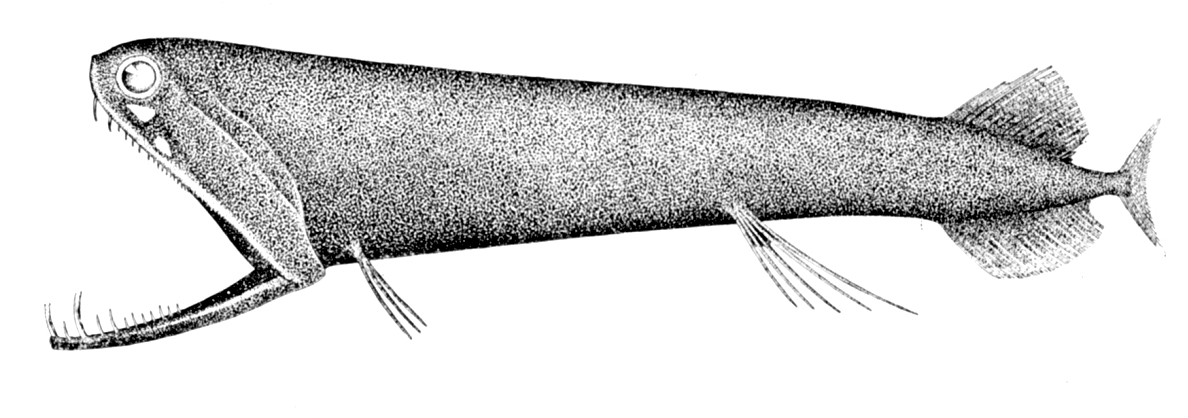
- Illustration of a stoplight loosejaw (M. niger)

Scientific classification
- Kingdom: Animalia
- Phylum: Chordata
- Class: Actinopterygii
- Cohort: Euteleostei
- Clade: Stomiati

Orders
- Osmeriformes; Stomiiformes

= Stomiati =

Clade of fishes

Stomiati is a clade of teleost fish belonging to the cohort (group) Euteleostei, which is a group of bony fishes within the infra-class Teleostei that evolved ~240 million years ago. Teleostei is a group of ray-finned fishes with the exception of primitive bichirs, sturgeons, paddlefishes, freshwater garfishes, and bowfins. The cohort of Euteleostei is divided into two smaller groups: the Protacanthopterygii and the Neoteleostei. Stomiati happen to be descendants of the Protacanthopterygii, and contains the order of Osmeriformes and Stomiiformes.

Stomiati is one of five major euteleost lineages that were recently placed in one monophyly, a group of organisms all descending from one common ancestor. The five being a clade formed by Esociformes and Salmoniformes; second being the Stomiatii consisting of only Osmeriformes and Stomiiformes; Argentiniformes (excludes Alepocephaliformes); Galaxiiformes (excludes Lepidogalaxias); and Neotelestei. Stomiati are known for their large mouth, long throat/barbel, and no caudal filament.

== Osmeriformes ==
Osmeriformes smelts belong to the subcohort Protacanthopterygii. Osmeriformes mainly spawn in freshwater habitats except for the osmerid (family Osmeridae) Osmerus eperlanus, and one or two salangids (family Salangidae). Fourteen different families comprise the order of Osmeriformes.

== Stomiiformes ==
Stomiiformes are an order of deep sea ray-finned fishes. These fishes are known, and named, for their large mouth openings. Stomiiformes is derived from Ancient Greek meaning “mouth” + “external form” which references their large mouth openings. Four (some may claim 5) different families comprise the order of Stomiiformes.

=== Bioluminescence ===
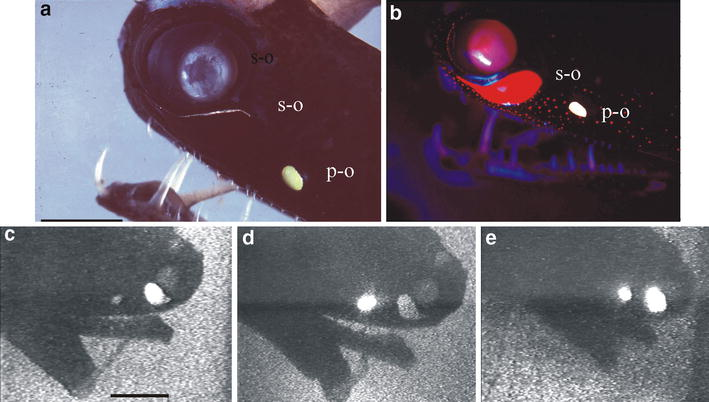
Red bioluminescent light from M. niger.

The order of stomiiformes is linked to some of the most interesting deep sea dragonfishes. The genera of Malacosteus, Aristostomias and Pachystomias are the only fishes that have the ability to produce red bioluminescence. The species Malacosteus niger is found lurking below a depth of 500 m (1,600 ft) illuminating its red light in order pick out prey. The reason this red bioluminescent light is so interesting is the fact that below the depth of 500 meters, there are very few organisms that have the ability to perceive this wavelength. Therefore, M. niger effortlessly hunts for prey with the aid of light while its prey remains in seemingly complete darkness.

Little is known about their ability to use and let alone sense light at such depths. Due to them lurking at a depth well below 500 m, they can only be observed in their natural habitat, and bringing one up to the surface alive is infeasible. The change in pressure the fish would experience would be too great and most certainly be fatal.
