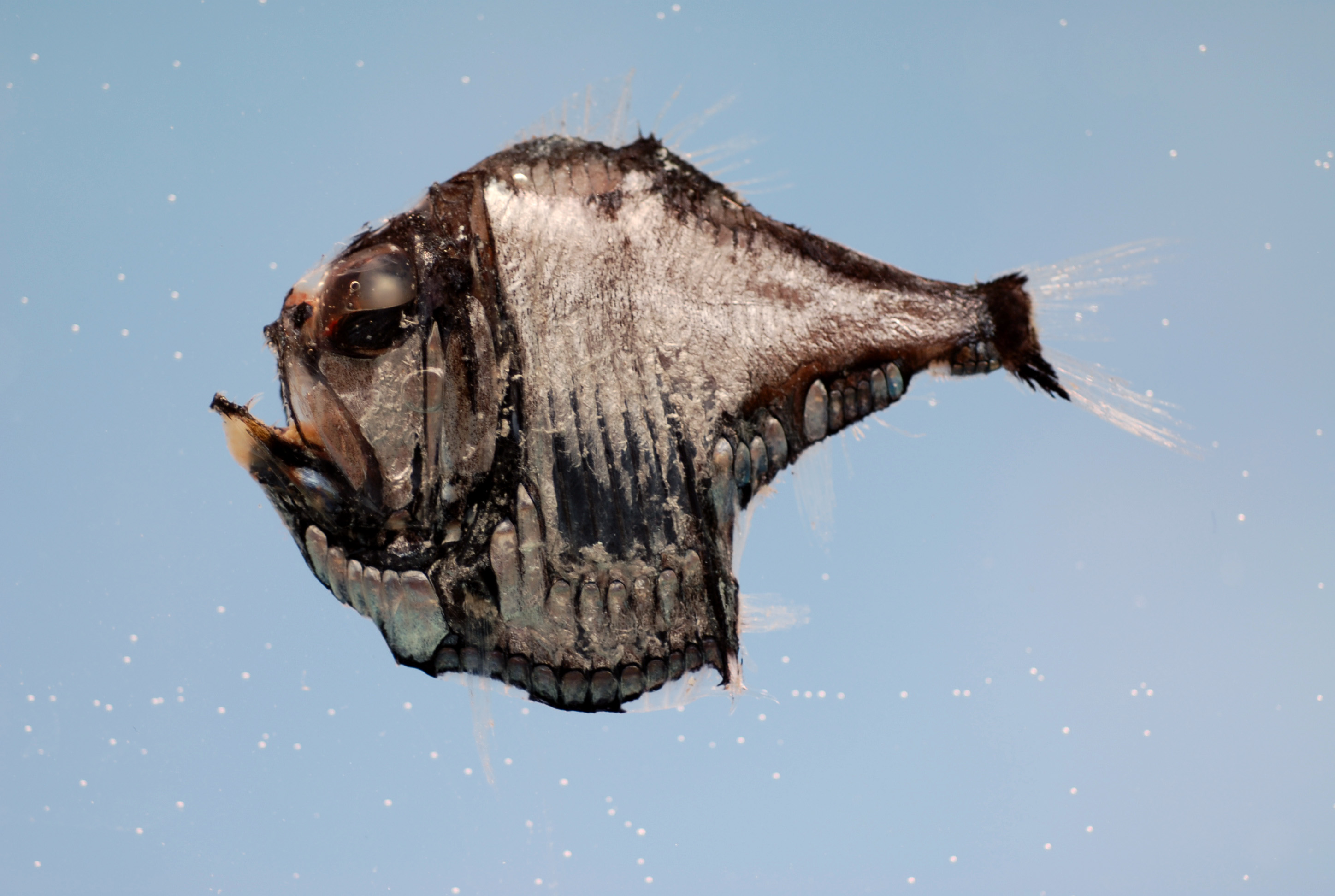
- Argyropelecus aculeatus (Sternoptychinae)

Scientific classification
- Domain: Eukaryota
- Kingdom: Animalia
- Phylum: Chordata
- Class: Actinopterygii
- Division: Teleostei
- Superorder: Stenopterygii

Orders
- Ateleopodiformes (but see text) Stomiiformes

Synonyms
- Atelopodomorpha (but see text)

= Stenopterygii =

Superorder of fishes

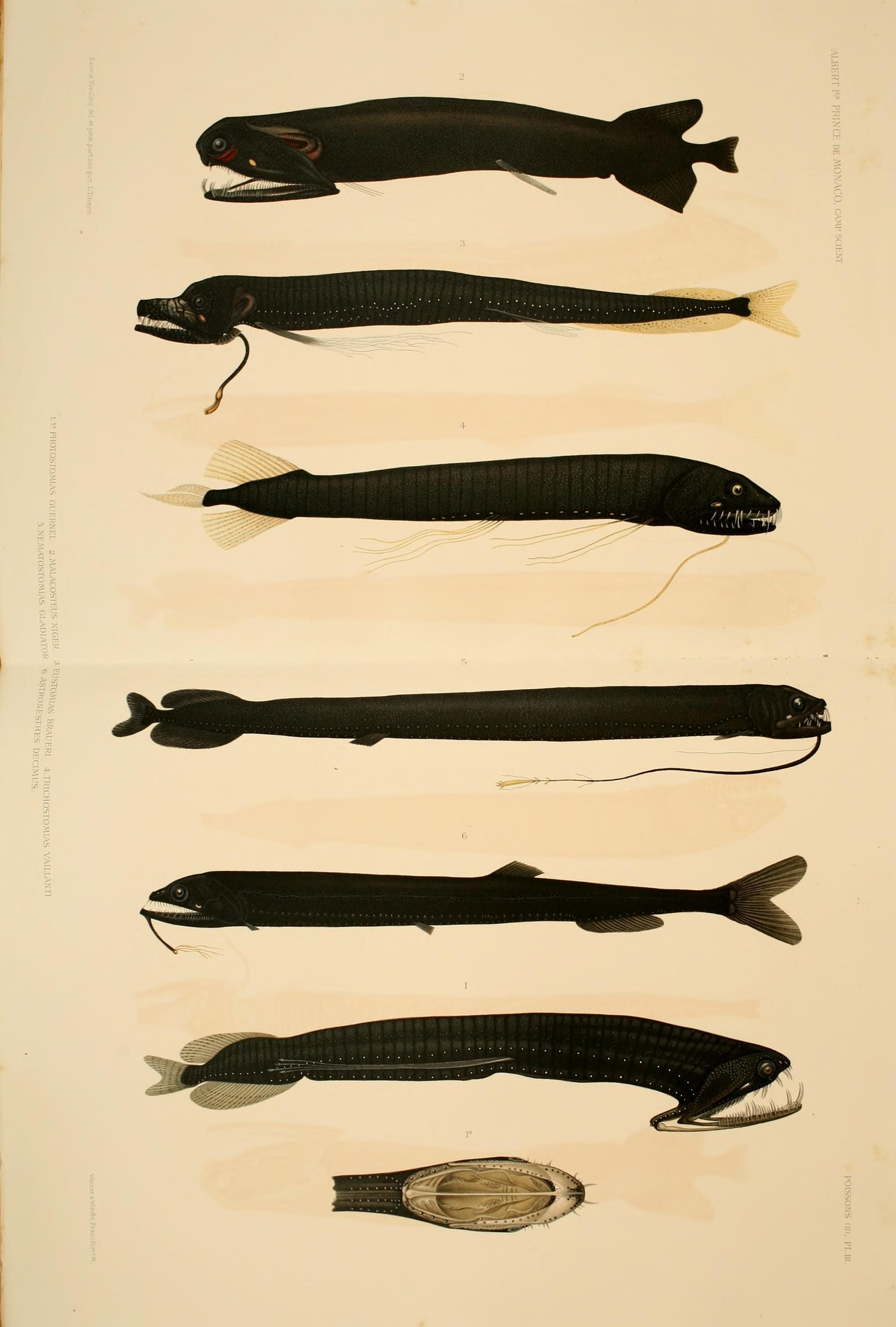
Stomiidae (Stomiiformes), from top to bottom: Northern Stoplight Loosejaw (Malacosteus niger), Eustomias braueri, Bathophilus vaillanti, Leptostomias gladiator, Rhadinesthes decimus, Photostomias guernei and its mouth

Stenopterygii are a superorder of ray-finned fish in the infraclass Teleostei. Their validity is somewhat doubtful, as the group was established to separate, out of a large group of closely related Teleostei, a mere two rather peculiarly autapomorphic orders at best. In some treatments, it is even monotypic.

As originally conceived, the "Stenopterygii" include the Ateleopodiformes and Stomiiformes. Sometimes, the former are removed to form a monotypic superorder Ateleopodomorpha. These lineages are moderately advanced teleosts, but each is uniquely adapted to a deep-water oceanic environment. Their plesiomorphies are similar to the Salmoniformes and other Protacanthopterygii, but plesiomorphic traits are no reliable indicator of a close relationship. Nonwithstanding, the "Stenopterygii" appear to be close relatives of the Protacanthopterygii. Some cladistic analyses find at least the Stomiiformes deep within the latter superorder.

It thus cannot be ruled out that the "Stenopterygii" are better included in the Protacanthopterygii. An alternative approach is to consider the entire group – "Stenopterygii", Protacanthopterygii, the monotypic superorders "Cyclosquamata", and perhaps the monotypic superorders "Lampridiomorpha" and "Scopelomorpha" – an unranked clade named Euteleostei. But this would probably require splitting up the Protacanthopterygii, so that each euteleost superorder would at most contain 2 orders (though most would be monotypic), as the relative placement of all these groups is not very well resolved. Such a profusion of monotypic taxa is generally rejected by modern taxonomy, if it is not absolutely required to adequately reflect phylogeny.

Moreover, owing to the uncertain relationships of the euteleosts to the less advanced Otocephala (which include the superorders Clupeomorpha and Ostariophysi) and the more advanced teleosts (e.g. Acanthopterygii), it may well be that the supposed "clade" is merely an evolutionary grade. Such a paraphyletic group would according to modern understanding not warrant a taxon name at all. In this case, a possible solution would be to expand the Protacanthopterygii to subsume all the small "superorders", and to treat the Euteleostei as including the Protacanthopterygii and their more "modern" relatives.
