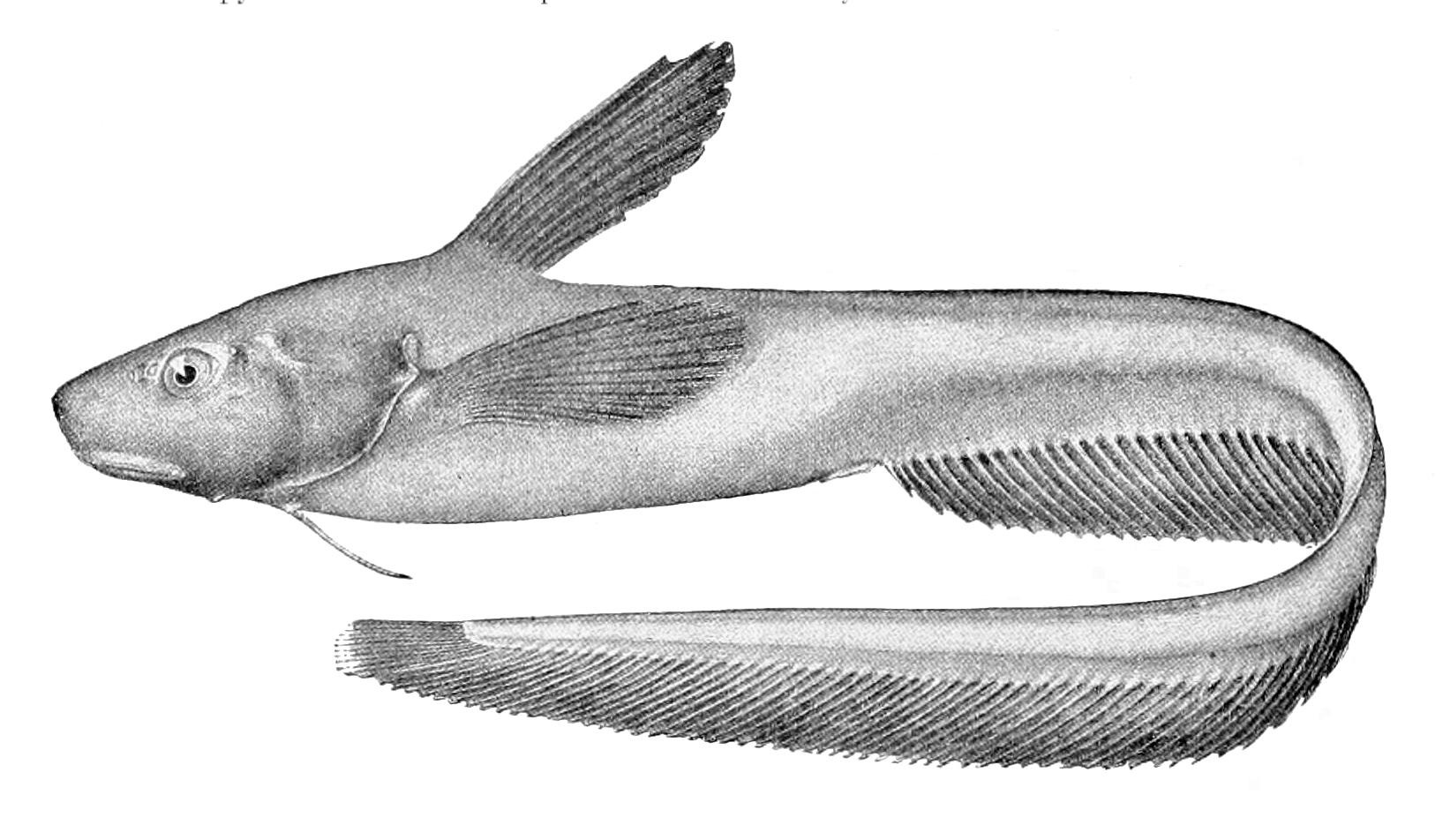

Conservation status
- Least Concern (IUCN 3.1)

Scientific classification
- Domain: Eukaryota
- Kingdom: Animalia
- Phylum: Chordata
- Class: Actinopterygii
- Order: Ateleopodiformes
- Family: Ateleopodidae
- Genus: Ijimaia
- Species: I. plicatellus

Binomial name
- Ijimaia plicatellus Gilbert, 1905

= Ijimaia plicatellus =

Species of jellynose fish

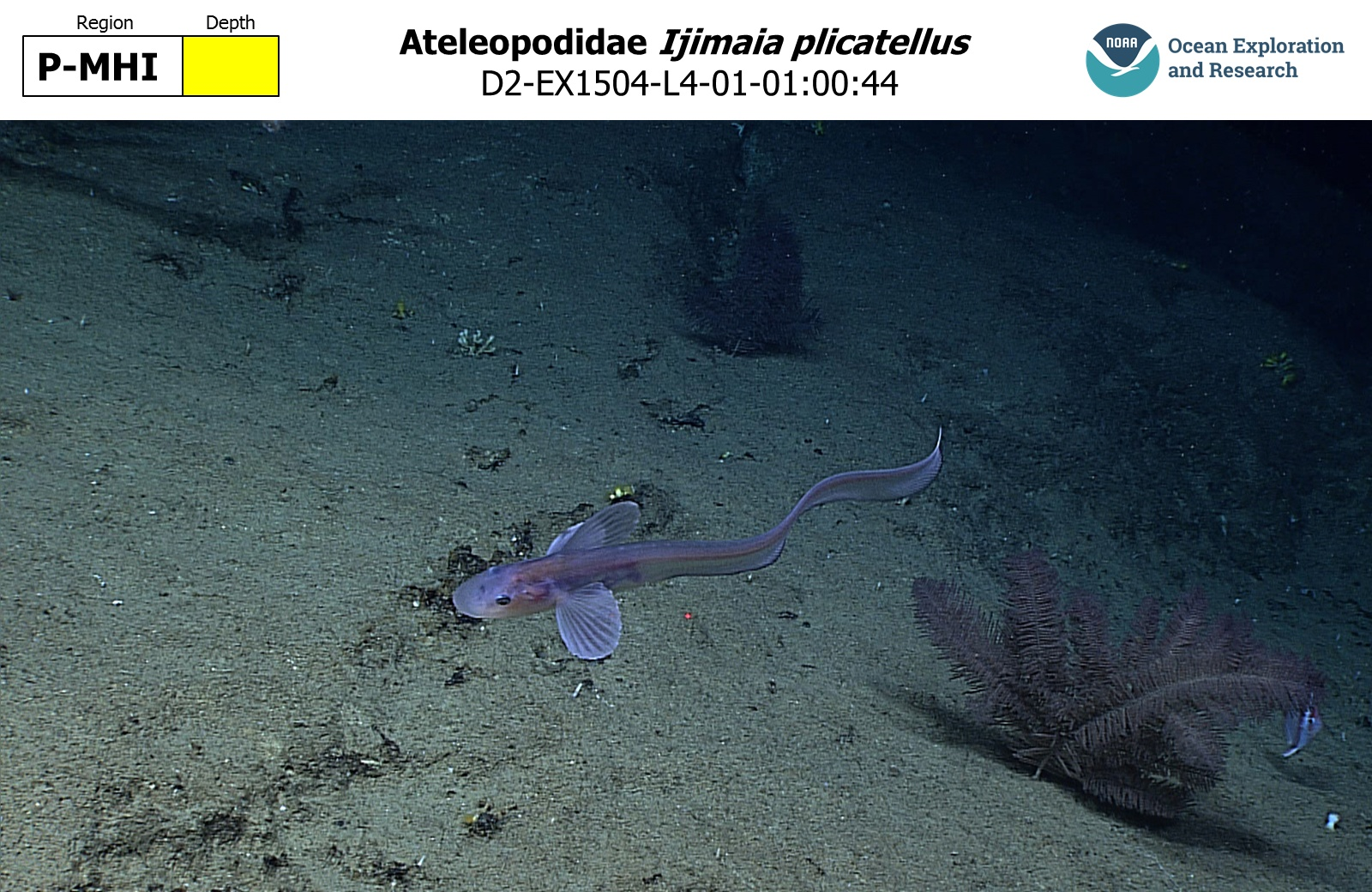
Image of I. plicatellus captured at near Hawaii by the Okeanos Explorer at a depth of 329 meters.

Ijimaia plicatellus is a species of jellynose fish in the family Ateleopodidae. Their distribution is in the Eastern Central Pacific near Hawaii, at depths from 265 to 500 meters. The species can reach up to 68 centimeters in length.
