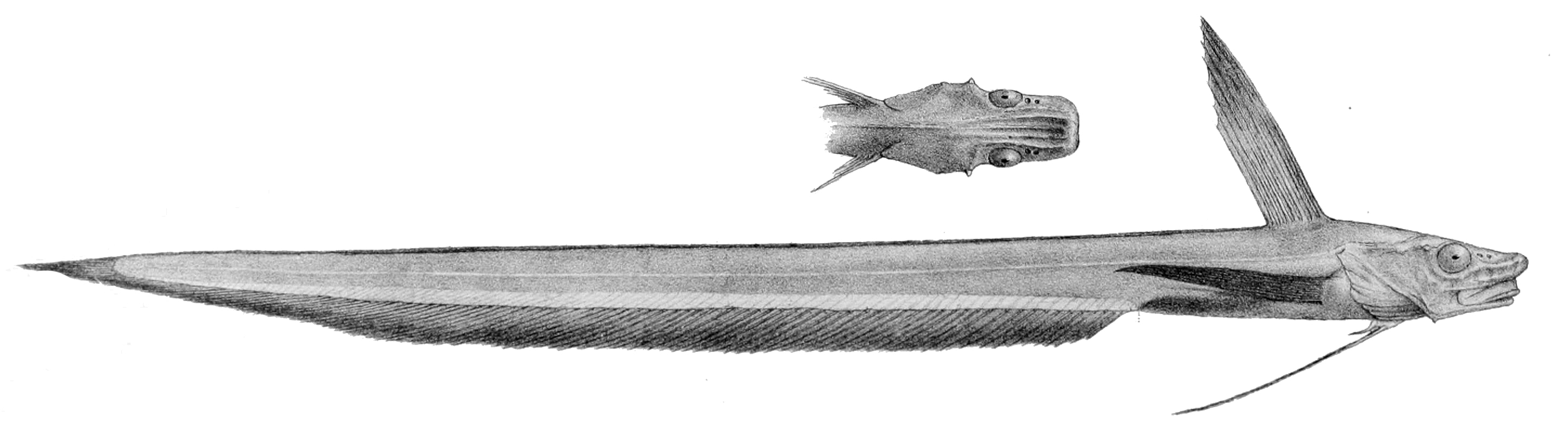

Conservation status
- Least Concern (IUCN 3.1)

Scientific classification
- Kingdom: Animalia
- Phylum: Chordata
- Class: Actinopterygii
- Order: Ateleopodiformes
- Family: Ateleopodidae
- Genus: Ateleopus
- Species: A. japonicus

Binomial name
- Ateleopus japonicus Bleeker, 1853

= Pacific jellynose fish =

Species of fish

The pacific jellynose fish (Ateleopus japonicus) (Shachiburi, 鯱振 in Japanese) is a species of jellynose fish in the family Ateleopodidae. It can grow up to a length of 95 cm, but is more commonly found at lengths of 35 cm. There is one other species in its genus. It feeds on prawns, and is harmless to humans. It is benthic, and lives at depths from 140 to 600 meters, but it may rise up to 100 meters at night, in areas like China, Japan, Malaysia, New Caledonia, Taiwan, and Vietnam in the Indo-Pacific. It is a rare fish to encounter, and its population seems to be stable, but it may be a bycatch in fisheries.
