= Photostomias lucingens =

Conservation status
- Data Deficient (IUCN 3.1)

Scientific classification
- Domain: Eukaryota
- Kingdom: Animalia
- Phylum: Chordata
- Class: Actinopterygii
- Order: Stomiiformes
- Family: Stomiidae
- Genus: Photostomias
- Species: P. lucingens

Binomial name
- Photostomias lucingens Kenaley, 2009

Species of fish

Photostomias lucigens is a species of barbeled dragonfish in the genus Photostomias. The species has been observed in the southern Pacific and Atlantic oceans, and fully-grown members of the species can reach a maximum length of 11 centimeters.
