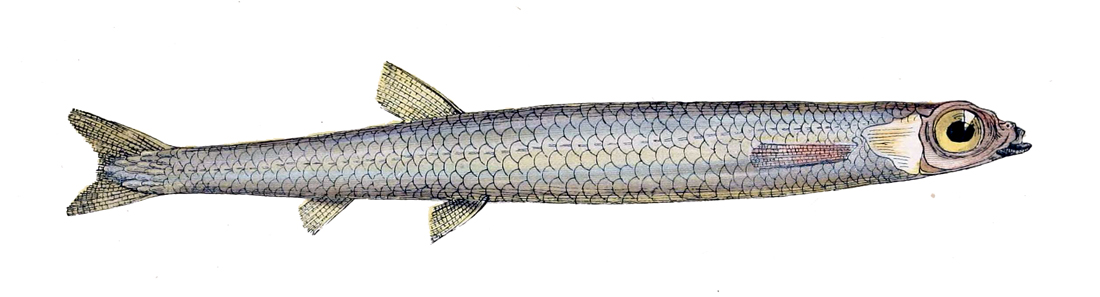

Conservation status
- Least Concern (IUCN 3.1)

Scientific classification
- Kingdom: Animalia
- Phylum: Chordata
- Class: Actinopterygii
- Division: Teleostei
- Order: Argentiniformes
- Family: Microstomatidae
- Genus: Microstoma
- Species: M. microstoma

Binomial name
- Microstoma microstoma (A. Risso, 1810)

= Slender argentine =

Species of fish

The slender argentine, Microstoma microstoma, is a species of pencil smelt, found around the world in tropical and subtropical areas. This species grows to a length of 21 centimetres (8.3 in) TL.
