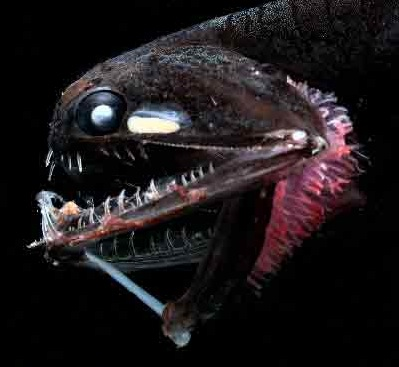

Conservation status
- Data Deficient (IUCN 3.1)

Scientific classification
- Kingdom: Animalia
- Phylum: Chordata
- Class: Actinopterygii
- Order: Stomiiformes
- Family: Stomiidae
- Genus: Photostomias
- Species: P. goodyeari

Binomial name
- Photostomias goodyeari Kenaley & Hartel, 2005

= Photostomias goodyeari =

Species of fish

Photostomias goodyeari is a species of barbeled dragonfish in the genus Photostomias. The species has been observed in the Atlantic Ocean, specifically in the Gulf of Mexico, and fully grown members of the species can reach a maximum of ~17.5 centimeters in length.
