= Natlandia =

Natlandia Temporal range: Maastrichtian

Scientific classification
- Kingdom: Animalia
- Phylum: Chordata
- Class: Actinopterygii
- Order: Salmoniformes
- Genus: †Natlandia; David, 1946

Extinct genus of fishes

Natlandia is an extinct genus of prehistoric bony fish that lived during the Maastrichtian stage of the Late Cretaceous epoch.

== See also ==
- Prehistoric fish
- List of prehistoric bony fish
