= Photostomias tantillux =

Conservation status
- Least Concern (IUCN 3.1)

Scientific classification
- Domain: Eukaryota
- Kingdom: Animalia
- Phylum: Chordata
- Class: Actinopterygii
- Order: Stomiiformes
- Family: Stomiidae
- Genus: Photostomias
- Species: P. tantillux

Binomial name
- Photostomias tantillux Kenaley, 2009

Species of fish

Photostomias tantillux is a species of barbeled dragonfish in the genus Photostomias. The species has been documented in the Pacific Ocean off the coast of Japan, and fully-grown members of the species can reach a maximum length of ~10.1 centimeters.
