= Helgolandichthys =

Helgolandichthys Temporal range: Early Aptian

Scientific classification
- Kingdom: Animalia
- Phylum: Chordata
- Class: Actinopterygii
- Cohort: Euteleostei
- Genus: †Helgolandichthys; Taverne, 1981
- Species: †H. schmidi

Binomial name
- †Helgolandichthys schmidi Taverne, 1981

Extinct genus of fishes

Helgolandichthys is an extinct genus of prehistoric marine ray-finned fish that lived during the Early Cretaceous of Europe. It contains a single species, H. schmidi from the early Aptian of Helgoland, Germany. Initially considered an early salmoniform, it is now thought to be a basal euteleost of uncertain affinities.

== See also ==
- Prehistoric fish
- List of prehistoric bony fish
