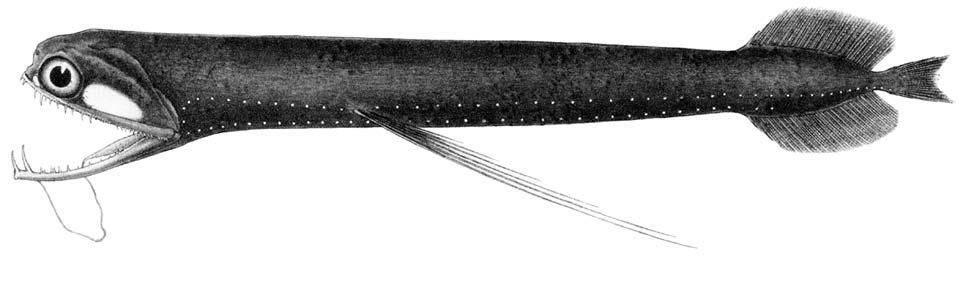

Conservation status
- Least Concern (IUCN 3.1)

Scientific classification
- Kingdom: Animalia
- Phylum: Chordata
- Class: Actinopterygii
- Order: Stomiiformes
- Family: Stomiidae
- Genus: Photostomias
- Species: P. atrox

Binomial name
- Photostomias atrox (Alcock, 1890)

= Photostomias atrox =

Species of fish

Photostomias atrox is a species of barbeled dragonfish in the genus Photostomias. The species has been documented in the Atlantic and Pacific oceans, and fully-grown members of the species can reach a maximum length of ~15.4 centimeters.
