= Gharbouria =

Gharbouria Temporal range: Cenomanian

Scientific classification
- Kingdom: Animalia
- Phylum: Chordata
- Class: Actinopterygii
- Cohort: Euteleostei
- Genus: †Gharbouria; Gayet, 1988
- Species: †G. libanica

Binomial name
- †Gharbouria libanica Gayet, 1988

Extinct genus of fishes

Gharbouria is an extinct genus of prehistoric marine ray-finned fish that lived during the Late Cretaceous. It contains a single species, G. libanica, from the Cenomanian-aged Sannine Formation of Lebanon. It is thought to be a basal euteleostean of uncertain affinities.

== See also ==
- Prehistoric fish
- List of prehistoric bony fish
