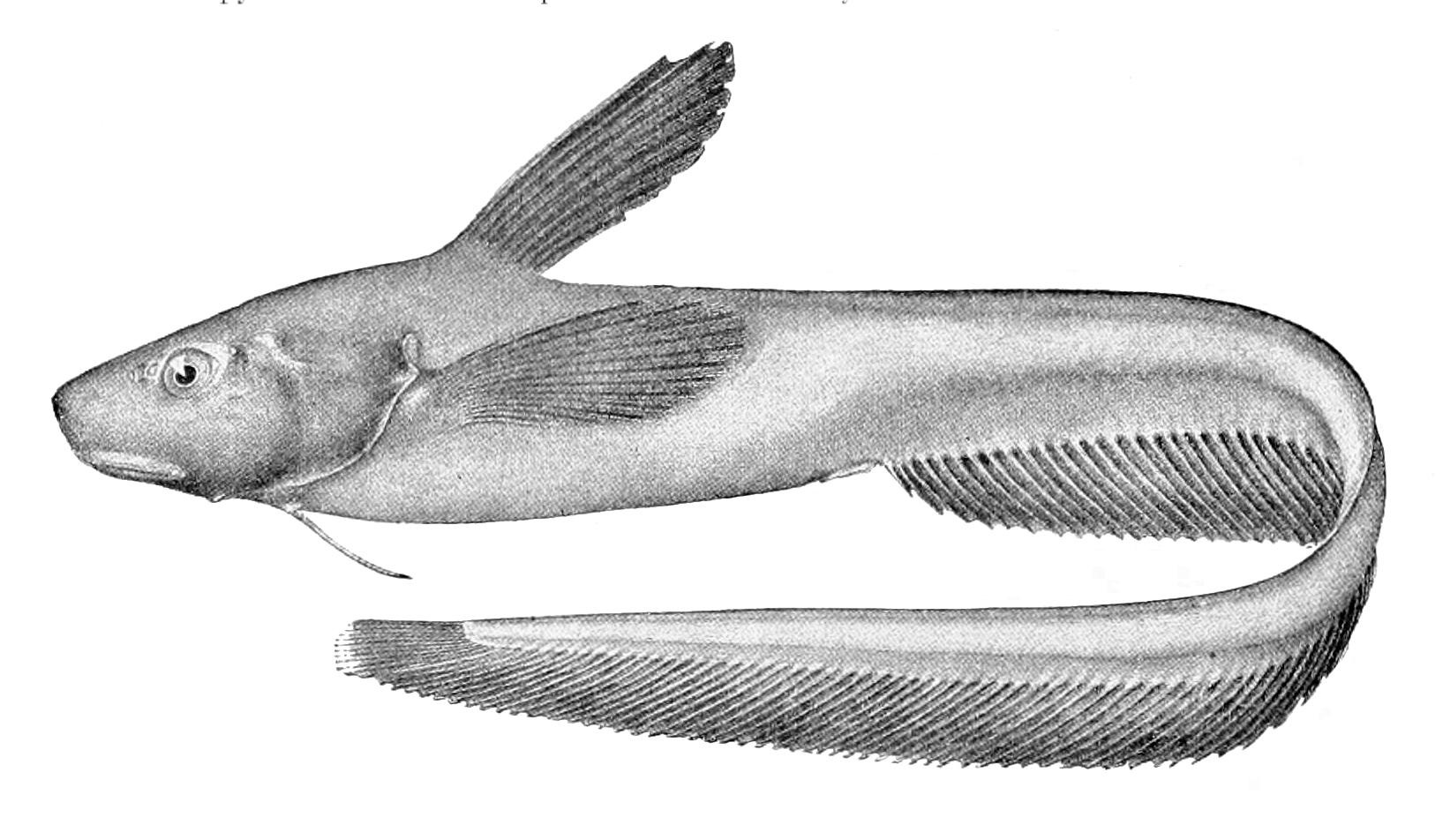
- Deep-water ateleopid fish (I. plicatellus)

Scientific classification
- Kingdom: Animalia
- Phylum: Chordata
- Class: Actinopterygii
- Order: Ateleopodiformes
- Family: Ateleopodidae
- Genus: Ijimaia; Sauter, 1905

= Ijimaia =

Ijimaia Temporal range: 14.2–0 Ma Middle Miocene to Present

Genus of jellynose fishes

Ijimaia is a genus of jellynose fishes, one of four in the order Ateleopodiformes. The genus occurs in the fossil record since the Middle Miocene.

== Species ==
The currently recognized species in this genus are:

- Ijimaia antillarum Howell-Rivero, 1935
- Ijimaia dofleini Sauter, 1905
- Ijimaia fowleri Howell-Rivero, 1935
- Ijimaia loppei Roule, 1922 (Loppe's tadpole fish)
- Ijimaia plicatellus (C. H. Gilbert, 1905) (deepwater ateleopodid)
