= Xenophthalmichthys =

Scientific classification
- Kingdom: Animalia
- Phylum: Chordata
- Class: Actinopterygii
- Order: Argentiniformes
- Family: Microstomatidae
- Genus: Xenophthalmichthys; Regan, 1925
- Species: X. danae

Binomial name
- Xenophthalmichthys danae Regan, 1925

Species of fish

Xenophthalmichthys danae is a species of pencil smelt found in deep waters to 1,250 metres (4,100 ft). This species has been found in the western Pacific Ocean and the Atlantic Ocean and is suspected to be circumtropical. This species grows to a length of 88 millimetres (3.5 in) SL.
