= Parawenzichthys =

Parawenzichthys Temporal range: Turonian

Scientific classification
- Domain: Eukaryota
- Kingdom: Animalia
- Phylum: Chordata
- Class: Actinopterygii
- Order: Argentiniformes
- Family: Argentinidae
- Genus: †Parawenzichthys de Figueiredo, Gallo, & Delarmelina 2012

Type species
- †P. minor

Extinct genus of fishes

Parawenzichthys is an extinct genus of protacanthopterygian fish containing the single species Parawenzichthys minor, known from the Turonian age Atlântida Formation in the Pelotas Basin in southern Brazil.
