= Barcarenichthys =

Barcarenichthys Temporal range: Late Cenomanian

Scientific classification
- Kingdom: Animalia
- Phylum: Chordata
- Class: Actinopterygii
- Cohort: Euteleostei
- Genus: †Barcarenichthys; Gayet, 1989
- Species: †B. joneti

Binomial name
- †Barcarenichthys joneti Gayet, 1989

Extinct genus of fishes

Barcarenichthys is an extinct genus of prehistoric marine ray-finned fish that lived during the Late Cretaceous. It contains a single species, B. joneti, from the late Cenomanian of Portugal.

Initially classified in the Salmoniformes, it is now considered an indeterminate basal euteleostean. However, more recent studies have continued to place it as a basal salmoniform.

== See also ==
- Prehistoric fish
- List of prehistoric bony fish
