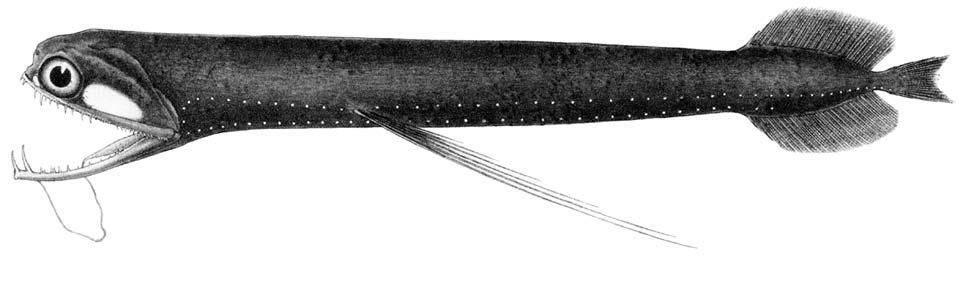
- Photostomias atrox
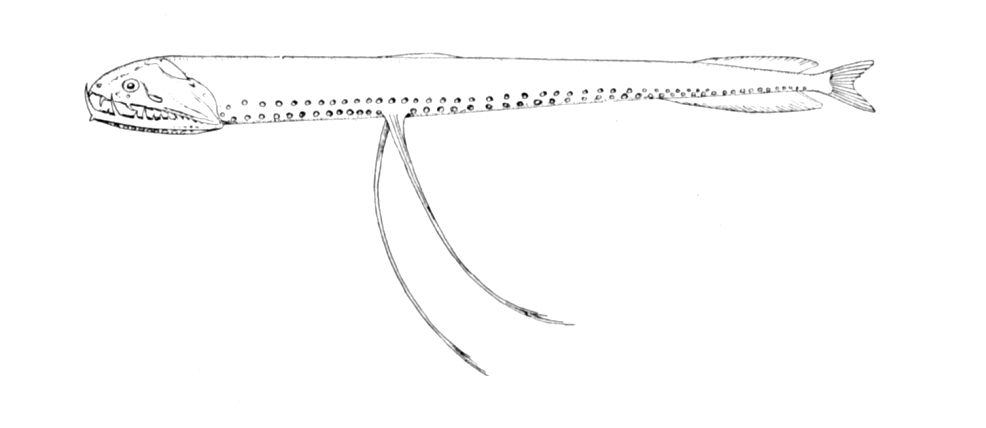
- Photostomias guernei

Scientific classification
- Kingdom: Animalia
- Phylum: Chordata
- Class: Actinopterygii
- Order: Stomiiformes
- Family: Stomiidae
- Subfamily: Malacosteinae
- Genus: Photostomias; Collett, 1889

Species
- See text

= Photostomias =

Genus of fishes

Photostomias is a genus of barbeled dragonfishes. They are found worldwide. The genus was previously known as ultimostomias.

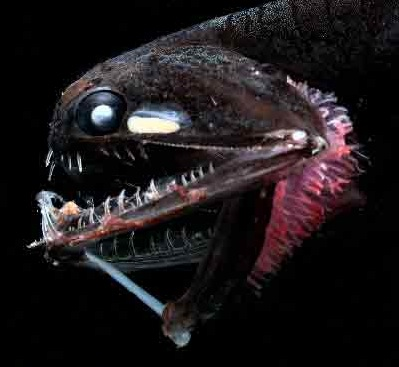
Photostomias goodyeari showing bio-luminescent organ

== Species ==
There are currently six recognized species in this genus:

- Photostomias atrox (Alcock, 1890)
- Photostomias goodyeari Kenaley & Hartel, 2005
- Photostomias guernei Collett, 1889
- Photostomias liemi Kenaley, 2009
- Photostomias lucingens Kenaley, 2009
- Photostomias tantillux Kenaley, 2009
