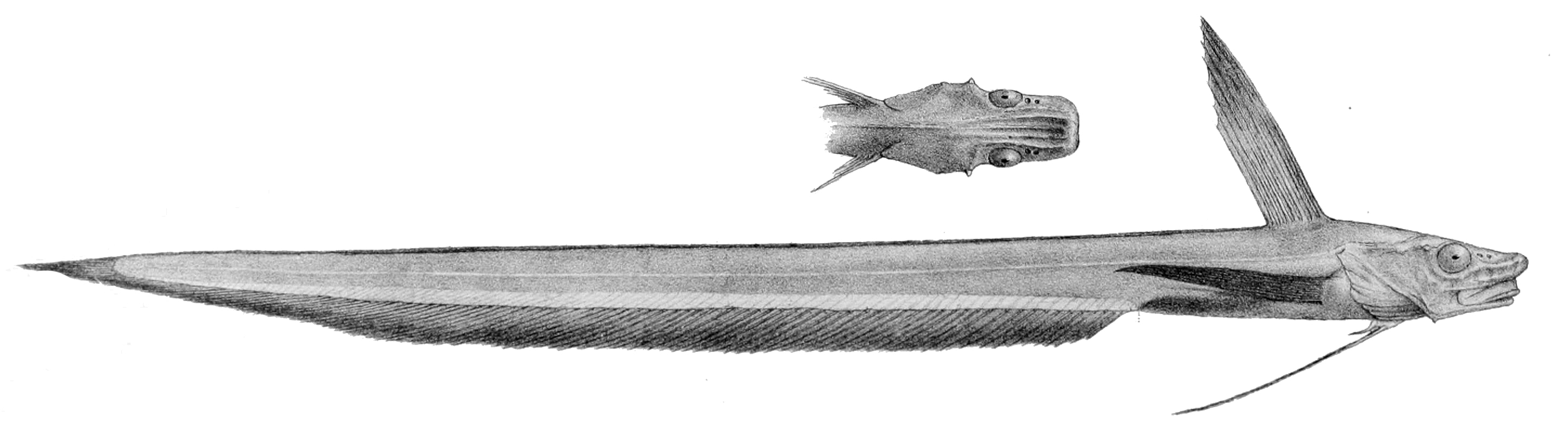
- Ateleopus japonicus

Scientific classification
- Kingdom: Animalia
- Phylum: Chordata
- Class: Actinopterygii
- Division: Teleostei
- Order: Ateleopodiformes
- Family: Ateleopodidae
- Genus: Ateleopus; Temminck & Schlegel, 1846

Type species
- Ateleopus japonicus Bleeker, 1854

Species
- Ateleopus japonicus Bleeker, 1854; Ateleopus edentatus Kaga, 2016

Synonyms
- Podateles Boulenger, 1902

= Ateleopus =

Ateleopus Temporal range: 15.9–0 Ma Middle Miocene to Present

Genus of fishes

Ateleopus is a genus of ray-finned fish in the jellynose family Ateleopodidae. It is the type genus of its family, and the order Ateleopodiformes. For some time, it was known as Podateles, because Ateleopus had been used to replace the frog genus name Atelopus, which was deemed to be a spelling error. This was mistaken, however, and the fish and frog genera reverted to their original names.

This genus occurs in the fossil record since the mid-Miocene.

== Species ==
There are currently 2 recognized species in this genus.

- Ateleopus edentatus Kaga, 2016
- Ateleopus japonicus Bleeker, 1854 (Pacific jellynose fish)

Several other species have been described, but these are synonyms.

- Ateleopus natalensis Regan, 1921 (Jelly-head fish)

Junior synonym of A. japonicus.

- Ateleopus purpureus Tanaka, 1915

Junior synonym of A. japonicus.

- Ateleopus tanabensis Tanaka, 1918

Junior synonym of A. japonicus.

- Ateleopus indicus Alcock, 1891

Junior synonym of Parateleopus indicus.

- Ateleopus schlegelii van der Hoeven, 1855

Junior synonym of A. japonicus.
