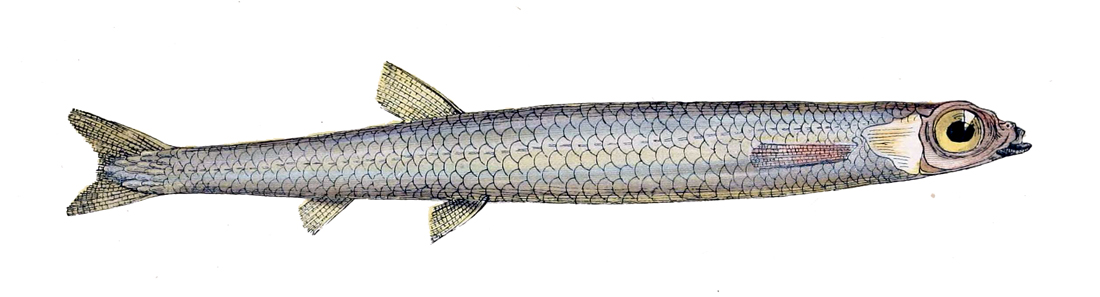
- Microstoma microstoma

Scientific classification
- Kingdom: Animalia
- Phylum: Chordata
- Class: Actinopterygii
- Order: Argentiniformes
- Family: Microstomatidae
- Genus: Microstoma; G. Cuvier, 1816

= Microstoma (fish) =

Genus of fishes

Microstoma is a genus of pencil smelt.

== Species ==
There are currently 2 species in this genus:

- Microstoma australis Gon & A. L. Stewart, 2014 (Slender smallmouth)
- Microstoma microstoma A. Risso, 1810 (Slender argentine)
