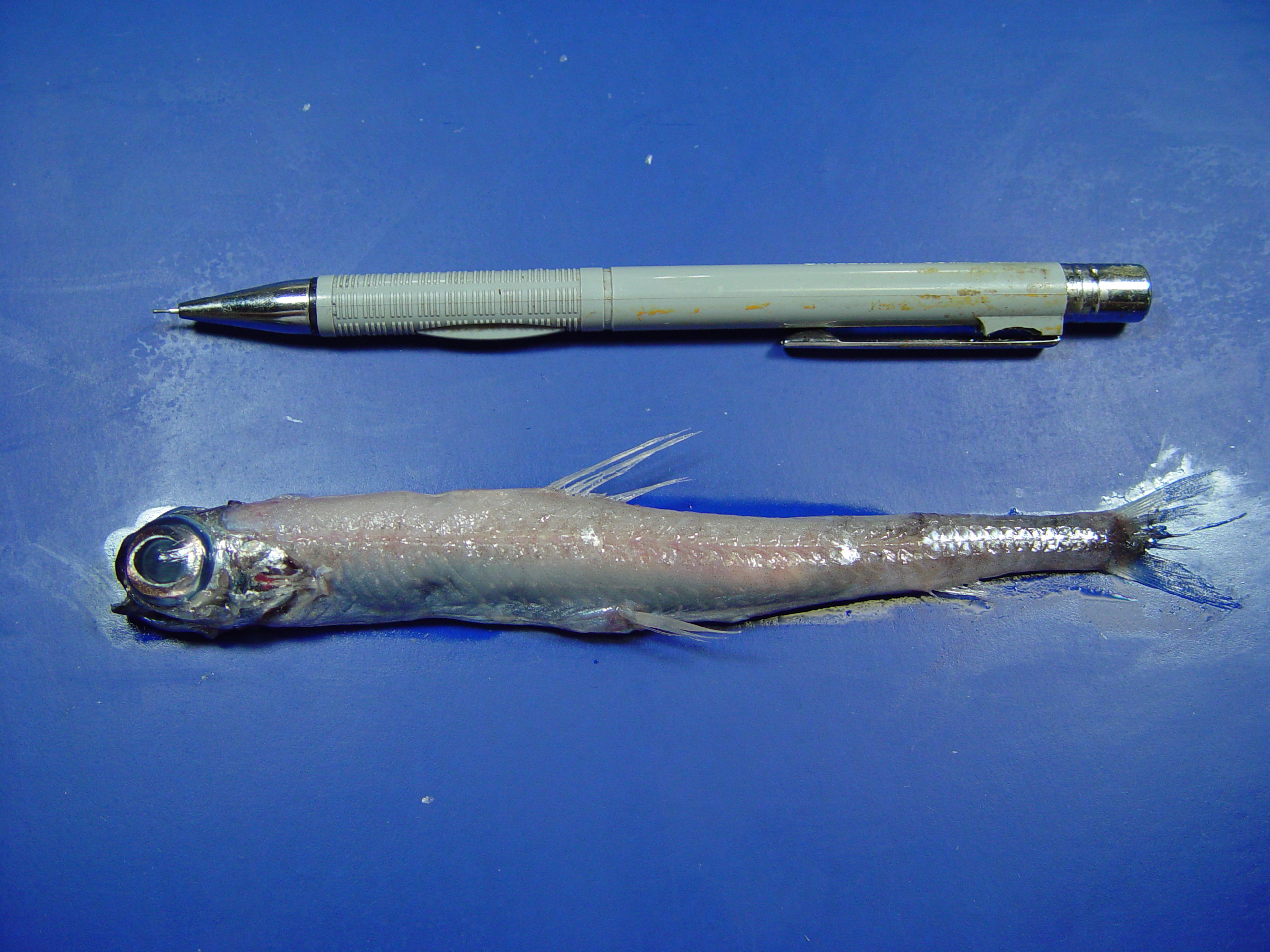
- Nansenia groenlandica

Scientific classification
- Domain: Eukaryota
- Kingdom: Animalia
- Phylum: Chordata
- Class: Actinopterygii
- Order: Argentiniformes
- Family: Microstomatidae
- Genus: Nansenia; D. S. Jordan & Evermann, 1896

= Nansenia (fish) =

Genus of fishes

Nansenia is a genus of pencil smelts.

== Species ==
There are currently 18 recognized species in this genus:

- Nansenia ahlstromi Kawaguchi & J. L. Butler, 1984
- Nansenia antarctica Kawaguchi & J. L. Butler, 1984
- Nansenia ardesiaca D. S. Jordan & W. F. Thompson, 1914 (Robust smallmouth)
- Nansenia atlantica Blache & Rossignol, 1962
- Nansenia boreacrassicauda J. Y. Poulsen, 2015 (Northern fat-tail pencil smelt)
- Nansenia candida Cohen, 1958 (Blue-throat argentine)
- Nansenia crassa Lavenberg, 1965 (Stout argentine)
- Nansenia groenlandica (J. C. H. Reinhardt, 1840) (Greenland argentine)
- Nansenia iberica Matallanas, 1985
- Nansenia indica Kobyliansky, 1992
- Nansenia longicauda Kawaguchi & J. L. Butler, 1984
- Nansenia macrolepis (Gilchrist, 1922)
- Nansenia megalopa Kawaguchi & J. L. Butler, 1984
- Nansenia oblita (Facciolà, 1887) (forgotten argentine, Mediterranean large-eyed argentine)
- Nansenia obscura Kobyliansky & S. G. Usachev, 1992
- Nansenia pelagica Kawaguchi & J. L. Butler, 1984
- Nansenia tenera Kawaguchi & J. L. Butler, 1984
- Nansenia tenuicauda Kawaguchi & J. L. Butler, 1984
