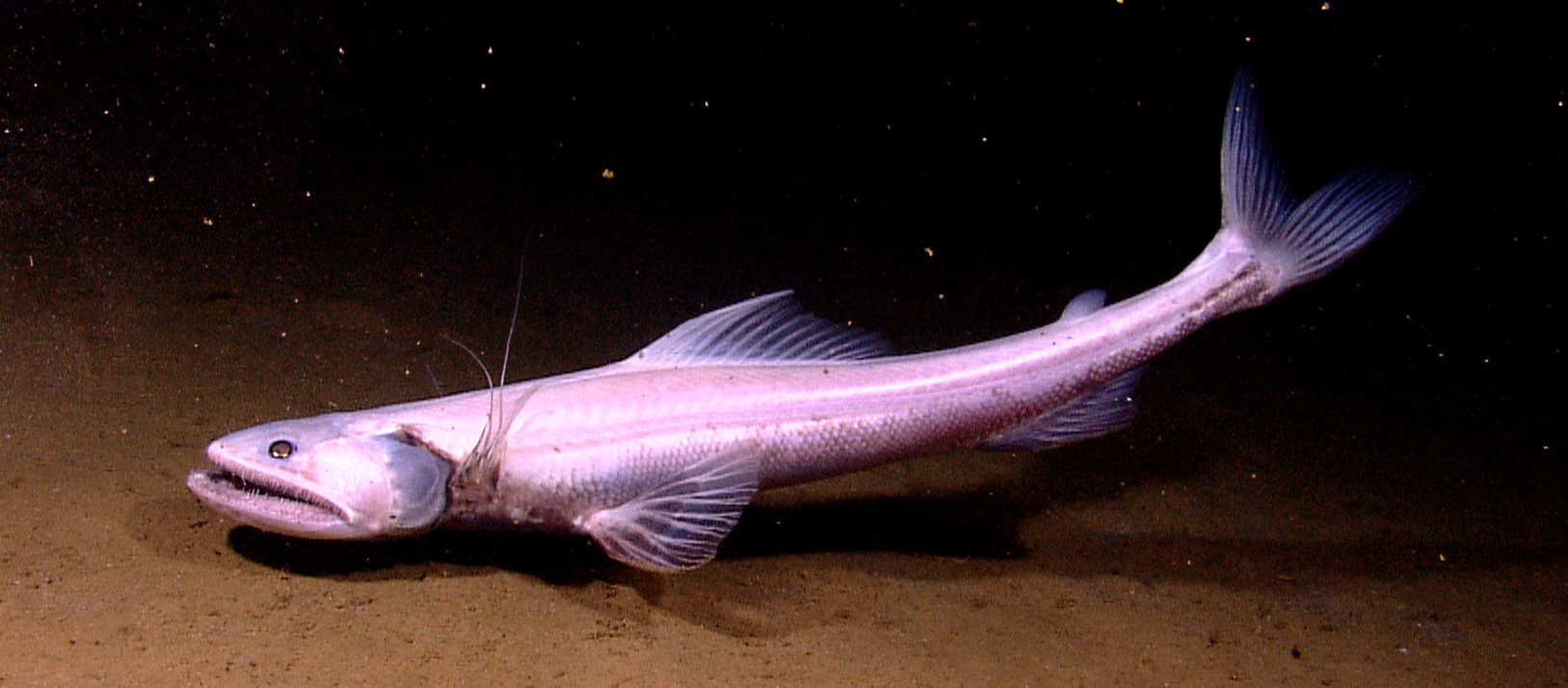
- The Neoteleostei include the Aulopiformes or lizardfish.

Scientific classification
- Kingdom: Animalia
- Phylum: Chordata
- Class: Actinopterygii
- Division: Teleostei
- Cohort: Euteleostei
- Clade: Neoteleostei; Rosen, 1973

Subdivisions
- See text

= Neoteleostei =

Neoteleostei Temporal range: Barremian–present

Clade of fishes

The Neoteleostei is a large clade of bony fish mostly consisting of marine clades. Only three lineages have freshwater species: Percopsiformes (Troutperches), which lives exclusively in freshwater, Gadiformes (cods), which is largely marine except from burbot that live in freshwater and a few populations of cod in brackish water, and the Percomorpha, which, in addition to several marine groups, also have many freshwater forms.

The remaining members of Neoteleostei are marine: The populous clade of the Acanthopterygii which consist of the Beryciformes, Holocentridae and the aforementioned Percomorpha (which include families such as the tuna, seahorses, gobies, cichlids, flatfish, wrasse, perches, anglerfish, pufferfish), the Ateleopodidae (jellynoses), the Lampriformes (oarfish, opah, ribbonfish), the Zeiformes (dories), the Polymixiiformes (beardfish), the Stylephorus, the Myctophiformes (lanternfish), and the Aulopiformes (lizardfish) which include some brackwater species. The marine order Stomiiformes was once included in the Neoteleostei as part of the superorder Stenopterygii, but have since been placed in Stomiati outside the Neoteleostei.

The swim bladder, when present, is physoclistous, a trait also shared with the non-neoteleostei orders Argentiniformes and Stomiiformes.

Neoteleostei have also lost the enzymes NOS2 and NOS3, the latter a trait they share with the rest of the Clupeocephala and possibly the Latimeria (NOS2 and NOS3 have also yet to be detected in Elopomorpha).

== Taxonomy ==
- Neoteleostei (175mya)
  - Ateleopodia
    Ateleopodidae (jellynoses)
  - Eurypterygia
    - Aulopa
      Aulopiformes (lizardfish)
    - Ctenosquamata
      - Scopelomorpha
        Myctophiformes (lanternfish)
      - Acanthomorpha
        - - Lampripterygii
            Lampriformes (oarfish, opah, ribbonfish)
          - Paracanthopterygii
            - Percopsiformes (troutperches)
            - - Zeiformes (dories)
              - - Stylephoriformes (tube-eyes, thread-fins)
                - Gadiformes (cods)
        - - Polymixiipterygii
            Polymixiiformes (beardfish)
          - Acanthopterygii
            - - Berycimorphaceae
                - Beryciformes (alfonsinos; whalefishes)
                - Trachichthyiformes (pinecone fishes & slimeheads)
            - - Holocentrimorphaceae
                Holocentriformes (squirrelfish; soldier fishes)
              - Percomorpha (tuna, seahorses, gobies, cichlids, flatfish, wrasse, perches, anglerfish, pufferfish, etc)

The following fossil basal neoteleost families are also known:

- Family †Cheirothricidae Woodward, 1901 (possibly in the Aulopiformes)
- ?Family †Protostomiatidae Arambourg, 1955
- ?Family †Thaumaturidae Voigt, 1934
- ?Family †Tomognathidae Jordan, 1923
