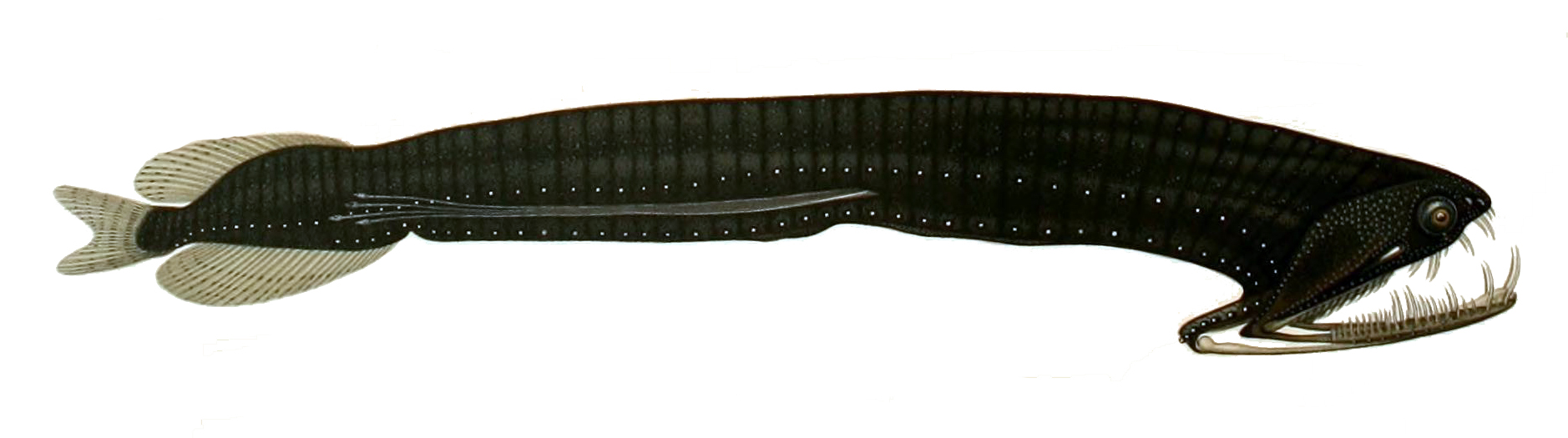

Conservation status
- Least Concern (IUCN 3.1)

Scientific classification
- Kingdom: Animalia
- Phylum: Chordata
- Class: Actinopterygii
- Order: Stomiiformes
- Family: Stomiidae
- Genus: Photostomias
- Species: P. guernei

Binomial name
- Photostomias guernei Collett, 1889

= Photostomias guernei =

Species of fish

Photostomias guernei is a species of barbeled dragonfish in the genus Photostomias. P. guernei is a scaleless, ray-finned fish found in deep oceans. The species has been documented in the Atlantic and Pacific oceans, and fully-grown members of the species can reach a maximum length of ~16 centimeters. It is defined by its deep-sea lifestyle and predatory existence. This fish possesses bioluminescent organs used to draw in prey and attract mates, exhibiting strong sexual dimorphism in morphology.

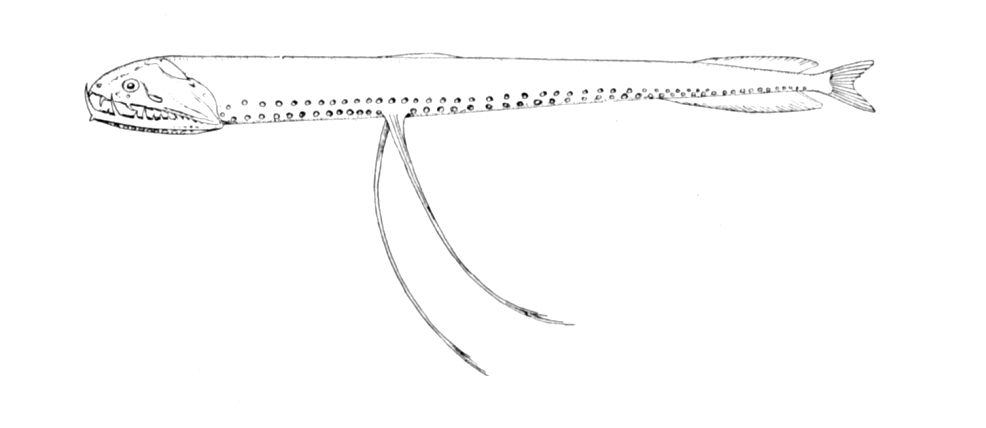
Photostomias guernei in adult stage.

== Evolution ==
Photostomias is amongst the most derived Stomiids. It derived from its most recent common ancestor approximately 11.2 million years ago, between the Middle to Late Eocene epoch. As for most fish represented by the Stomiidae family, extreme habitat for P. guernei leaves it poorly represented in the fossil record. It is suggested to be nested within a red light-sensitive clade of dragonfishes with sister group Eustomias.

Stomiidae cladogram

=== Taxonomy and etymology ===
The name of the genera Photostomias is derived from Greek photos (light) and stoma (mouth). The eponymy of guernei follows French zoologist and geographer Jules Germain Maloteau de Guerne.

== Distribution ==
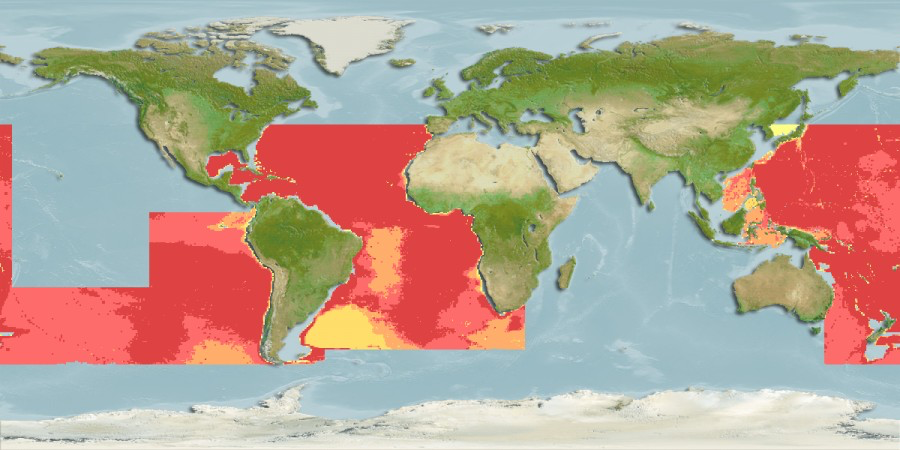
Global distribution of Photostomias guernei.

Photostomias guernei are distributed worldwide. P. guernei has been reported in the Atlantic and Pacific oceans in temperate and subtropical waters. Following the life history of P. guernei, distribution is concentrated in the western and eastern Atlantic and the southeast Pacific. P. guernei is estimated to be the most abundant Stomiid of the eastern Gulf of Mexico.

=== Habitat ===
Photostomias guernei is a marine fish that occupies the bathypelagic zone, keeping within 1138 and 3100 meters of depth. It is classified as maintaining an asynchronous pattern of diel vertical migration, occupying different ranges within the water column at different times of the day. During the daytime, P. guernei occupies the lower regions of the mesopelagic zone. Caught specimens reveal that larger members of the P. guernei species occupy greater depths during the daytime. At night, trends show P. guernei residing in various locations, notably within clusters in the epipelagic and the mesopelagic.

== Anatomy ==
=== Skin ===
Photostomias guernei is described as being scaleless and possessing an elongated body plan. Its skin coloration can vary between dark brown and black by melanophores. Regarding skin pigmentation, P. guernei possesses eight pairs of melanophores per dorsal myomere as adults.

=== Fins ===
Caught Photostomias guernei specimens have revealed varying quantities in fin rays. Dorsal fins vary between 22 and 28 rays, while anal fins vary between 25 and 32 rays. There are no pectoral fins present in P. guernei. There are six pelvic fin rays uniformly present in P. guernei .

=== Digestion ===
The stomachs of Photostomias guernei are distensible, expanding to sizes to accommodate their large prey sizes. After food is digested, the stomach returns to its neutral size.

=== Skull ===
Within the Stomiidae family, Photostomias is one of two genera without a mental barbel. In addition, there are no true gill rakers present in adult P. guernei. The average otolith sizes of caught specimens range from 0.50 to 0.95 mm in length. There is one infraorbital bone present in P. guernei skulls.

Photostomias guernei possesses sharp, enlarged teeth that stick out of its mouth. P. guernei can be distinguished from other dragonfishes by the presence of two pairs of basibranchial tooth patches. In addition, P. guernei possesses a hinge within the upper-jaw system that allows it to rotate forwards, allowing its mouth to exceed the size of its head. Its mouth gape can reach up to 100^{o}. The jaw is exceedingly longer than the neuro-cranium, exhibiting lengths greater than 30% the standard lengths of fish jaws. Skin is notably absent between the mandibular rami. This allows jaws to close at a greater velocity.

There is a flexible connection found between the occipital condyle and the first vertebra found in Photostomias guernei. This connection is folded inwards in the resting position, resting below the basioccipital and the ventral sheath of the notochord embodies the occipital condyle in its entirety. When P. guernei opens its mouth, the ventral sheath reveals the notochord and the head becomes elevated. In addition, the pectoral girdle is separated from the skull. These features allow P. guernei to demonstrate greater flexibility, allowing it to pull its head back further than it is expected in fishes of other taxa.

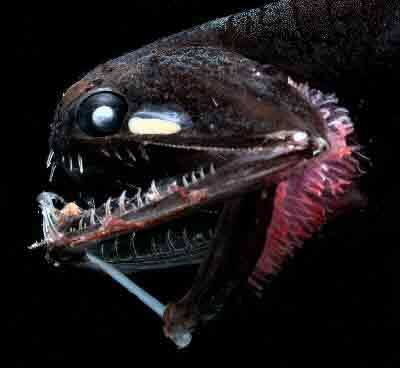
Photostomias guernei

=== Sensory organs ===
Photostomias guernei has heightened ocular capabilities in response to its dark environments. The lateral line system is uninterrupted. As a result of light properties in deep waters, P. guernei possesses retinas that are receptive to the narrow blue spectrum. It has eyes more sensitive to blue light with a greater quantity of rhodopsin pigment present. P. guernei retinas contain rhodopsin tuned to 483 nm. Furthermore, P. guernei has a small suborbital photophore that is used to reduce shock from events of sudden light.

=== Sexual dimorphism ===
Photostomias guernei is denoted as a fish that exhibits sexual dimorphism. Males and females exhibit size differences in postorbital (PO) photophore size, a bioluminescent organ found in many deep-sea dragonfishes that emits maxima greater than 525 nm. P. guernei males have a larger PO photophore size than females. Males have an accessory orbital (AO) photophore that is exposed, while females have a thin membrane covering their AO photophore. Males are smaller in size than females. The maximum caught male/unsexed specimen is 17 cm in length.

=== Larval stage ===
The average Photostomias guernei larvae can range between 20.0 and 27.5 mm in length. P. guernei larvae have small, narrow eyes and elongated pelvic fins. The eight pairs of melanophores per dorsal myomere is a diagnostic characteristic to distinguish P. guernei larvae from other genera within the Stomiidae family. Epaxial and hypaxial myoseptum melanophores are absent. Pectoral fins are present in the larval stage of P. guernei. These fins are lost as the fish transitions into adulthood. In addition, the gut structure of P. guernei larvae trails freely. It appears as a thin structure that protrudes the ventral side of the body. This organ is also lost in its adult form. The presence of gill rakers in larvae is unknown.

== Behavior and ecology ==
=== Feeding strategies ===
Photostomias guernei is a hunting predator that ambushes prey with its improved sight. P. guernei primarily utilizes visual cues to find prey. Once suitable prey is within reaching distance, the rotating jaw will extend forwards to trap the prey. The gaping mouth and the distensible stomach of P. guernei allows it to consume large prey. The basibranchial teeth near the gill arches assist in keeping prey from escaping.

=== Reproduction ===
Finding mates in total darkness makes it difficult for deep-sea organisms to acquire mates. A study reveals that reproductive encounters in this environment are rare, with the average distance between P. guernei individuals being 25 m. In P. guernei, visual signaling in the form of bioluminescence is used to attract potential mates. Furthermore, since the AO photophore is covered by skin in females, the exposed AO photophore in males suggests that males rely more on visual cues to find suitable mates. P. guernei males are more equipped to find mates than females are. This suggests some level of sexual selection is present.

Visual cues work in tandem with olfactory cues. Sexual dimorphism is also present in olfactory organs amongst Photostomias guernei individuals. Males have a larger olfactory organ than females, suggesting that males are more receptive to finding chemical cues released by females. The exact mechanisms underlying search behavior is unknown; however, it is possible that males use bioluminescence to initially attract females and females then release olfactory cues to close the distance between the two.

In terms of sexual dimorphism, the average sizes between Photostomias guernei sexes is different. Females are larger than males. Studies suggest that males have no preference in female size and will mate with any female that they can exchange signals with.

Photostomias guernei present a non-guarding reproductive guild. There is no level of parental care present for larvae.

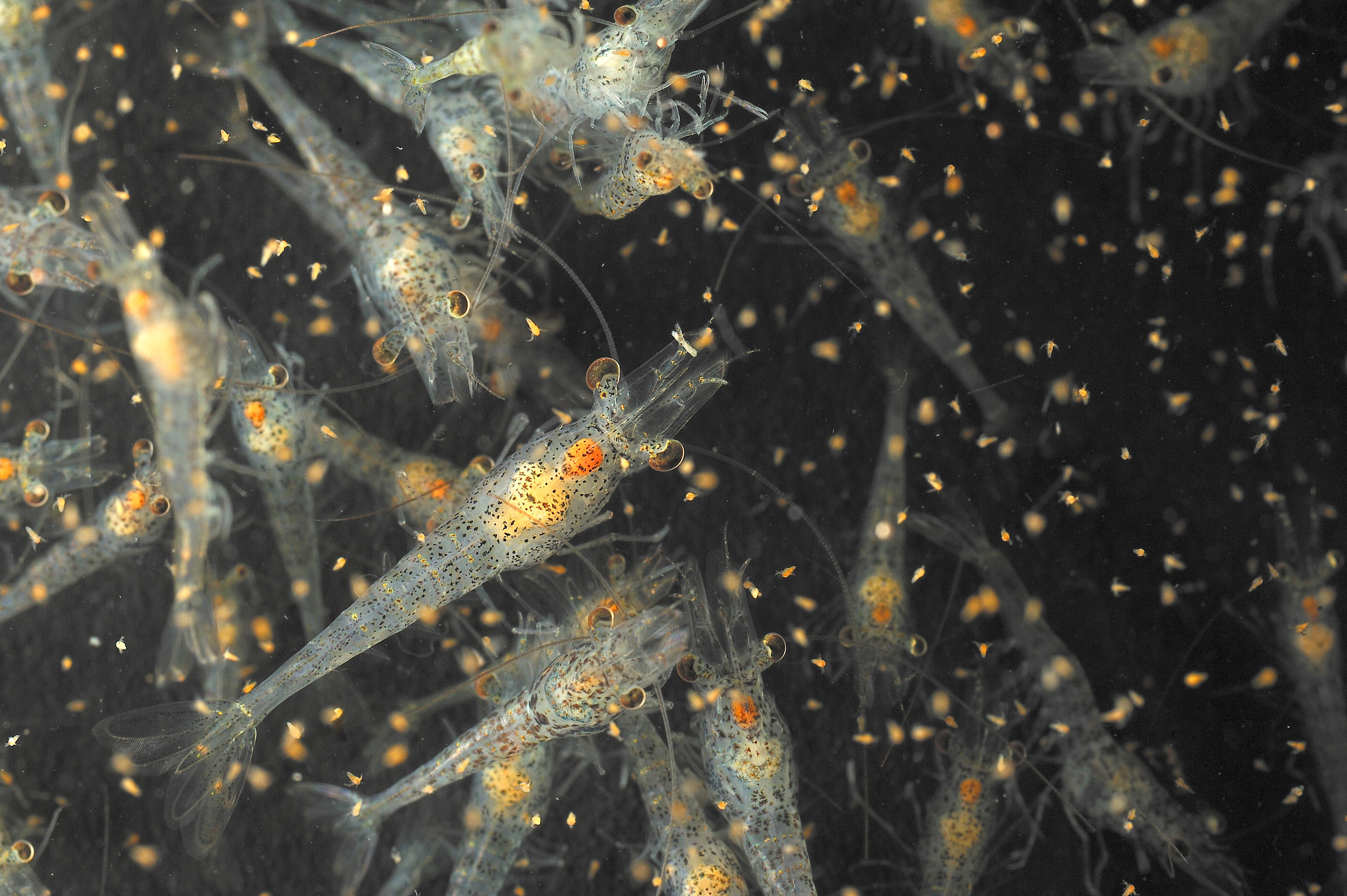
Sample diet for Photostomias guernei.

=== Diet ===
Photostomias guernei primarily eat crustaceans, which are typically found in greater numbers in deep-sea habitats. Dissections typically find penaeidean shrimp or prawn within the stomach contents of P. guernei.

=== Trophic level ===
The estimated trophic level of Photostomias guernei is approximately 3.5. Its predatory nature makes it a secondary or tertiary consumer in the trophic level pyramid. It consumes other organisms of a trophic level of at least 2.8. No specific predators are known, but larger predatory fish such as deep-sea sharks are likely to predate on P. guernei due to food scarcity in this hostile environment.

== Conservation ==
The IUCN designation for Photostomias guernei is Least Concern (LC). The extreme habitat of this fish makes it difficult for researchers to perform surveys to assess population sizes and demography. This fish makes no contact with humans in its natural environment. There is no human use for P. guernei and it is of no harm to humans.
