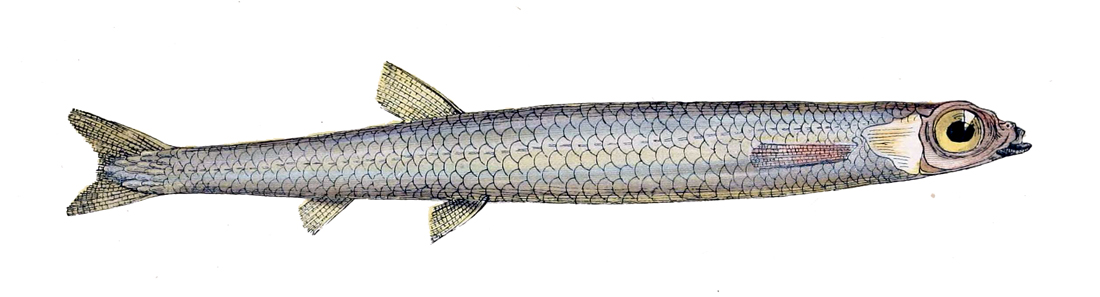
- Slender argentine, Microstoma microstoma

Scientific classification
- Domain: Eukaryota
- Kingdom: Animalia
- Phylum: Chordata
- Class: Actinopterygii
- Order: Argentiniformes
- Suborder: Argentinoidei
- Family: Microstomatidae

Genera
- Microstoma; Nansenia; Xenophthalmichthys

= Microstomatidae =

Family of fishes

The Microstomatidae (pencil smelts) are a family of marine smelts native to the Atlantic, Indian, and Pacific Oceans. Their bodies are small and slender, with large eyes and a small mouth. The dorsal fin is located behind the midpoint of their body, with pectoral fins on sides of their body, and the lateral line extends over the caudal fin. These fins lack spines. They are inhabitants of the mesopelagic to bathypelagic zone, where they feed on zooplankton.
