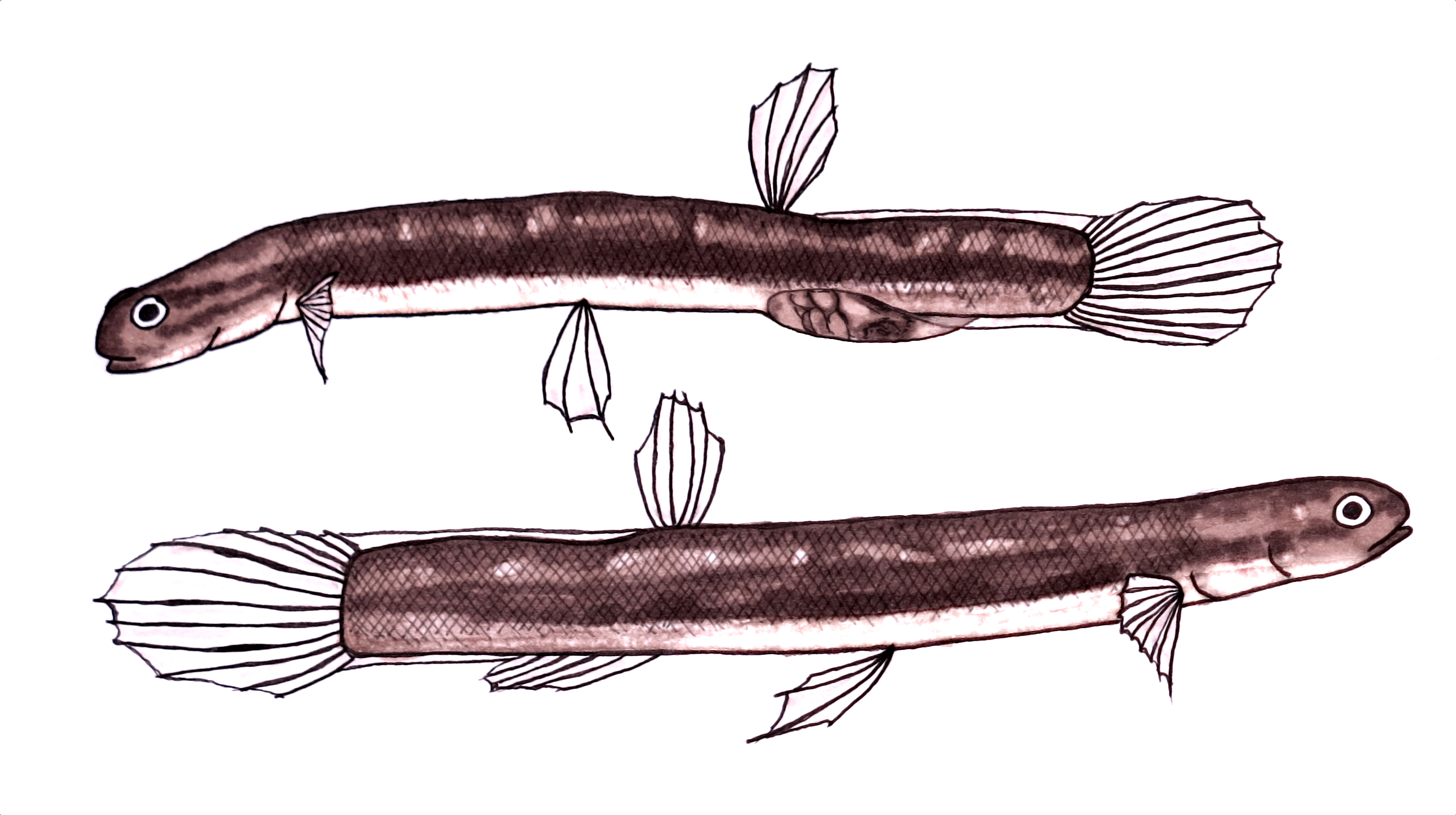
- Drawings of male (top) and female (bottom) specimens of Lepidogalaxias

Conservation status
- Endangered (IUCN 3.1)

Scientific classification
- Kingdom: Animalia
- Phylum: Chordata
- Class: Actinopterygii
- Division: Teleostei
- Cohort: Euteleostei
- Superorder: Lepidogalaxii
- Order: Lepidogalaxiiformes
- Family: Lepidogalaxiidae; Rosen, 1974
- Genus: Lepidogalaxias; Mees, 1961
- Species: L. salamandroides

Binomial name
- Lepidogalaxias salamandroides Mees, 1961
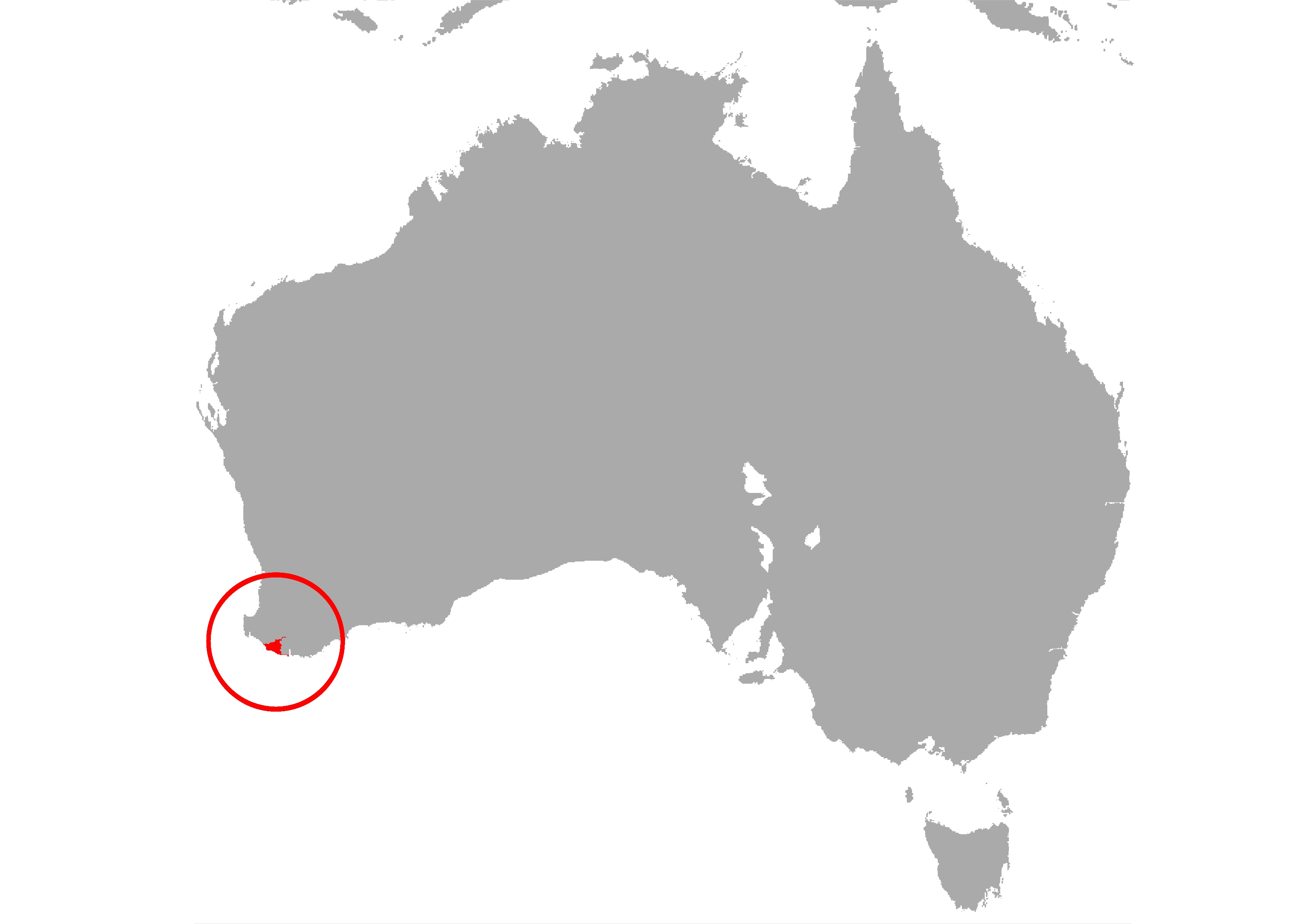

= Lepidogalaxias =

Lepidogalaxias salamandroides

Species of fish

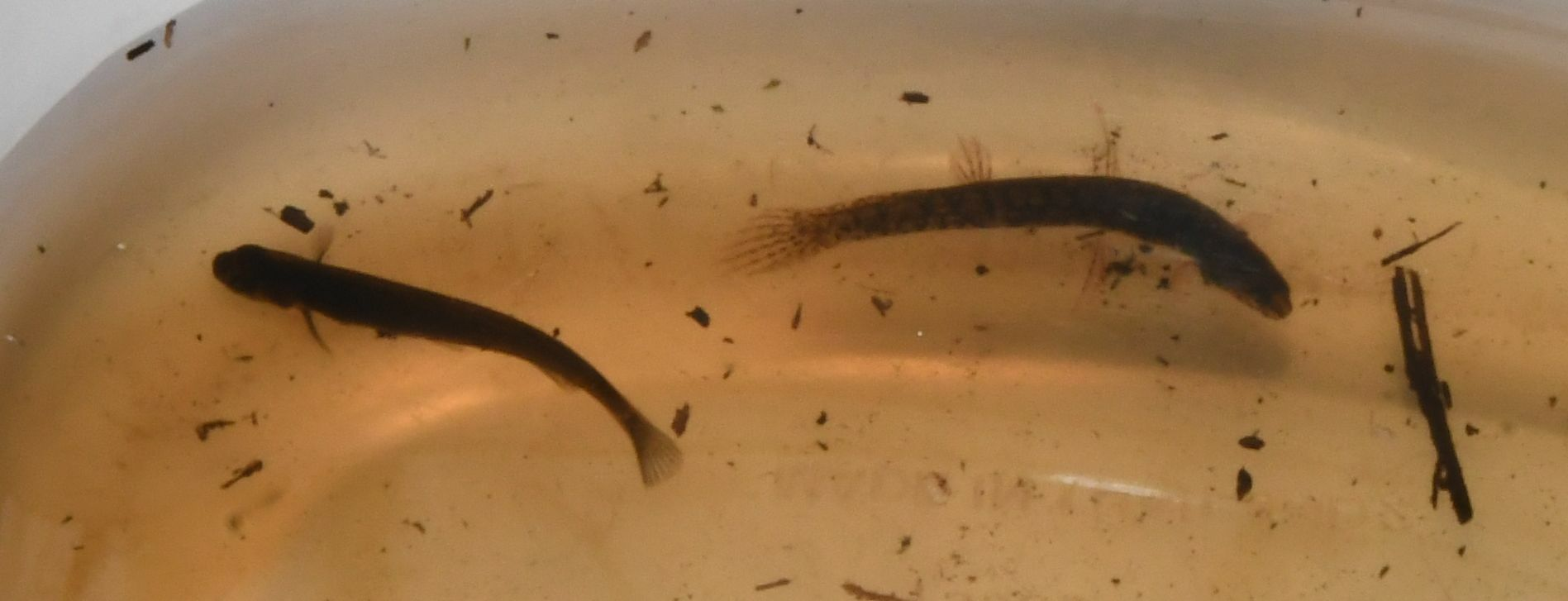
Salamanderfish observed in habitat, 2023

Lepidogalaxias salamandroides is a species of small freshwater fish of Western Australia. Common names for this fish include salamanderfish and Shannon mudminnow. Although it is not a lungfish, it resembles lungfish in several respects, including its ability to survive dry seasons by burrowing into the sand. It is on the IUCN Red List as Endangered.

The salamanderfish belongs to Euteleostei, a clade of ray-finned fish. However, it is not considered to be closely related to other Euteleostei species. As such, it is placed in the monotypic superorder Lepidogalaxii.

== Morphology ==
Lepidogalaxias salamandroides is small with females measuring up to 7 cm in length. This species has a slender, elongate and cylindrical body. The colour is brownish-green on the upper parts, silver-speckled and blotched on the sides, very pale below, and the fin membranes are transparent. The fish's eyes are fixed, lack eye muscles, and are covered by a secondary eyelid. To compensate, the fish is able to move its neck in any direction.

== Biology ==
The salamanderfish spawn in winter when water levels are highest. Males have a uniquely modified anal fin used for internal fertilization. When not in use, the fin is folded strongly to the left or right and sheathed with a series of greatly enlarged scales. The females produce 100–400 eggs with a diameter of 1.1–1.3mm, which hatch into bottom-feeder larvae 5.5mm long. Larvae and juveniles grow rapidly to gain fat stores to survive the summer drought period. Individuals can reach up to 5 years of age.

The salamanderfish is carnivorous, mainly feeding on aquatic insect larvae. When their habitat dries, up they switch to atmospheric gas exchange via cutaneous respiration. The swim bladder, on the other hand, is not suitable for aerial respiration.

== Range and habitat ==
It has a limited distribution in acidic pools of water in heathland peat flats of southwest Australia, between the Blackwood and Kent Rivers. This range is across a distance of 180 kilometres, in an area of Northcliffe, they are common in this region. Its habitat is semi-permanent water, small pools and streams that may be high in tannins and acidity (pH 3.0–6.5). They experience a range of water temperatures, daily changes of 16 to 32 degrees Celsius, in pools no deeper than 0.1 metres. The species rests on the bottom of the water using elongated pelvic and rounded caudal fins. These small and shallow pools may contain a population of around 150 individuals, are generally no larger than 600 square metres, and evaporate in the dry seasons. It is also unusual for its ability to survive desiccation by burrowing into sand, a process of aestivation, when the pools it lives in periodically evaporate.

== Taxonomy ==
The species was first described in 1961 by Gerlof Mees. Mees identified the species as belonging to the family Galaxiidae, but its relationship to those species was in doubt. In 1991, Lepidogalaxias salamandroides was placed among the order Osmeriformes in the monotypic genus Lepidogalaxias and family Lepidogalaxiidae. Later analyses of molecular data uncovered that Lepidogalaxias is an old and isolated lineage and the sister group to all other Euteleostei species. As a result, Lepidogalaxias is placed as the sole member of the superorder Lepidogalaxii. The species is contained in the class Actinopterygii, ray-finned fish, and is sometimes placed in the order Salmoniformes.

It is sometimes named as the mud minnow, long-finned Galaxias, scaled galaxias, or dwarf pencilfish, however mud minnow usually refers to Galaxiella munda. A further list of names refer to L. salamandroides as salamanderfish of Western Australia, West Australian salamanderfish, salamander fish, salamanderfish, and Shannon mudminnow.
