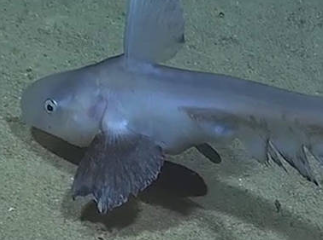
- Unknown species of Jellynose fish on Whiting Seamount
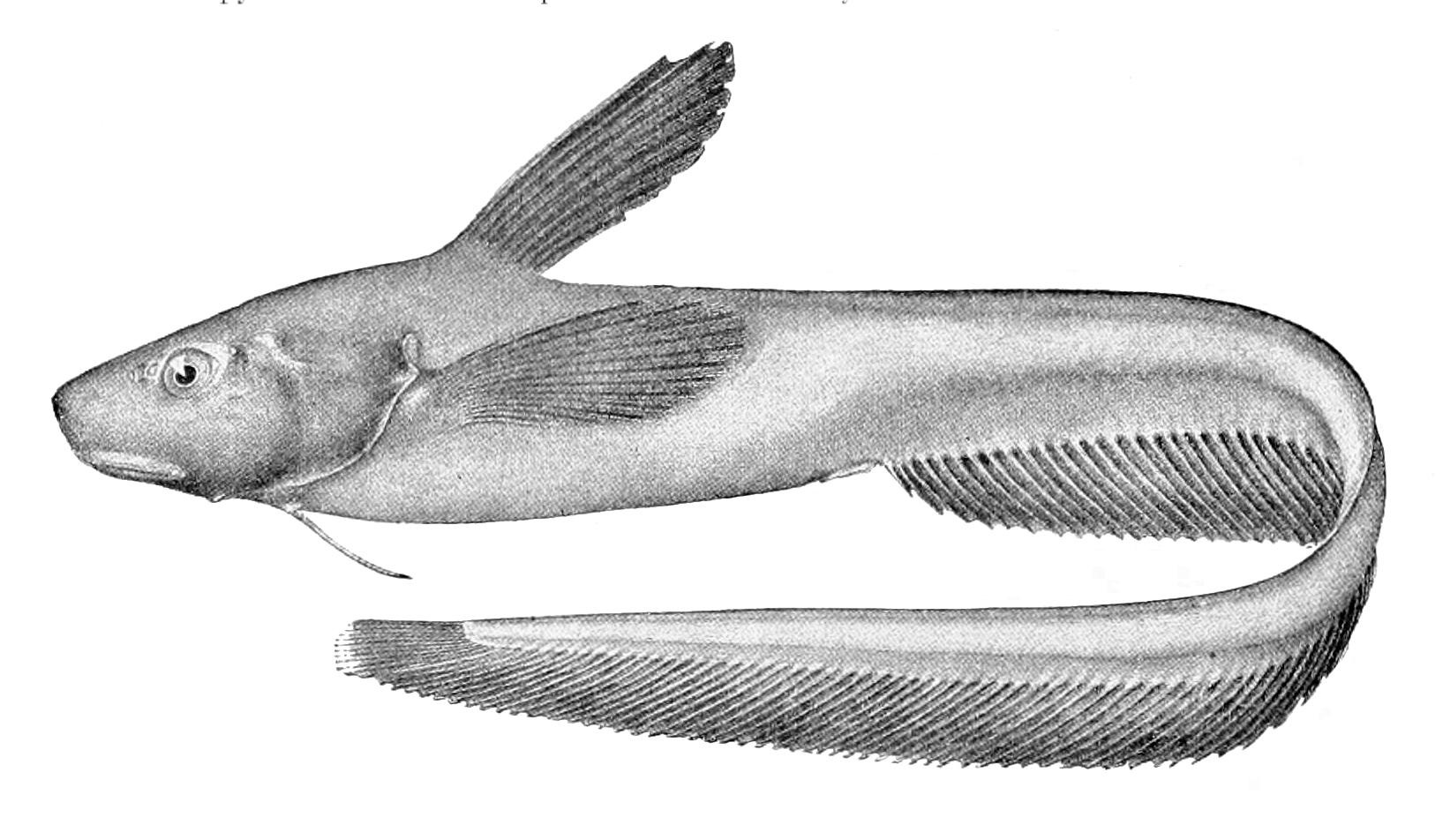
- Deep-water ateleopid fish (Ijimaia plicatellus)

Scientific classification
- Kingdom: Animalia
- Phylum: Chordata
- Class: Actinopterygii
- Clade: Neoteleostei
- Order: Ateleopodiformes
- Family: Ateleopodidae; Bonaparte, 1850

Type species
- Ateleopus japonicus Bleeker, 1853

Genera
- Ateleopus; Guentherus; Ijimaia; Parateleopus

= Jellynose fish =

Jellynose fishes

Order of fishes

The jellynose fishes or tadpole fishes are the small order Ateleopodiformes. This group of ray-finned fish is monotypic, containing a single family Ateleopodidae. It has about a dozen species in four genera, but these enigmatic fishes are in need of taxonomic revision.

The scientific name means "Ateleopus-shaped", from Ateleopus (the type genus) + the standard fish order suffix "-formes". It ultimately derives from Ancient Greek atelēs (ἀτελής, "imperfect") + pous (πούς, "foot") + Latin forma ("external form"), the Greek part in reference to the reduced pectoral and ventral fins of the jellynoses.

== Description and ecology ==
Jellynoses are deep-water, bottom-dwelling, marine fishes. They are known from the Caribbean Sea, eastern Atlantic, the western and central Indopacific, and the Pacific coast of Central America. Primarily known from mesopelagic waters, an unidentified species of Ateleopus was observed in the Java and Mariana Trenches in the southwest Pacific at hadal depths up to 6,737 metres (22,103 ft), extending the depth range of the family by 5,500 metres (18,000 ft).

Jellynose skeletons are largely cartilage (hence 'jellynose'), although they are true teleosts and not closely related to Chondrichthyes. The heads are large, with a bulbous nose, and the (usually) elongated body tapers towards the tail. Their caudal fins are very small, and except for Guentherus, it is merged with the long anal fin (which has 70 fin rays or more). The pelvic fins of juveniles have up to 10 rays, but in adults this is reduced to a single elongated ray at the throat.

Again, Guentherus is an exception, retaining several fins as adults and having ventral fins that are located behind (not below) the pectoral fins. dorsal fins tend to be high, with a rather short base (9–13 rays, but in some as few as three); they are placed just behind the head. They have seven branchiostegal rays. The species have a range of sizes, the longest reaching 2 m (6.6 ft). A swim bladder is absent, and some species also lack scales.

Most of the species are poorly known, but the highfin tadpole fish (Guentherus altivelis) is of potential interest for commercial fishing.

== Systematics ==
Together with their relatives, the Stomiiformes, the jellynoses are often placed in the teleost superorder Stenopterygii. Whether it is indeed justified to accept such a small group is doubtful; it may well be that the closest living relatives of the "Stenopterygii" are found among the superorder Protacanthopterygii, and that the former would need to be merged in the latter. In some classifications, the "Stenopterygii" are kept separate but included with the Protacanthopterygii and the monotypic superorder Cyclosquamata in an unranked clade called Euteleostei. That would probably require splitting two additional monotypic superorders out of the Protacanthopterygii, and is probably not ideal due to the profusion of very small taxa it would create. In fact, in some treatments, the jellynose fishes are even placed in yet another monotypic superorder, the Ateleopodomorpha.

The Ateleopodidae have also been placed in the Lampriformes or Myctophiformes, which otherwise constitute additional superorders. The relationships of these to the taxa mentioned before is still not well resolved at all, and regardless whether one calls them Protacanthopterygii sensu lato or Euteleostei, the phylogeny of this group of moderately advanced Teleostei is in need of further study.
