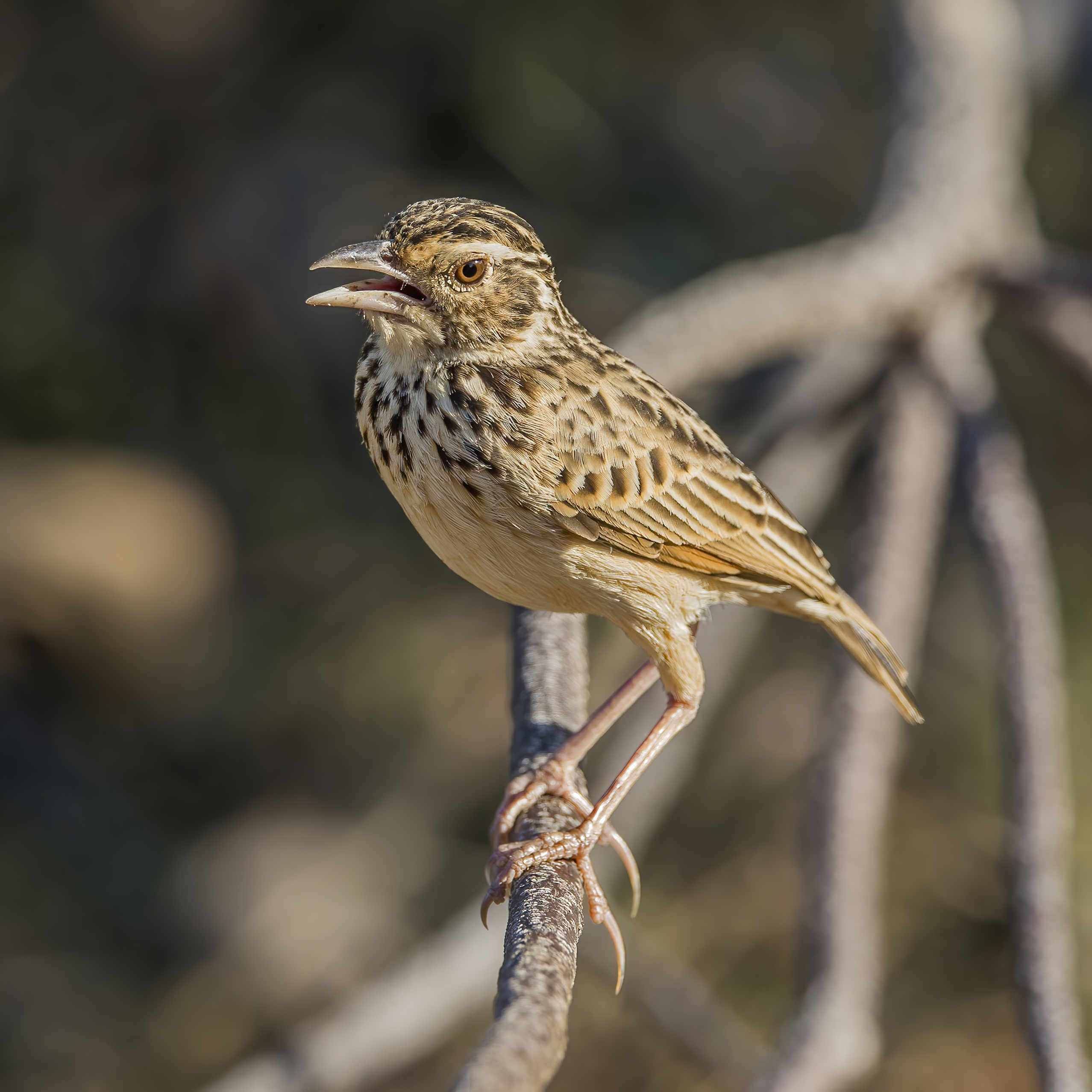
- in Sri Lanka

Conservation status
- Least Concern (IUCN 3.1)

Scientific classification
- Kingdom: Animalia
- Phylum: Chordata
- Class: Aves
- Order: Passeriformes
- Family: Alaudidae
- Genus: Plocealauda
- Species: P. affinis

Binomial name
- Plocealauda affinis (Blyth, 1845)
- Range in bright green

Synonyms
- Mirafra assamica affinis

Audio
- Song from perch. Bandipur, India

= Jerdon's bush lark =

Species of bird

Jerdon's bush lark (Plocealauda affinis) or Jerdon's lark is a species of lark in the family Alaudidae found in south Asia. This was formerly placed in the genus Mirafra and considered as a subspecies of Mirafra assamica and termed as the Madras bushlark. Two other species in the complex include Mirafra marionae and Mirafra microptera. Jerdon's bush lark is typically very pale on the underside

== Taxonomy and systematics ==
The common name commemorates the surgeon-naturalist Thomas C. Jerdon.

Formerly, Jerdon's bush lark was considered to be a subspecies of the Bengal bush lark (as M. assamica affinis) until studies of differences in call and distribution led to it being treated as a separate species. However, not all authorities recognize this species split.

The species is monotypic: no subspecies are recognised. Jerdon's bush lark was formerly placed in the genus Mirafra but was one of five species moved to the newly erected genus Plocealauda based on evidence from a large molecular genetic study published in 2023.

== Description ==
Jerdon's bush lark has arrowhead-like spots pointing upwards on the breast. It is very similar to the Indian bush lark (M. erythroptera) but has buffy lores, less white behind ear coverts, darker center to wing coverts and central tail feathers. Dark centers of primary coverts are prominent, and wing panels are duller and rufous. In the southern Western Ghats, the race ceylonensis is darker and more rufous on the underside and has a longer bill. Jerdon's bush lark has paler, greyish-brown underparts.

The song of the Jerdon's bush lark is a dry rattle given from its perch.

== Distribution and habitat ==
Jerdon's bush lark has a large range in south-east India and Sri Lanka, with an estimated global extent of occurrence of 100,000-1,000,000 square kilometers.

It has proven adaptable to a variety of open habitats up to a maximum elevation of 1500 m. Some of these are forest perimeters, rocky scrubland, scrubby hill meadows and clearings in open-type forests, shrub-edged unused croplands, and thickets of bamboo.

== Behaviour and ecology ==
Its song-flight is similar to that of the Indian bush lark, However, unlike the aforementioned species, Jerdon's bush lark often perches on trees and wires.

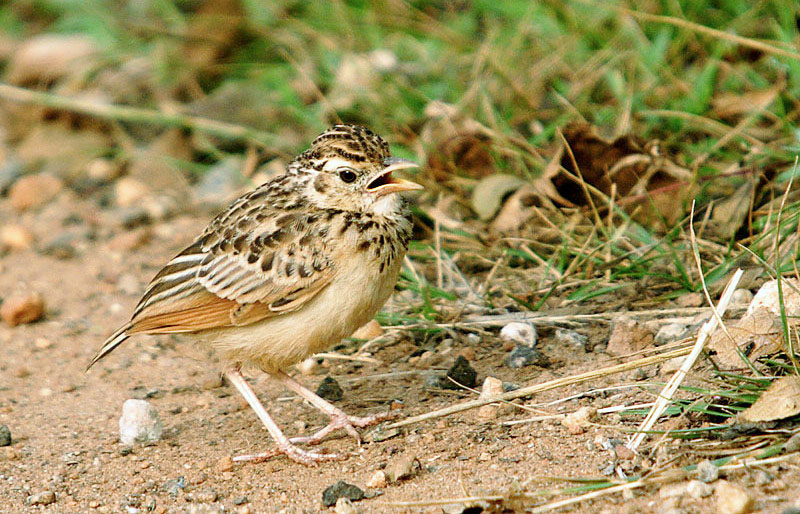
A juvenile near Bangalore, India

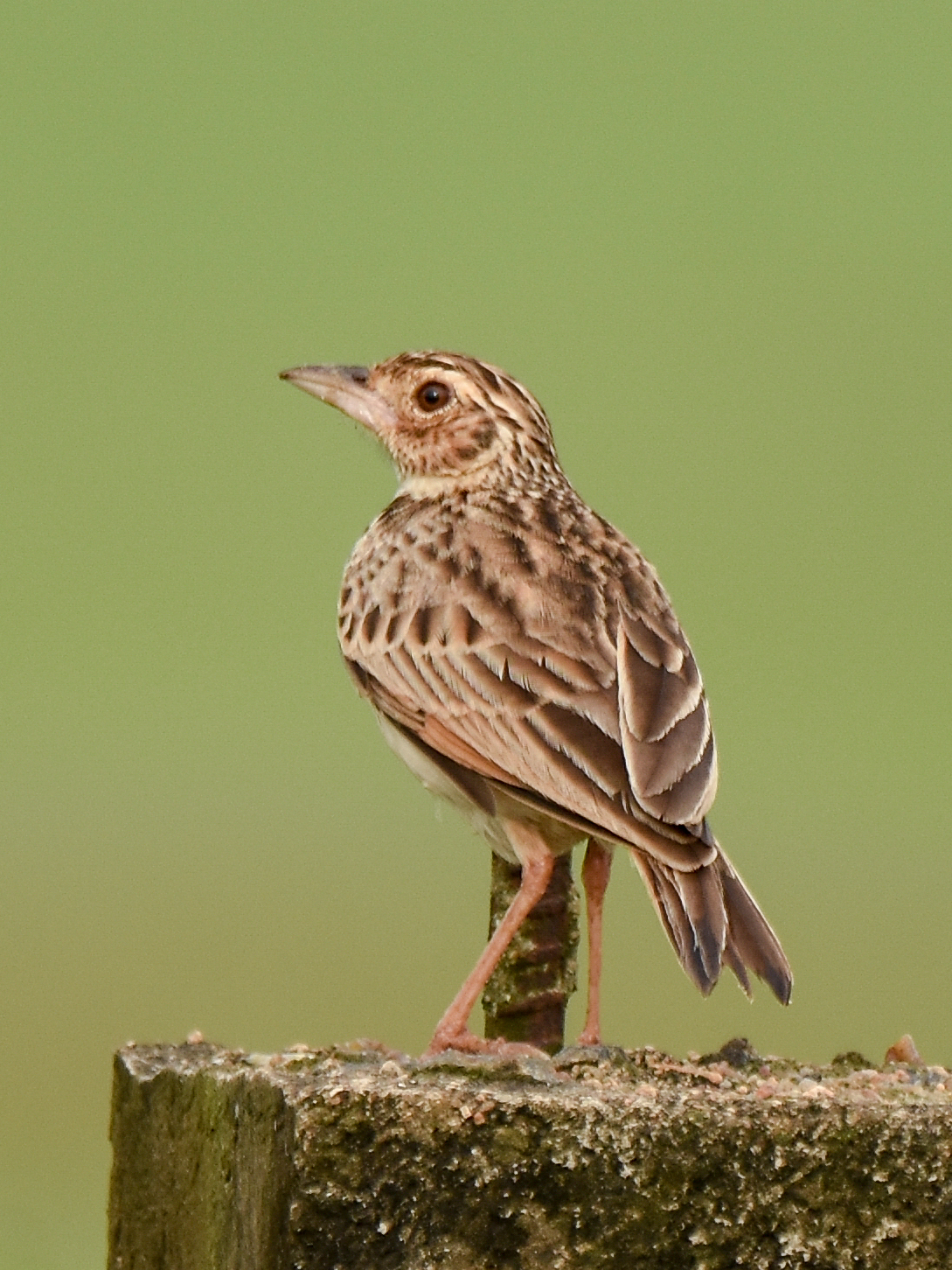
Adult bird near Chennai, India
