= Hymenocephalus =

Hymenocephalus is the scientific name of two genera of organisms and may refer to:

- Hymenocephalus (fish), a genus of fishes in the family Macrouridae
- Hymenocephalus (plant), a genus of plants in the family Asteraceae
