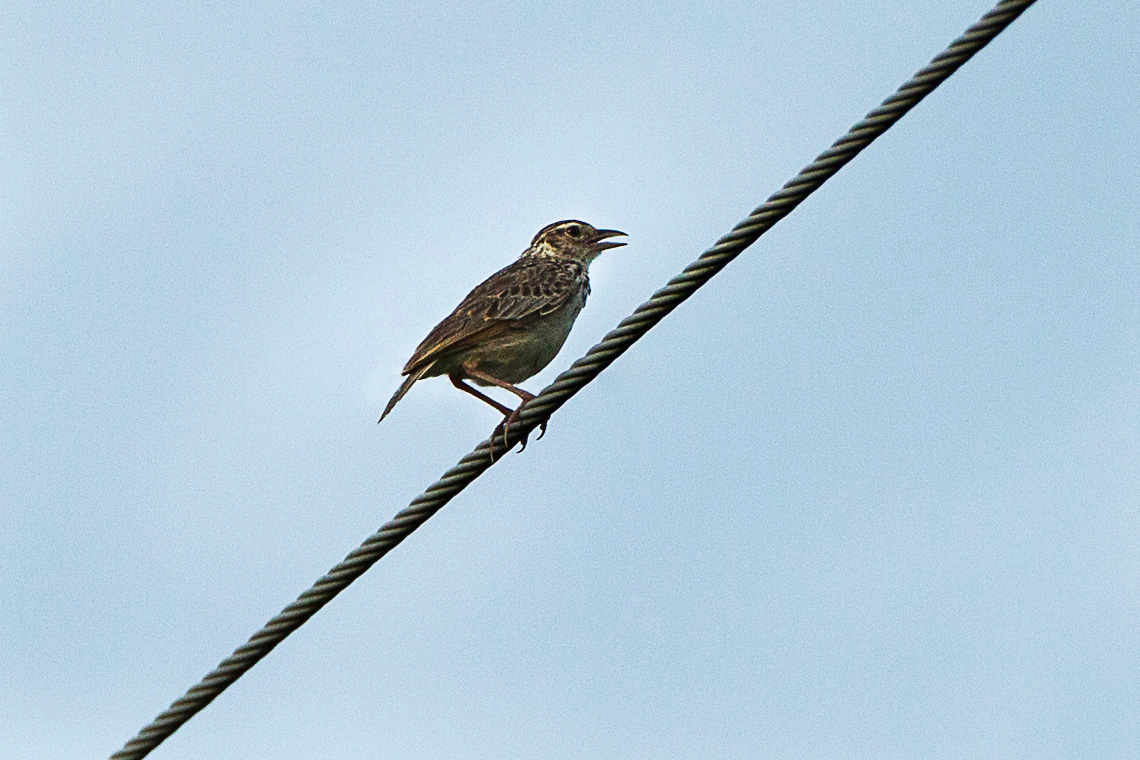

Conservation status
- Least Concern (IUCN 3.1)

Scientific classification
- Kingdom: Animalia
- Phylum: Chordata
- Class: Aves
- Order: Passeriformes
- Family: Alaudidae
- Genus: Plocealauda
- Species: P. erythrocephala

Binomial name
- Plocealauda erythrocephala (Salvadori & Giglioli, 1885)
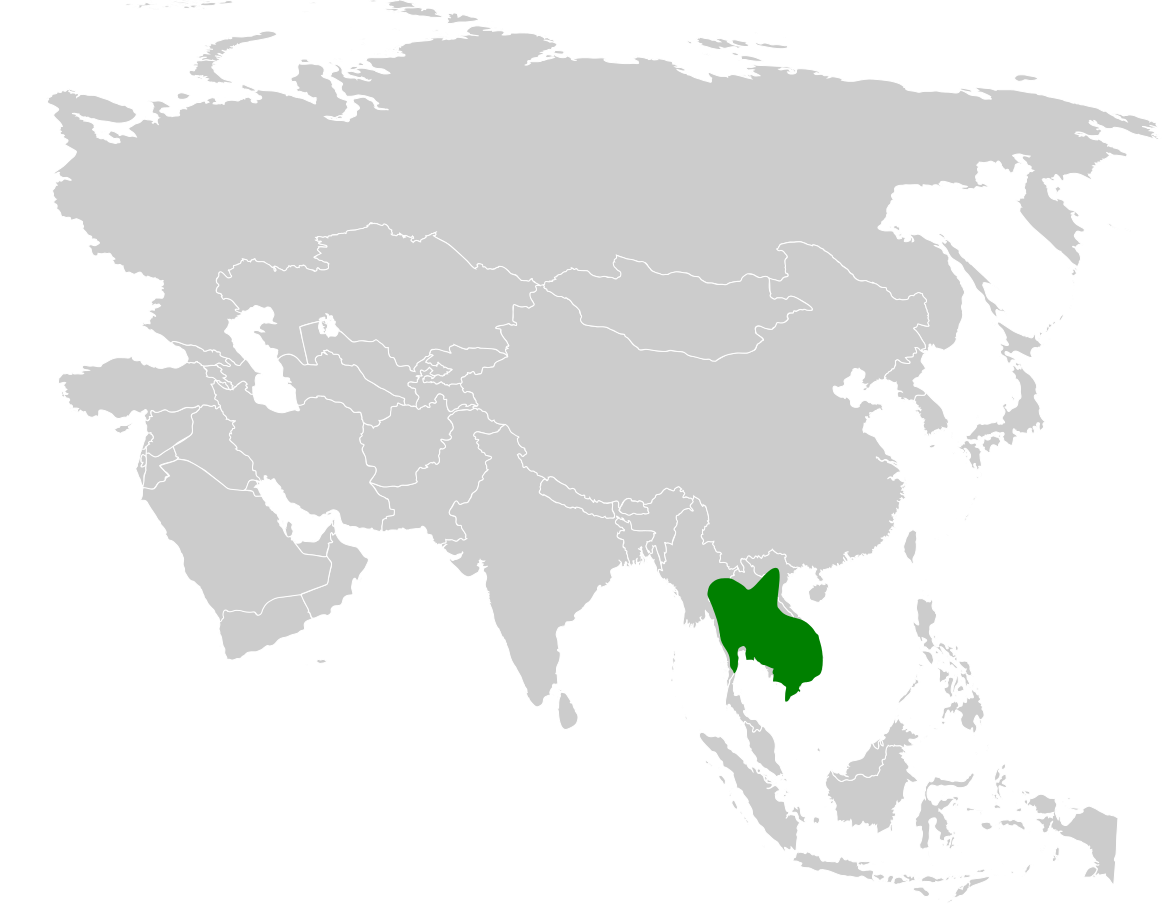

Synonyms
- Mirafra assamica erythrocephala; Mirafra assamica marionae; Mirafra marionae

= Indochinese bush lark =

Species of bird

The Indochinese bush lark (Plocealauda erythrocephala) or Indochinese lark is a species of lark in the family Alaudidae found in southeast Asia.

== Taxonomy and systematics ==
Following work a decade ago by Per Alström, the Indochinese bush lark was split from the Bengal bush lark to form a separate species. The species is monotypic: no subspecies are recognised. The Indochinese bush lark was formerly placed in the genus Mirafra but was one of five species moved to the newly erected genus Plocealauda based on evidence from a large molecular genetic study published in 2023.

== Distribution and habitat ==
The range of the Indochinese bush lark extends over a large swath of southeast Asia, and can be found in Myanmar, Thailand, Cambodia, Vietnam, and Laos.

The Indochinese bush lark is found in a variety of open-space habitats up to 900 m interspersed with trees and shrubs and has adapted to cultivated land. It also exists at forest margins, as well as thickets of bamboo.
