= Bathophilus kingi =

Conservation status
- Least Concern (IUCN 3.1)

Scientific classification
- Domain: Eukaryota
- Kingdom: Animalia
- Phylum: Chordata
- Class: Actinopterygii
- Order: Stomiiformes
- Family: Stomiidae
- Genus: Bathophilus
- Species: B. kingi

Binomial name
- Bathophilus kingi Barnett & Gibbs, 1968

Species of fish

Bathophilus kingi is a species of barbeled dragonfish in the genus Bathophilus. The species has been documented in the Pacific Ocean near Papua New Guinea, and members of the species can be found in depths of up to ~1,100 metres (3,600 ft).
