= Bathophilus filifer =

Conservation status
- Least Concern (IUCN 3.1)

Scientific classification
- Kingdom: Animalia
- Phylum: Chordata
- Class: Actinopterygii
- Order: Stomiiformes
- Family: Stomiidae
- Genus: Bathophilus
- Species: B. filifer

Binomial name
- Bathophilus filifer (Garman, 1899)

Species of fish

Bathophilus filifer is a species of barbeled dragonfish in the genus Bathophilus. The species has been documented in the Pacific Ocean off the coast of California, at a maximum depth of ~1,050 metres (3,440 ft).
