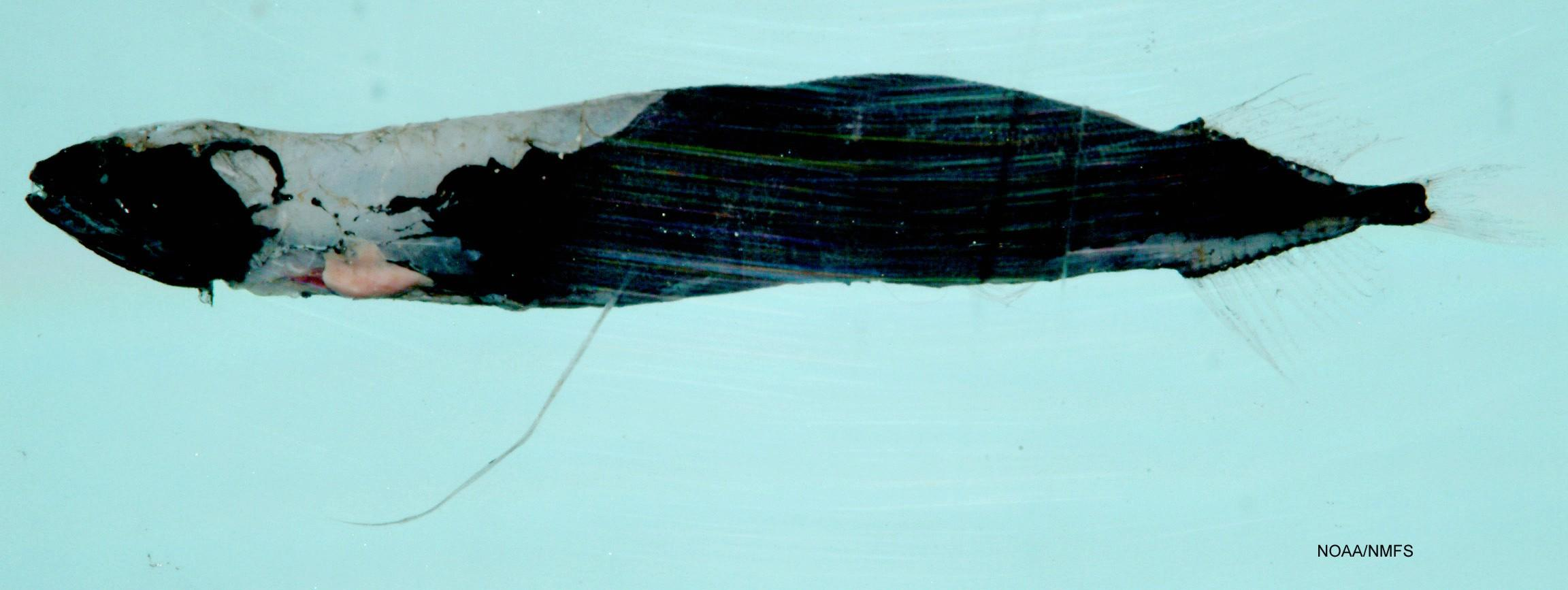
- Bathophilus longipinnis

Scientific classification
- Kingdom: Animalia
- Phylum: Chordata
- Class: Actinopterygii
- Order: Stomiiformes
- Family: Stomiidae
- Subfamily: Melanostomiinae
- Genus: Bathophilus; Giglioli, 1882

Type species
- Bathophilus nigerrimus Giglioli, 1882

Synonyms
- Dactylostomias Garman, 1899; Trichostomias Zugmayer, 1911; Gnathostomias Pappenheim, 1912; Notopodichthys Regan & Trewavas, 1930; Trichochirus Regan & Trewavas, 1930; Nasistomias Koefoed, 1956

= Bathophilus =

Genus of fishes

Bathophilus is a genus of barbeled dragonfishes native to the ocean depths of the Pacific, Atlantic and Indian oceans.

== Species ==
There are currently 16 recognized species in this genus:

- Bathophilus abarbatus M. A. Barnett & Gibbs, 1968 (Barbless dragonfish)
- Bathophilus altipinnis Beebe, 1933
- Bathophilus ater (A. B. Brauer, 1902) (Winged dragonfish)
- Bathophilus brevis Regan & Trewavas, 1930
- Bathophilus digitatus (W. W. Welsh, 1923)
- Bathophilus filifer (Garman, 1899) (Sparing)
- Bathophilus flemingi Aron & McCrery, 1958 (Highfin dragonfish)
- Bathophilus indicus (A. B. Brauer, 1902)
- Bathophilus irregularis Norman, 1930
- Bathophilus kingi M. A. Barnett & Gibbs, 1968
- Bathophilus longipinnis (Pappenheim, 1914)
- Bathophilus nigerrimus Giglioli, 1882 (Scaleless dragonfish)
- Bathophilus pawneei A. E. Parr, 1927 (Pawnee dragonfish)
- Bathophilus proximus Regan & Trewavas, 1930
- Bathophilus schizochirus Regan & Trewavas, 1930
- Bathophilus vaillanti (Zugmayer, 1911)
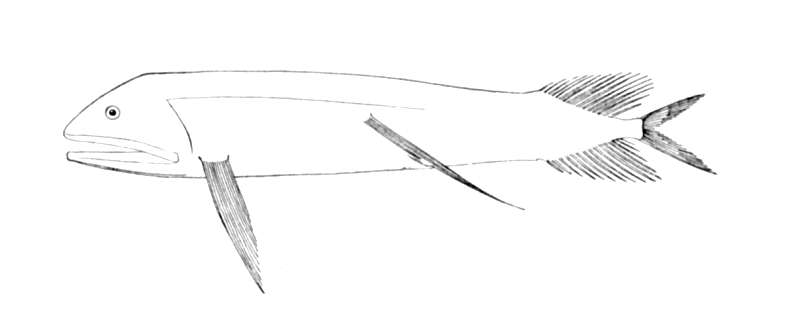
Scaleless Dragonfish (B. nigerrimus)

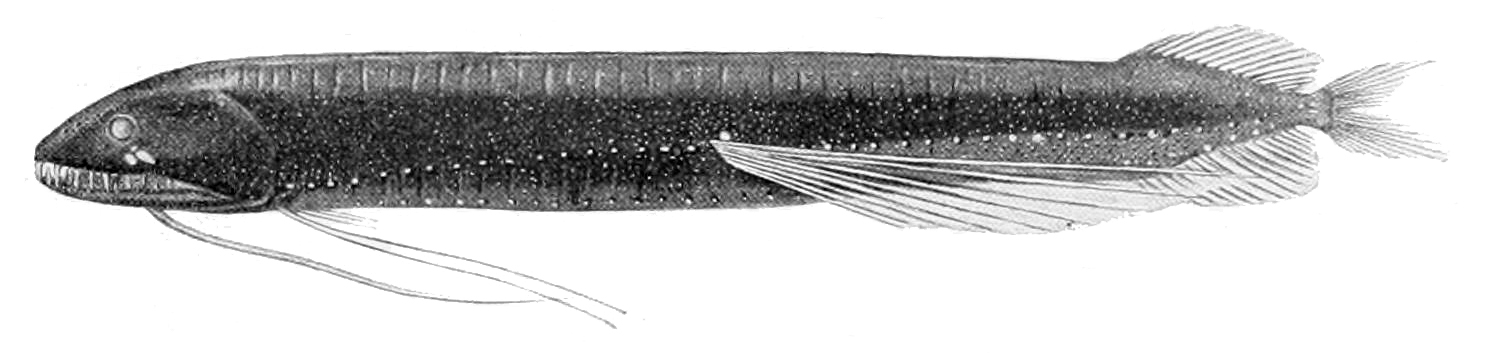
Bathophilus ater

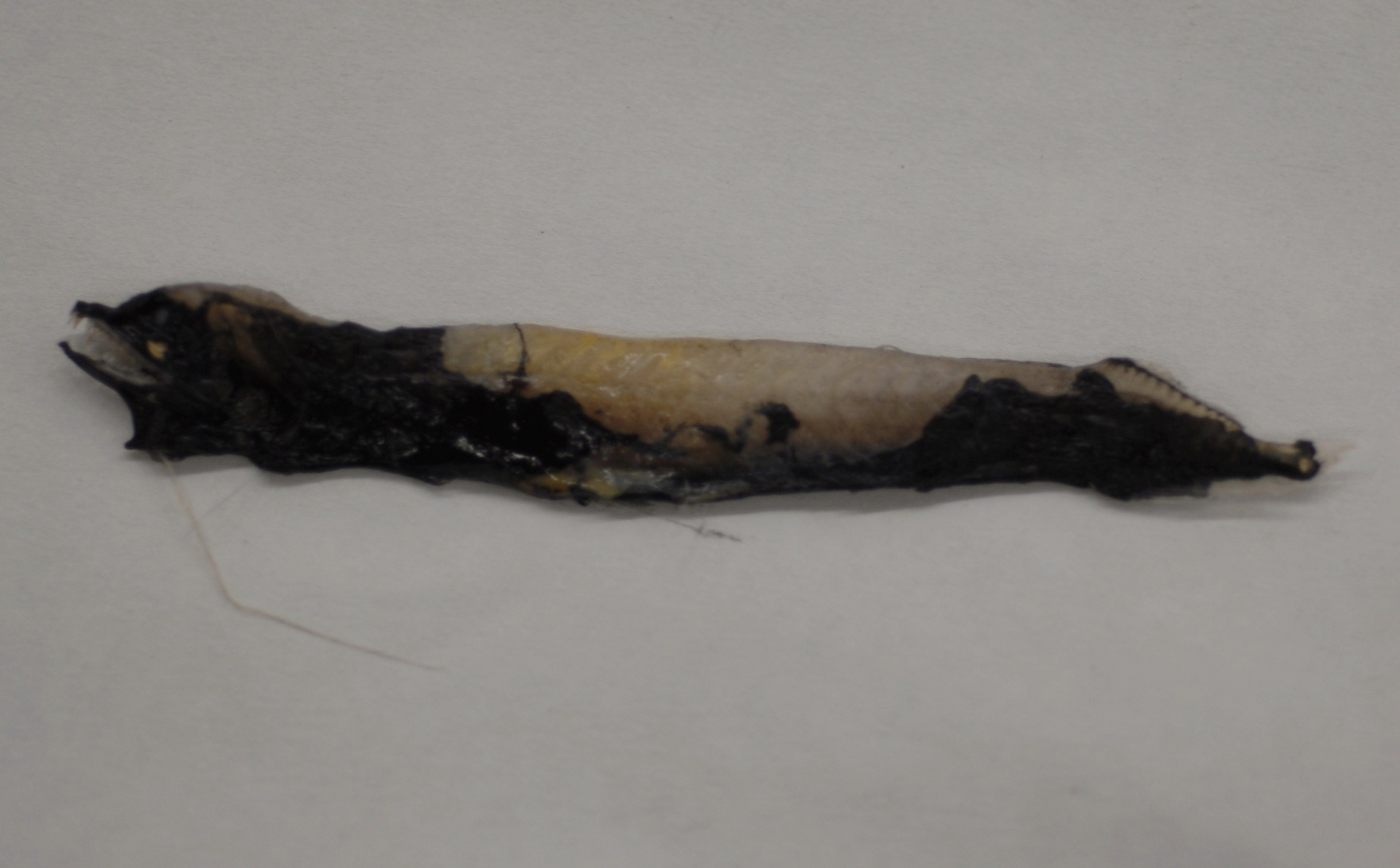
Pawnee dragonfish (Bathophilus pawneei)

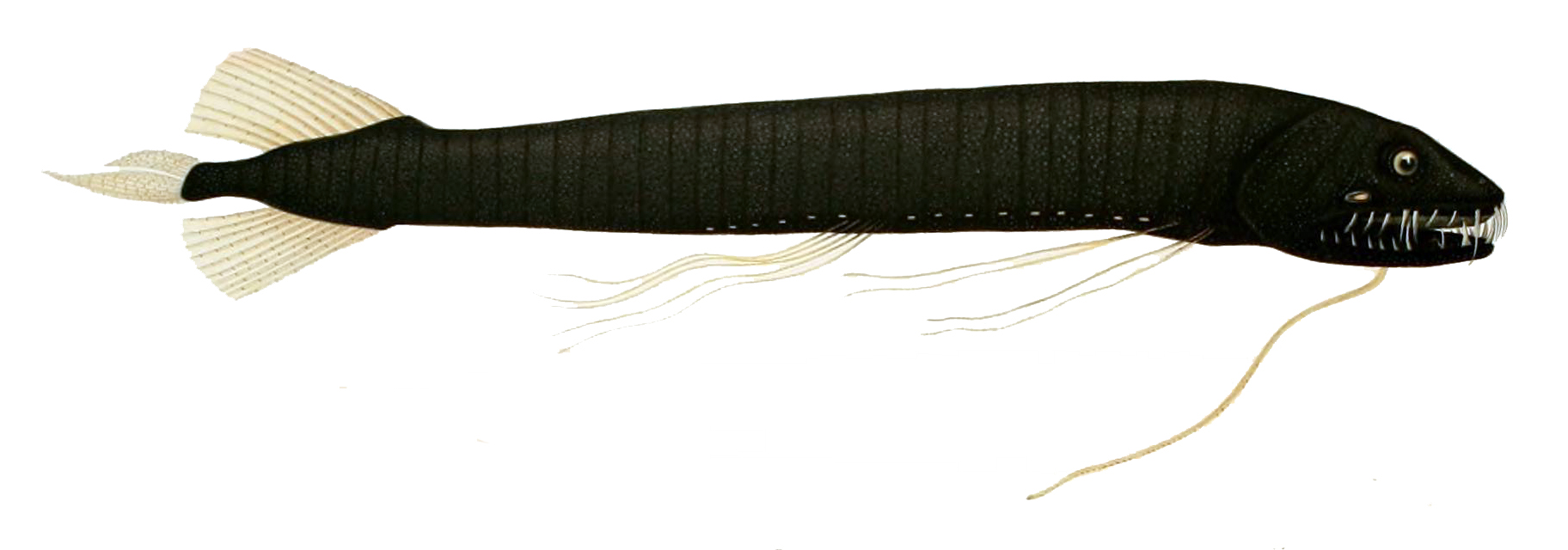
Bathophilus vaillanti
