= Bathophilus irregularis =

Conservation status
- Least Concern (IUCN 3.1)

Scientific classification
- Kingdom: Animalia
- Phylum: Chordata
- Class: Actinopterygii
- Order: Stomiiformes
- Family: Stomiidae
- Genus: Bathophilus
- Species: B. irregularis

Binomial name
- Bathophilus irregularis Norman, 1930

Species of fish

Bathophilus irregularis is a widely distributed species of barbeled dragonfish in the genus Bathophilus. The species has been observed off the coasts of Namibia and South Africa in the Atlantic Ocean, and has also been documented in the Pacific and Indian oceans. Fully-grown adults can reach maximum length of ~12.5 centimeters.
