= Bathophilus schizochirus =

Conservation status
- Least Concern (IUCN 3.1)

Scientific classification
- Kingdom: Animalia
- Phylum: Chordata
- Class: Actinopterygii
- Order: Stomiiformes
- Family: Stomiidae
- Genus: Bathophilus
- Species: B. schizochirus

Binomial name
- Bathophilus schizochirus Regan & Trewavas, 1930

Species of fish

Bathophilus schizochirus is a widely distributed species of barbeled dragonfish in the genus Bathophilus. The species has been documented in the Atlantic, Pacific and Indian oceans, and fully-grown members of the species can reach a maximum length of ~10.3 centimeters.
