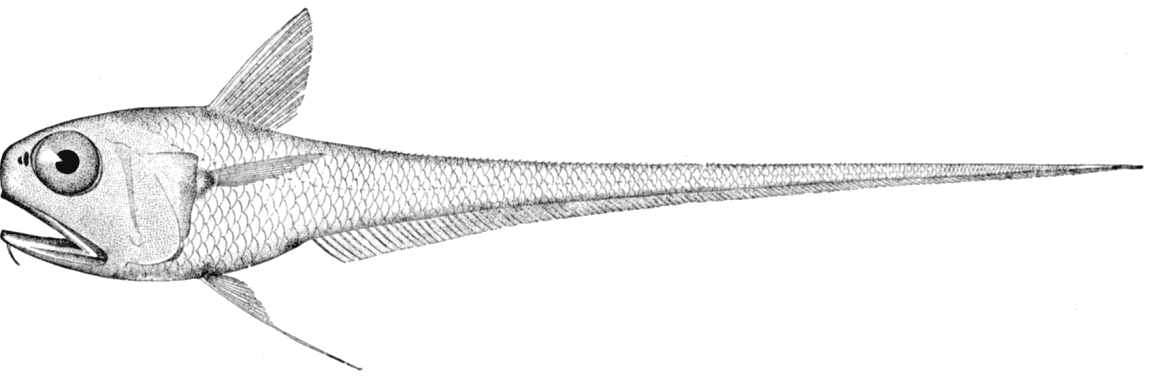
- Hymenocephalus italicus

Scientific classification
- Domain: Eukaryota
- Kingdom: Animalia
- Phylum: Chordata
- Class: Actinopterygii
- Order: Gadiformes
- Family: Macrouridae
- Subfamily: Macrourinae
- Genus: Hymenocephalus; Giglioli, 1884

Type species
- Hymenocephalus italicus Giglioli, 1884

Synonyms
- Hymenogadus Gilbert & Hubbs, 1920

= Hymenocephalus (fish) =

Hymenocephalus Temporal range: 33.9–0 Ma Early Oligocene to Present

Genus of fishes

Hymenocephalus is a genus of rattails.

== Species ==
There are currently 27 recognized species in this genus:

- Hymenocephalus aeger C. H. Gilbert & C. L. Hubbs, 1920 (Plain-tail whiptail)
- Hymenocephalus antraeus C. H. Gilbert & Cramer, 1897
- Hymenocephalus aterrimus C. H. Gilbert, 1905 (Blackest whiptail)
- Hymenocephalus barbatulus C. H. Gilbert & C. L. Hubbs, 1920
- Hymenocephalus billsam N. B. Marshall & Iwamoto, 1973
- Hymenocephalus fuscus P. J. McMillan & Iwamoto, 2014 (Black membranehead)
- Hymenocephalus grimaldii M. C. W. Weber, 1913
- Hymenocephalus hachijoensis Okamura, 1970
- Hymenocephalus heterolepis (Alcock, 1889)
- Hymenocephalus italicus Giglioli, 1884 (Glass-head grenadier)
- Hymenocephalus iwamotoi Schwarzhans, 2014 (Iwamoto's whiptail)
- Hymenocephalus lethonemus D. S. Jordan & C. H. Gilbert, 1904
- Hymenocephalus longibarbis (Günther, 1887) (Long-barb whiptail)
- Hymenocephalus longipes H. M. Smith & Radcliffe, 1912
- Hymenocephalus maculicaudus P. J. McMillan & Iwamoto, 2014 (Spotty-tail membranehead)
- Hymenocephalus megalops Iwamoto & Merrett, 1997 (Big-eye whiptail)
- Hymenocephalus nascens C. H. Gilbert & C. L. Hubbs, 1920 (Nascent membranehead)
- Hymenocephalus neglectissimus Sazonov & Iwamoto, 1992
- Hymenocephalus nesaeae Merrett & Iwamoto, 2000
- Hymenocephalus papyraceus D. S. Jordan & C. H. Gilbert, 1904
- Hymenocephalus punt Schwarzhans, 2014
- Hymenocephalus sazonovi Schwarzhans, 2014
- Hymenocephalus semipellucidus Sazonov & Iwamoto, 1992
- Hymenocephalus striatissimus D. S. Jordan & C. H. Gilbert, 1904
- Hymenocephalus striatulus C. H. Gilbert, 1905
- Hymenocephalus torvus H. M. Smith & Radcliffe, 1912
- Hymenocephalus yamasakiorum Nakayama, Endo & Schwarzhans, 2015 (Black-tailed membranehead)
