= Bathophilus indicus =

Conservation status
- Least Concern (IUCN 3.1)

Scientific classification
- Domain: Eukaryota
- Kingdom: Animalia
- Phylum: Chordata
- Class: Actinopterygii
- Order: Stomiiformes
- Family: Stomiidae
- Genus: Bathophilus
- Species: B. indicus

Binomial name
- Bathophilus indicus (Brauer, 1902)

Species of fish

Bathophilus indicus is a species of barbeled dragonfish in the genus Bathophilus. The species has been observed in the Pacific Ocean, and is rarely seen due to the depths that members of the species reside in. When fully-grown, a member can reach a maximum length of ~9 centimeters.
