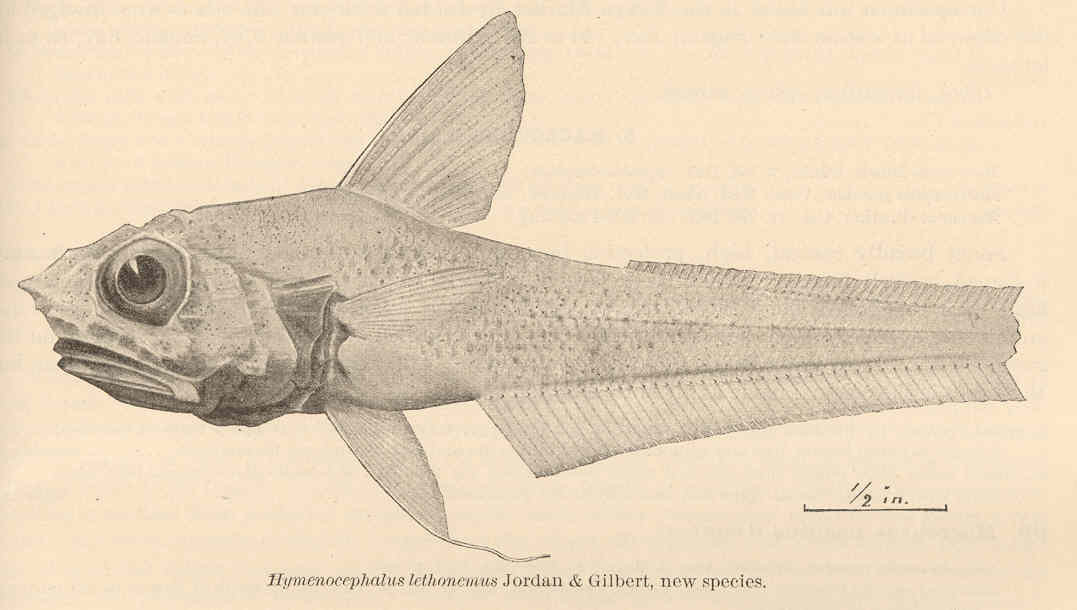

Scientific classification
- Domain: Eukaryota
- Kingdom: Animalia
- Phylum: Chordata
- Class: Actinopterygii
- Order: Gadiformes
- Family: Macrouridae
- Subfamily: Macrourinae
- Genus: Hymenocephalus
- Species: H. lethonemus

Binomial name
- Hymenocephalus lethonemus Jordan & Gilbert, 1904

= Hymenocephalus lethonemus =

Species of fish

Hymenocephalus lethonemus is a species of rattail. It occurs at depths of up to 485 m (1591 ft) in the waters off southern Japan, the Philippines and northern Taiwan.

This is a small, slender rattail with a total length of up to 14 cm (5.1 in). It has a fairly long, sharp snout, small eyes, a large mouth and no chin barbel. There is a long bioluminescent organ with two external lenses just in front of the anus.
