= Bathophilus proximus =

Conservation status
- Data Deficient (IUCN 3.1)

Scientific classification
- Kingdom: Animalia
- Phylum: Chordata
- Class: Actinopterygii
- Order: Stomiiformes
- Family: Stomiidae
- Genus: Bathophilus
- Species: B. proximus

Binomial name
- Bathophilus proximus Regan & Trewavas, 1930

Species of fish

Bathophilus proximus is a species of barbeled dragonfish in the genus Bathophilus. The species has been documented in the northwest Atlantic Ocean, and fully-grown members of the species can reach a maximum length of ~5 centimeters.
