= Bathophilus altipinnis =

Conservation status
- Least Concern (IUCN 3.1)

Scientific classification
- Kingdom: Animalia
- Phylum: Chordata
- Class: Actinopterygii
- Order: Stomiiformes
- Family: Stomiidae
- Genus: Bathophilus
- Species: B. altipinnis

Binomial name
- Bathophilus altipinnis Beebe, 1933

Species of fish

Bathophilus altipinnis is a species of barbeled dragonfish in the genus Bathophilus. The species has been documented in the Gulf of Mexico and off the coast of Hawaii. Fully-grown members of the species can reach a maximum length of ~6.3 centimeters.
