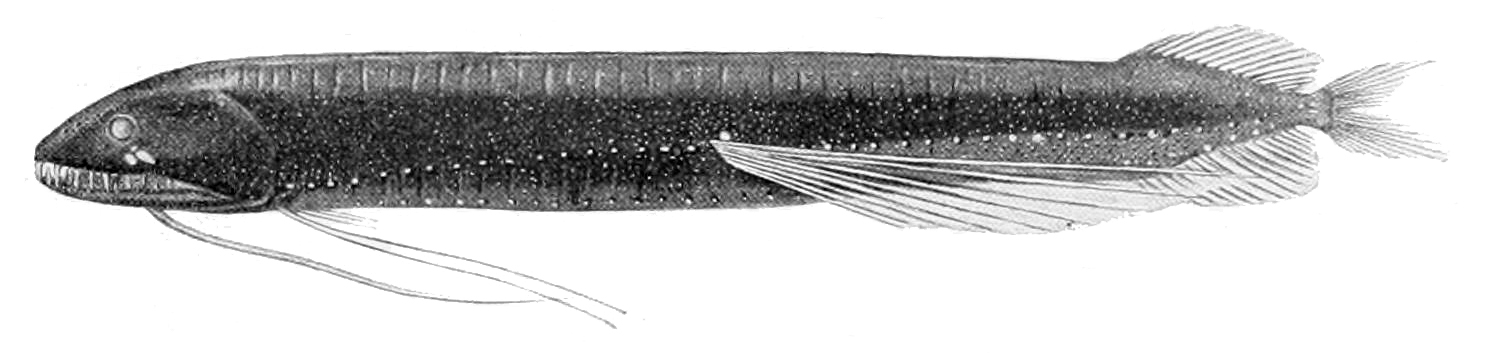

Conservation status
- Least Concern (IUCN 3.1)

Scientific classification
- Domain: Eukaryota
- Kingdom: Animalia
- Phylum: Chordata
- Class: Actinopterygii
- Order: Stomiiformes
- Family: Stomiidae
- Genus: Bathophilus
- Species: B. ater

Binomial name
- Bathophilus ater (Brauer, 1902)

= Bathophilus ater =

Species of fish

Bathophilus ater is a species of barbeled dragonfish in the genus Bathophilus. The species has been observed in the Pacific and Atlantic oceans off the coasts of Chile and Australia, and fully-grown members of the species can reach maximum length of ~15 centimetres (5.9 in).
