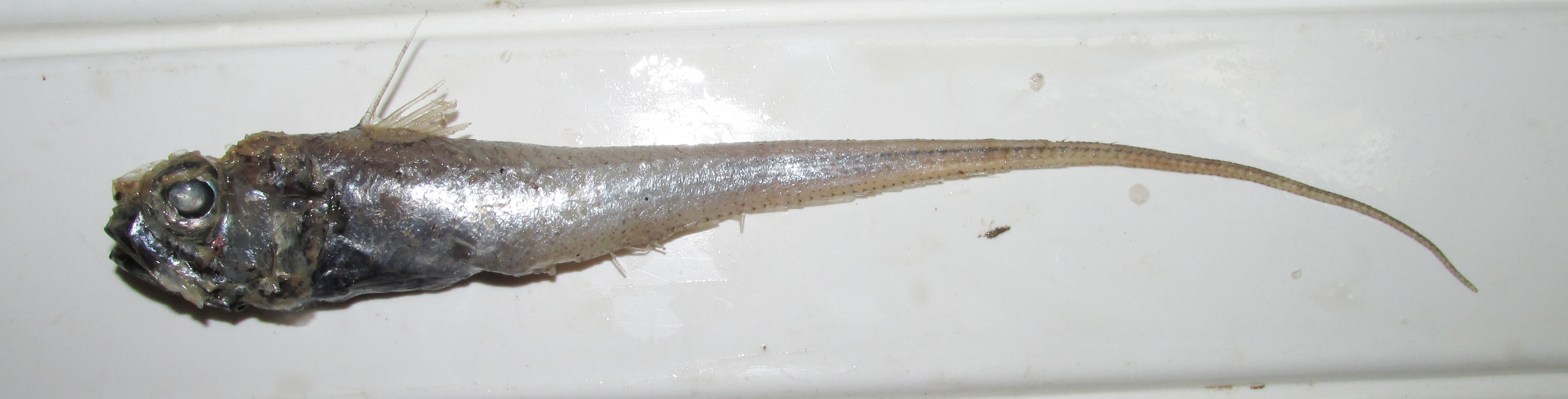

Conservation status
- Least Concern (IUCN 3.1)

Scientific classification
- Kingdom: Animalia
- Phylum: Chordata
- Class: Actinopterygii
- Order: Gadiformes
- Family: Macrouridae
- Genus: Hymenocephalus
- Species: H. italicus

Binomial name
- Hymenocephalus italicus (Giglioli, 1884)

Synonyms
- Bathygadus cavernosus Goode & Bean, 1885; Himenocephalus italicus Giglioli, 1884; Hymenocephalus (Hymenocephalus) italicus Giglioli, 1884; Hymenocephalus cavernosus Goode & Bean, 1885; Macrurus cavernosus Goode & Bean, 1886; Macrurus italicus Giglioli, 1884

= Glasshead grenadier =

Species of fish

The glasshead grenadier (Hymenocephalus italicus) is a species of fish in the family Macrouridae.

== Description ==
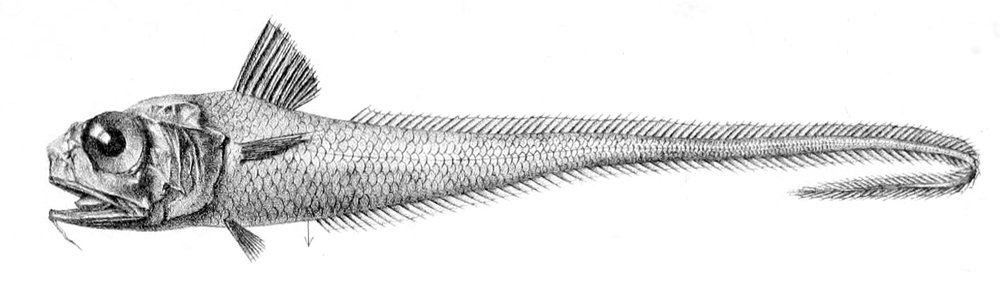
Diagram

The glasshead grenadier has a measurement of up to 25 cm (9.8 in). Its snout is obtuse and projects slightly beyond the mouth. Its barbel is small, and its scales are thin, deciduous, spiny and large.

== Habitat ==
The glasshead grenadier lives in the Atlantic Ocean; it is benthopelagic, living at depths of 100–1,400 m (330–4,590 ft).

== Behaviour ==
The glasshead grenadier feeds on pelagic copepods, euphausiids and gammarid amphipods, shrimp, ostracods, cumaceans and other small crustaceans.
