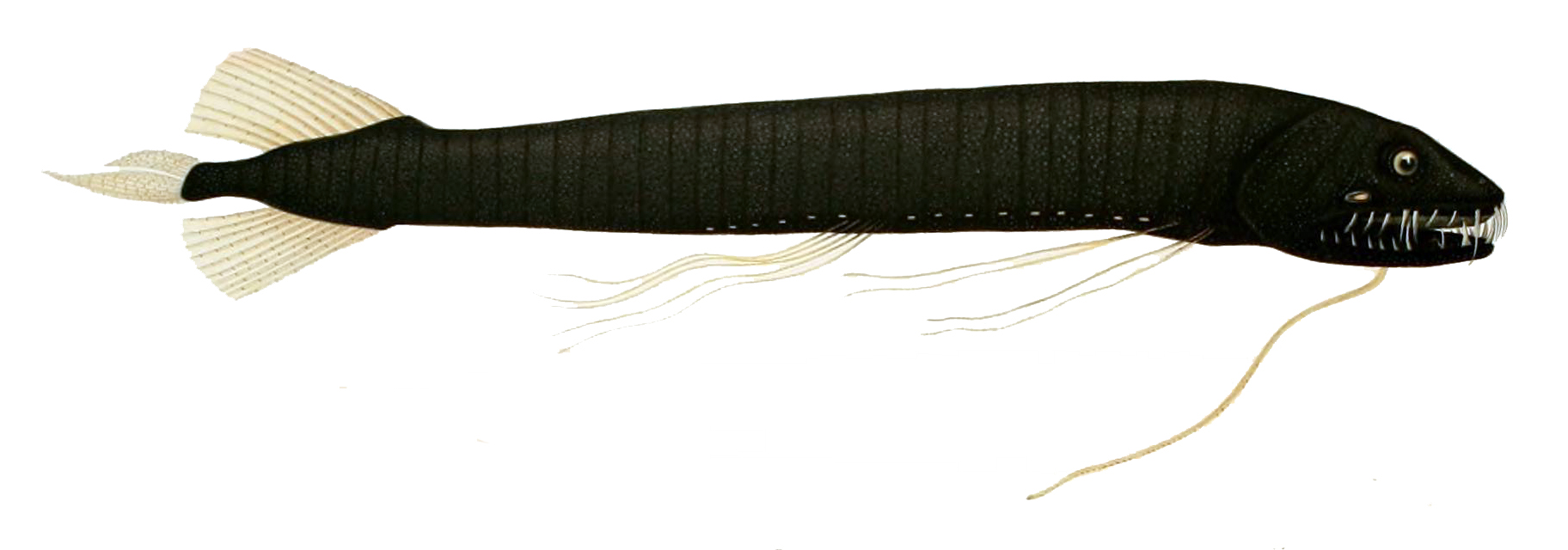

Conservation status
- Least Concern (IUCN 3.1)

Scientific classification
- Kingdom: Animalia
- Phylum: Chordata
- Class: Actinopterygii
- Order: Stomiiformes
- Family: Stomiidae
- Genus: Bathophilus
- Species: B. vaillanti

Binomial name
- Bathophilus vaillanti (Zugmayer, 1911)

= Bathophilus vaillanti =

Species of fish

Bathophilus vaillanti is a species of barbeled dragonfish in the genus Bathophilus. The species has been documented in the Atlantic and Pacific oceans, and fully-grown members of the species can reach a maximum length of ~18 centimeters.

== Etymology ==
The fish is named in honor of French zoologist Léon Vaillant (1834–1914), of the Muséum national d’Histoire naturelle in Paris.
