= Bathophilus abarbatus =

Conservation status
- Least Concern (IUCN 3.1)

Scientific classification
- Domain: Eukaryota
- Kingdom: Animalia
- Phylum: Chordata
- Class: Actinopterygii
- Order: Stomiiformes
- Family: Stomiidae
- Genus: Bathophilus
- Species: B. abarbatus

Binomial name
- Bathophilus abarbatus Barnett & Gibbs, 1968

Species of fish

Bathophilus abarbatus is a species of barbeled dragonfish in the genus Bathophilus. They have been observed in the Pacific Ocean at a maximum depth of ~230 metres (750 ft).
