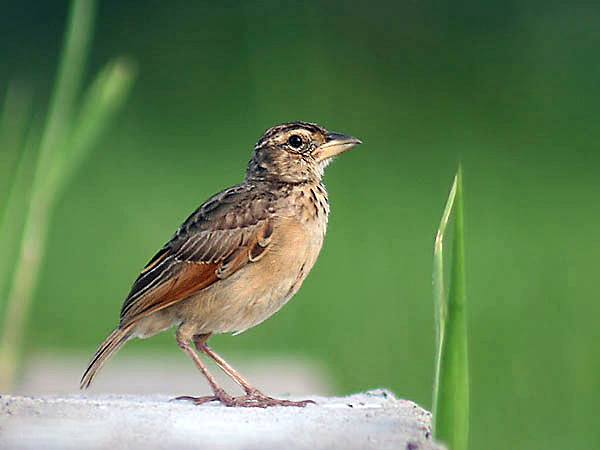
- Bengal bush lark (Plocealauda assamica)

Scientific classification
- Kingdom: Animalia
- Phylum: Chordata
- Class: Aves
- Order: Passeriformes
- Family: Alaudidae
- Genus: Plocealauda; Alström, Mohammadi, Enbody, Irestedt, Engelbrecht, Crochet, Guillaumet, Rancilhac, Tieleman, Olsson, Donald & Stervander, 2023

Type species
- Miafra assamica Horsfield, 1840

= Plocealauda =

Genus of birds

Plocealauda is a genus of larks in the family Alaudidae. Introduced in 2023, it contains five species that were formerly placed in the genus Mirafra. Their distributions range from the Indian subcontinent to Southeast Asia.

== Taxonomy and systematics ==
A 2023 molecular phylogenetic study of the lark family Alaudidae by the Swedish ornithologist Per Alström and collaborators found that the genus Mirafra contained deep internal genetic divergences. They therefore proposed splitting Mirafra into four genera, each corresponding to a major clade. Names were available for three of the clades, but for the fourth clade, they introduced the new name Plocealauda and designated the type species as Miafra assamica Horsfield, 1840, the Bengal bush lark. The name Plocealauda is a portmanteau of the genera Ploceus, introduced by Georges Cuvier for the weavers in 1816, and Alauda, introduced by Carl Linnaeus for the larks in 1785.

=== Species ===
The genus Plocealauda contains the following five species, all of which include "bush lark" in their English name.

Image	Common name	Scientific name
	Burmese bush lark	Plocealauda microptera
	Indochinese bush lark	Plocealauda erythrocephala
	Jerdon's bush lark	Plocealauda affinis
	Indian bush lark	Plocealauda erythroptera
	Bengal bush lark	Plocealauda assamica

Two species in other genera also have "bush lark" in their English names: the singing bush lark (Mirafra javanica) and the rusty bush lark (Calendulauda rufa).
