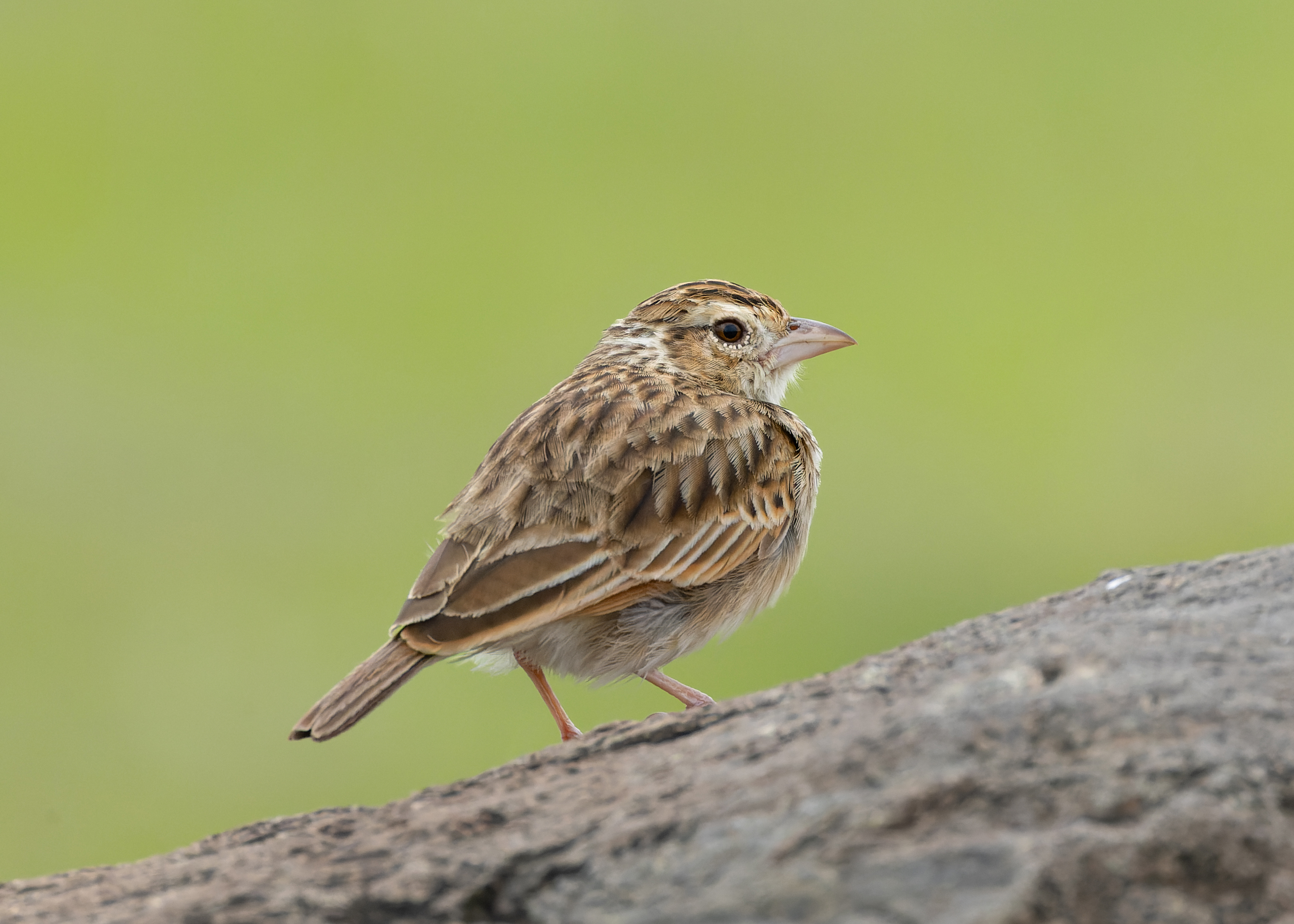
- Plocealauda erythroptera in Bhigwan, Maharashtra, India.

Conservation status
- Least Concern (IUCN 3.1)

Scientific classification
- Kingdom: Animalia
- Phylum: Chordata
- Class: Aves
- Order: Passeriformes
- Family: Alaudidae
- Genus: Plocealauda
- Species: P. erythroptera

Binomial name
- Plocealauda erythroptera (Blyth, 1845)
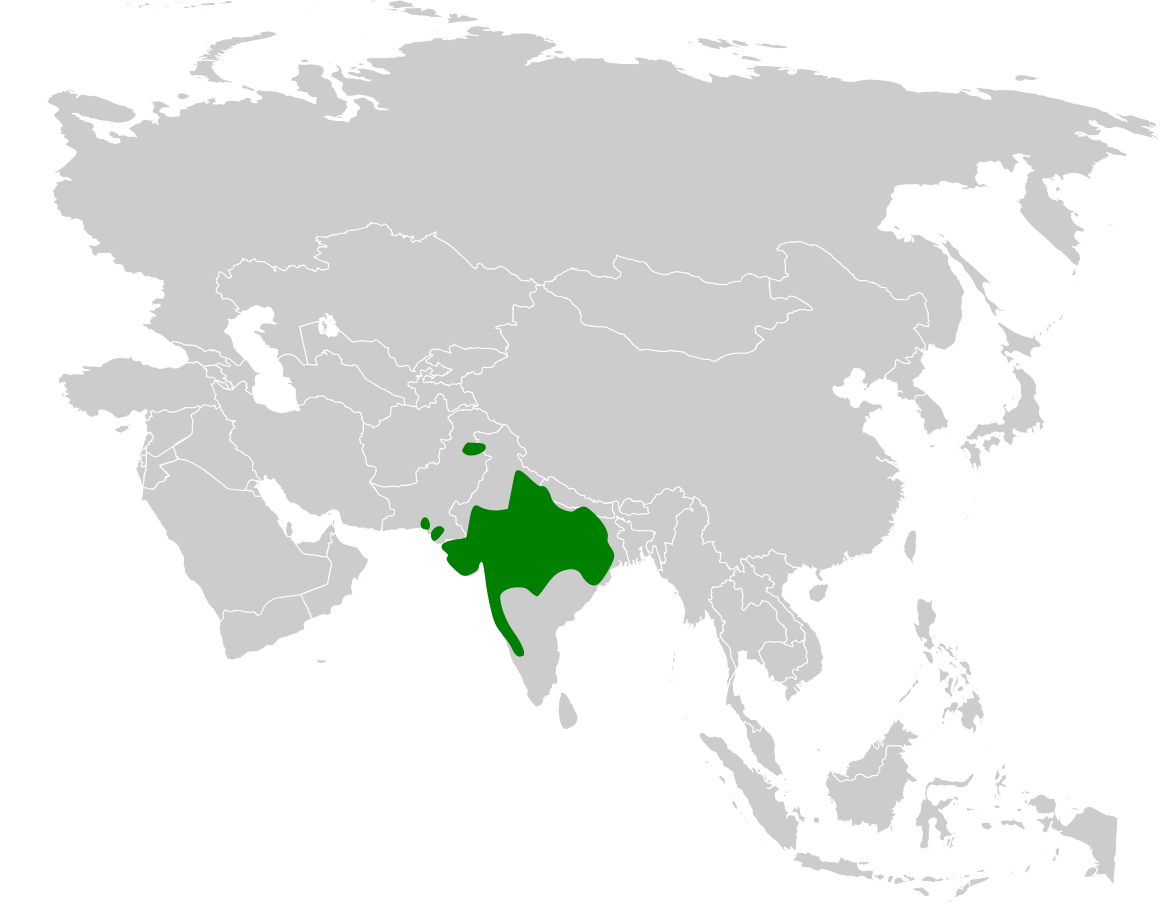

= Indian bush lark =

Species of bird

The Indian bush lark (Plocealauda erythroptera) is a species of lark in the family Alaudidae found in South Asia.

== Taxonomy and systematics ==
The Indian bush lark was formerly placed in the genus Mirafra. It is one of five species moved to a newly erected genus, Plocealauda, based on evidence from a large molecular genetic study published in 2023. The species is monotypic: no subspecies are recognised.

The alternate names "red-winged lark" and "red-winged bush lark" are more commonly used to describe the red-winged lark (M. hypermetra). Other alternate names of the Indian bush lark are "Indian lark", "Indian red-winged lark", "red-winged singing bushlark" and "rusty-winged lark".

== Description ==
The plumage of the Indian bush lark is pale and it has a cheek patch completely bounded by a white supercilium and post-auricular border. The crown and upper-parts are heavily streaked. The pale underparts have large spots on the breast. Most of its wing coverts, tertials and central tail feathers have pale centres. The primary coverts look all brown. The rufous wing bars are diagnostic but care must be taken not to confuse the bird with Jerdon's bush lark in the central Western Ghats and country around where their ranges overlap. Jerdon's bush lark is darker with more rufous on the wings. It is distinguished from Jerdon's bush lark by its shorter bill and legs and longer tail.

It sings from bush tops but does not usually perch on trees or wires. The calls are similar to that of Jerdon's bush lark but are lower and have longer rattling tremolos often falling in pitch.

== Distribution and habitat ==
The Indian bush lark is most commonly found in arid areas. It is found in Pakistan and north-western, central and south-central India.

== Behaviour and ecology ==
The song-flight during the mating season is an amazing spectacle. The bird flutters high over the ground, then holds its wings in an open "V" and "parachutes" down to its perch uttering its song consisting of short tweets and cheeps in three syllables followed by a longer fourth syllable. This combination is repeated till the bird perches again.

== Gallery ==
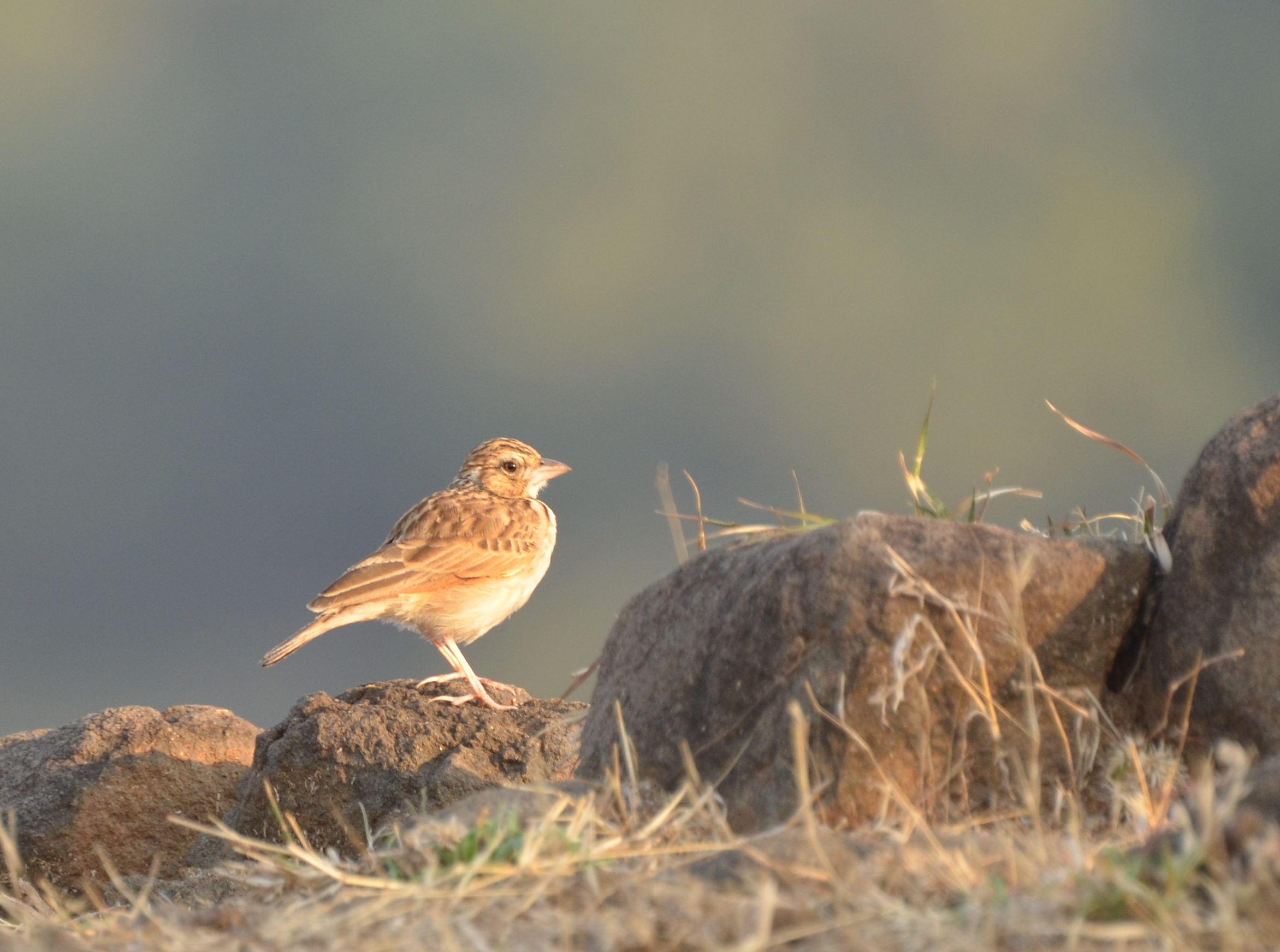
Indian bushlark (Mirafra erythroptera)

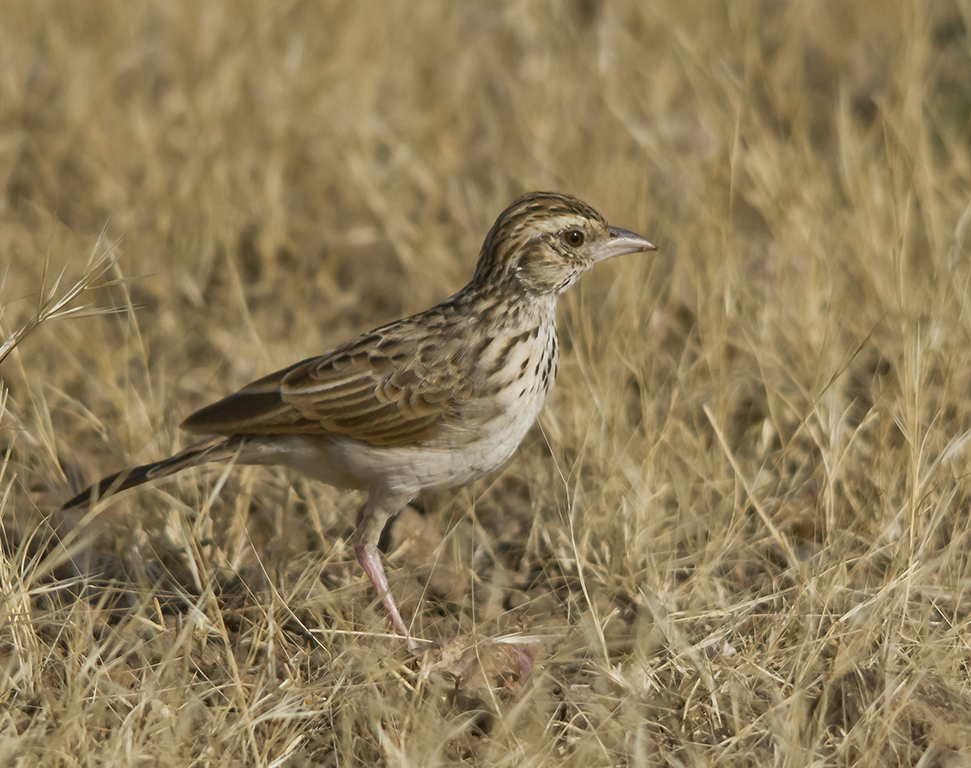
Indian bushlark at Rajkot
