= Bathophilus flemingi =

Conservation status
- Least Concern (IUCN 3.1)

Scientific classification
- Kingdom: Animalia
- Phylum: Chordata
- Class: Actinopterygii
- Order: Stomiiformes
- Family: Stomiidae
- Genus: Bathophilus
- Species: B. flemingi

Binomial name
- Bathophilus flemingi Aron & McCrery, 1958

Species of fish

Bathophilus flemingi is a species of barbeled dragonfish in the genus Bathophilus. The species has been documented in the Pacific Ocean near Alaska, and fully-grown members of the species can reach a maximum length of ~16 centimeters.
