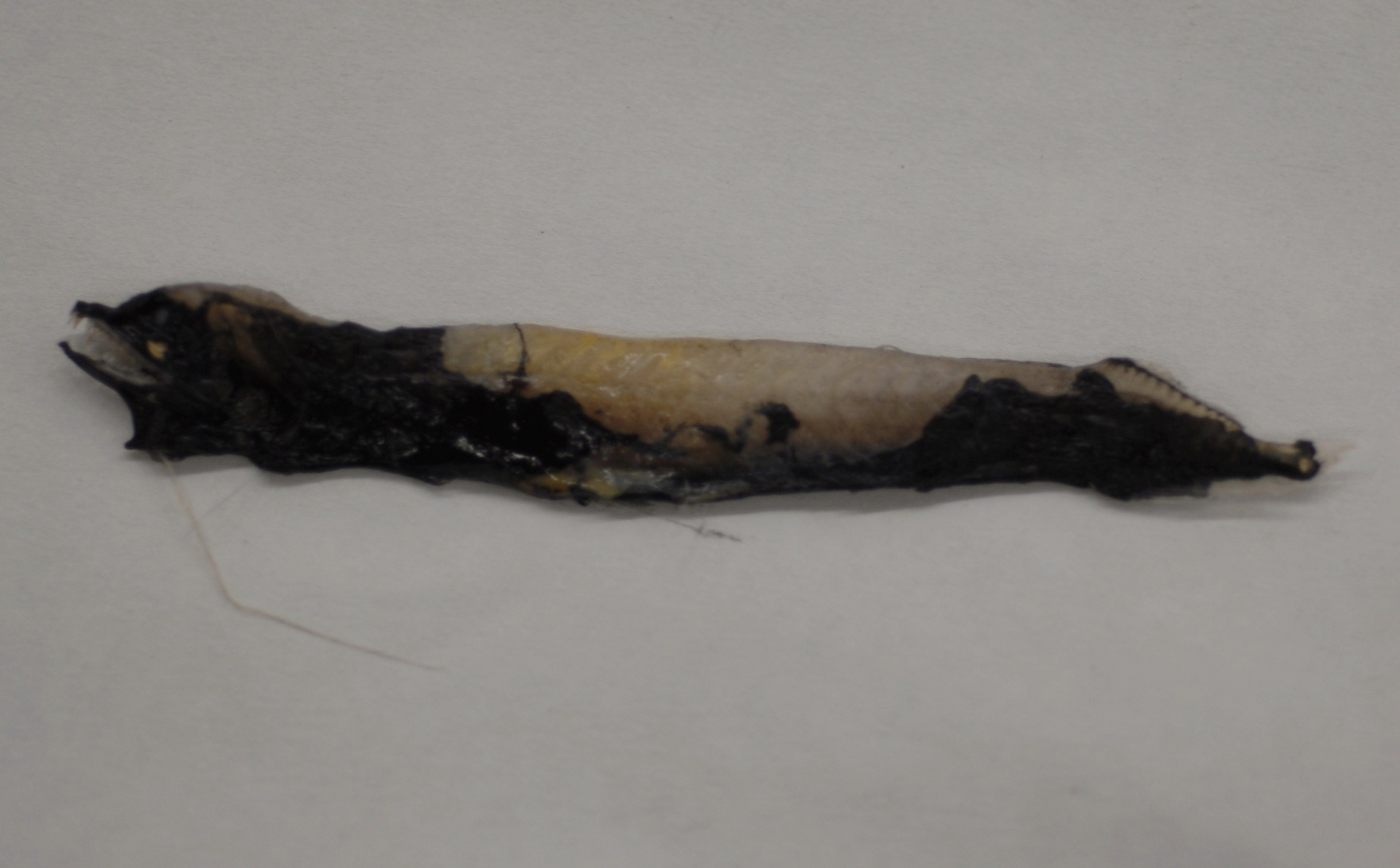

Conservation status
- Least Concern (IUCN 3.1)

Scientific classification
- Domain: Eukaryota
- Kingdom: Animalia
- Phylum: Chordata
- Class: Actinopterygii
- Order: Stomiiformes
- Family: Stomiidae
- Genus: Bathophilus
- Species: B. pawneei

Binomial name
- Bathophilus pawneei Parr, 1927

= Bathophilus pawneei =

Species of fish

Bathophilus pawneei is a widely distributed species of barbeled dragonfish in the genus Bathophilus. The species has been documented in the Atlantic, Pacific and Indian oceans, and fully-grown members of the species can reach a maximum length of ~12.2 centimeters.
