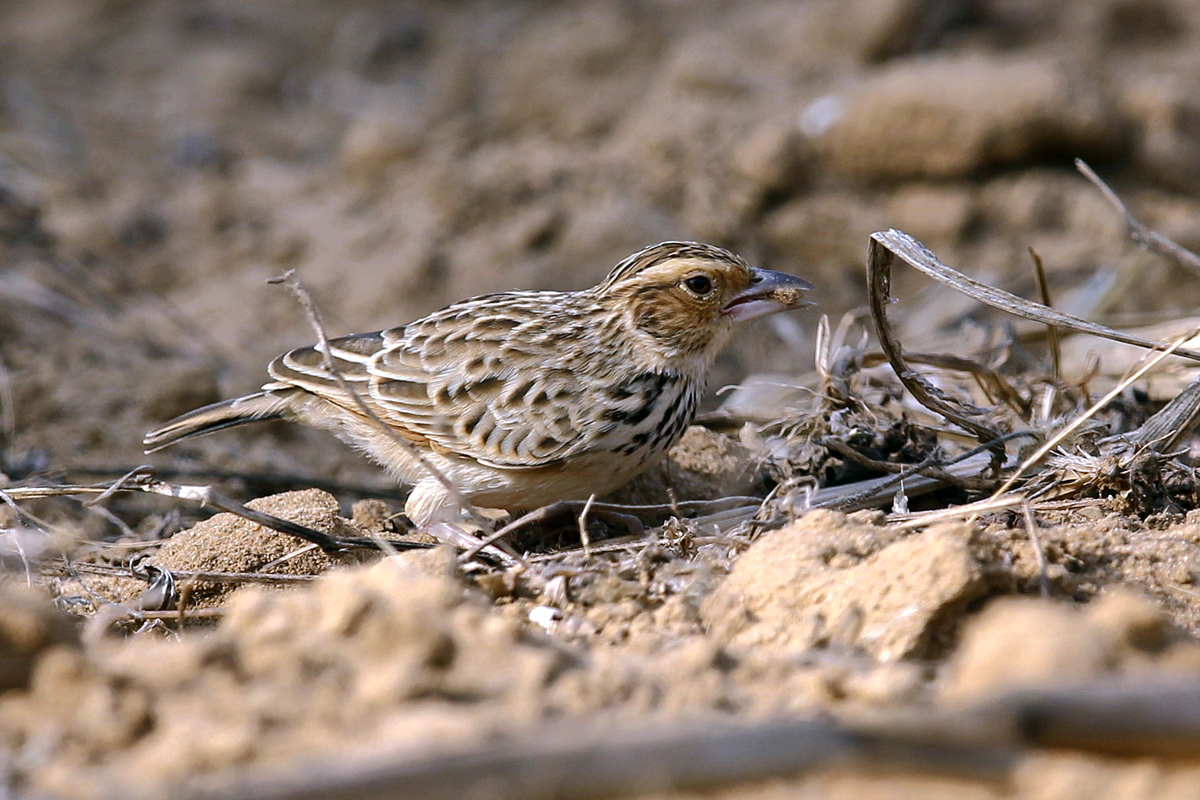

Conservation status
- Least Concern (IUCN 3.1)

Scientific classification
- Kingdom: Animalia
- Phylum: Chordata
- Class: Aves
- Order: Passeriformes
- Family: Alaudidae
- Genus: Plocealauda
- Species: P. microptera

Binomial name
- Plocealauda microptera (Hume, 1873)
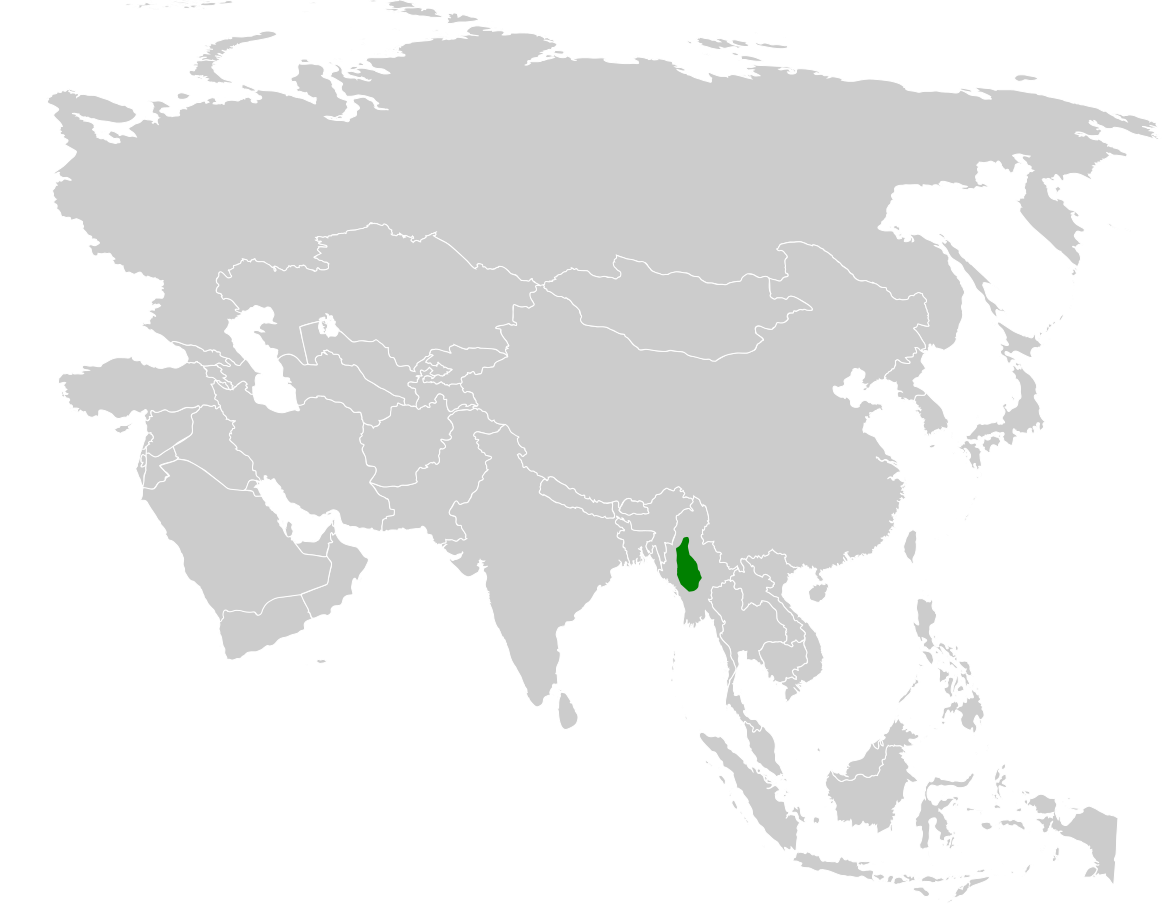

Synonyms
- Mirafra assamica microptera

= Burmese bush lark =

Species of bird

The Burmese bush lark (Plocealauda microptera) or Burmese lark, is a species of lark in the family Alaudidae found in Southeast Asia.

== Taxonomy and systematics ==
The Burmese bush lark was previous treated as a subspecies of the Bengal bush lark until split following genetic analysis by the Swedish ornithologist Per Alström. It was formerly included in the genus Mirafra but is one of five species moved to a newly erected genus Plocealauda based on the evidence from a large molecular genetic study published in 2023. The species is monotypic: no subspecies are recognised.

== Distribution and habitat ==
Although the global population of the Burmese bush lark has not yet been quantified, it is believed to be locally numerous within its sizable range in central Myanmar, where it is endemic, and is estimated to have an extent of occurrence of anywhere from 50,000 to 100,000 km^{2}.

The Burmese bush lark is a common denizen of a variety of habitats, including grasslands, fallow farm fields, sandy areas, and arable land, especially those with some trees and shrubs.
