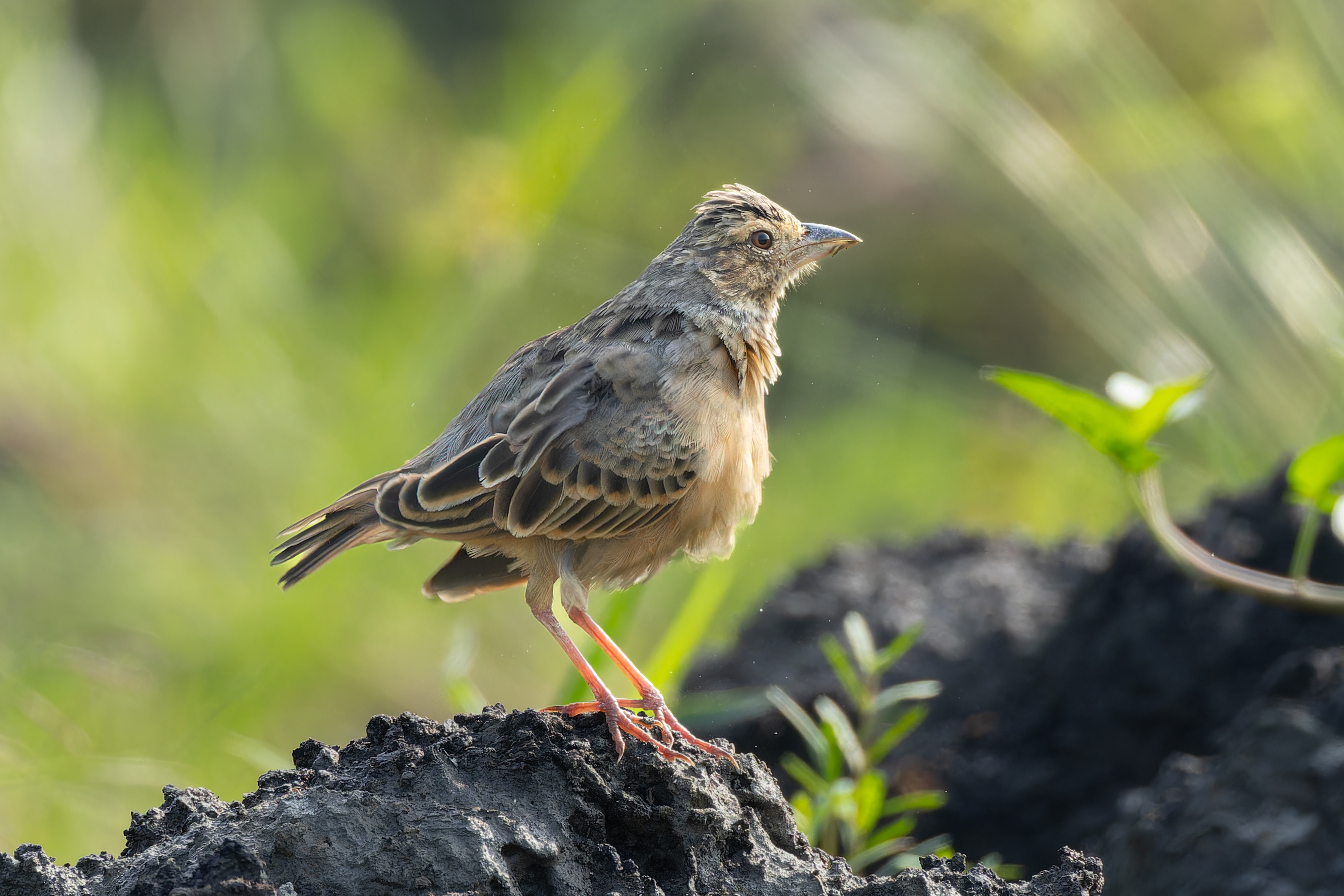
- In Baruipur, West Bengal, India

Conservation status
- Least Concern (IUCN 3.1)

Scientific classification
- Kingdom: Animalia
- Phylum: Chordata
- Class: Aves
- Order: Passeriformes
- Family: Alaudidae
- Genus: Plocealauda
- Species: P. assamica

Binomial name
- Plocealauda assamica (Horsfield, 1840)
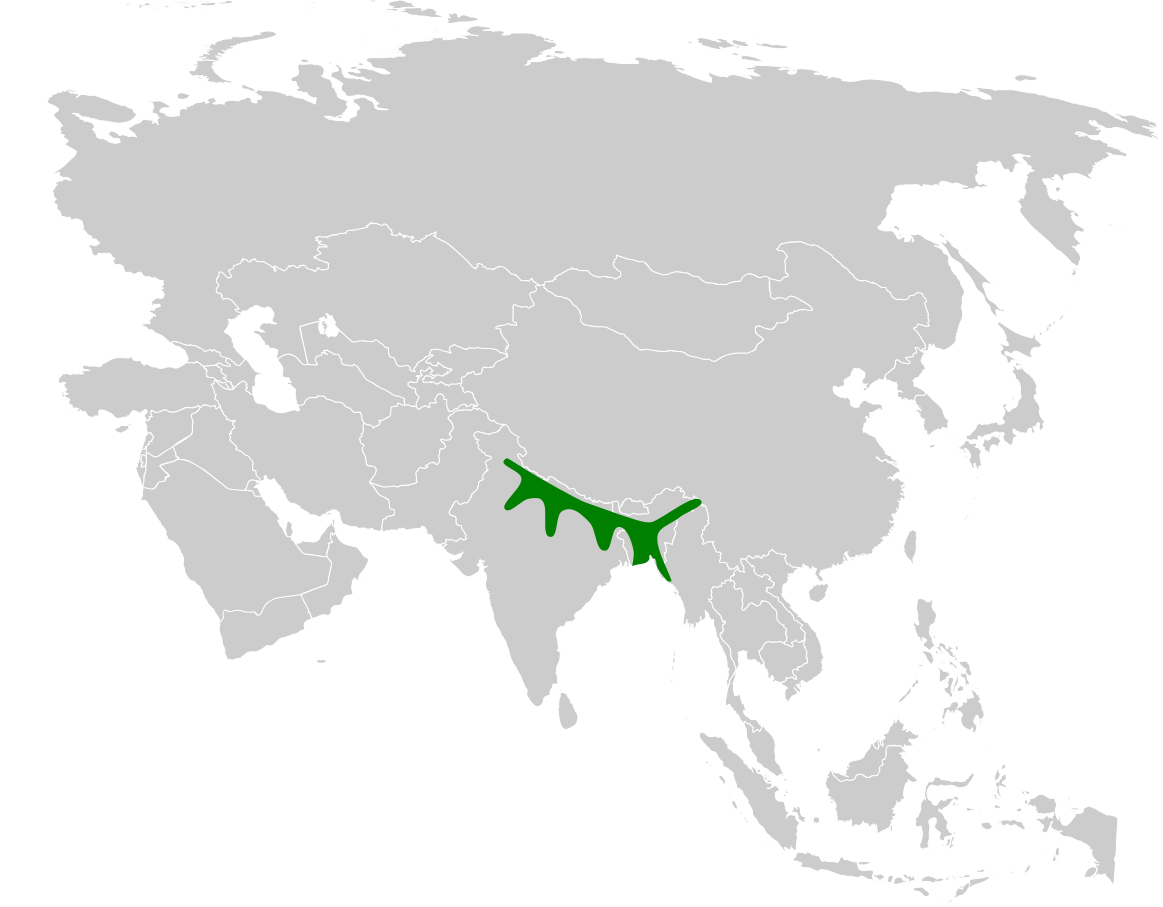

= Bengal bush lark =

Species of bird

The Bengal bush lark (Plocealauda assamica) or Bengal lark is a species of lark in the family Alaudidae found in Southern Asia.

== Taxonomy and systematics ==
The Bengal bush lark was formerly placed in the genus Mirafra. It is one of five species moved to a newly erected genus, Plocealauda, based on evidence from a large molecular genetic study published in 2023. The species is monotypic: no subspecies are recognised.

The Bengal bush lark was earlier classified into several races, the Bengal race assamica and the Madras race affinis. These were subsequently split, on the basis of diagnostic song and display characters, into the Jerdon's bush lark (Mirafra affinis) and assamica in the strict sense. Formerly, both the Burmese bush lark and Jerdon's bush lark were considered subspecies of the Bengal bush lark (as M. a. microptera and M. a. affinis respectively) until split to form a separate species. The alternate name "rufous-winged bush lark" may also be used to describe the red-winged lark. Another alternate name for the Bengal bush lark is the rufous-winged lark.

== Description ==
The Bengal bush lark is short-tailed and has a strong stout bill. It is not as long as the skylark, measuring about 15 centimetres in length. It is dark-streaked grey above, and buff below, with spotting on the breast and behind the eye. The wings are rufous.

The song is a repetition of thin disyllabic notes, delivered in a song-flight.

== Distribution and habitat ==
The Bengal bush lark is a resident breeder in the Indian subcontinent and south-east Asia, and found in the countries of Bangladesh, Bhutan, India, Myanmar and Nepal, with an estimated global extent of occurrence of 100,000-1,000,000 square kilometres.

It is a common bird of dry, open, stony country often with sparse shrubs, and cultivated areas.

== Behaviour and ecology ==
It nests on the ground, laying three or four speckled eggs. This lark feeds primarily on seeds and insects, especially the latter during the breeding season.

== Gallery ==
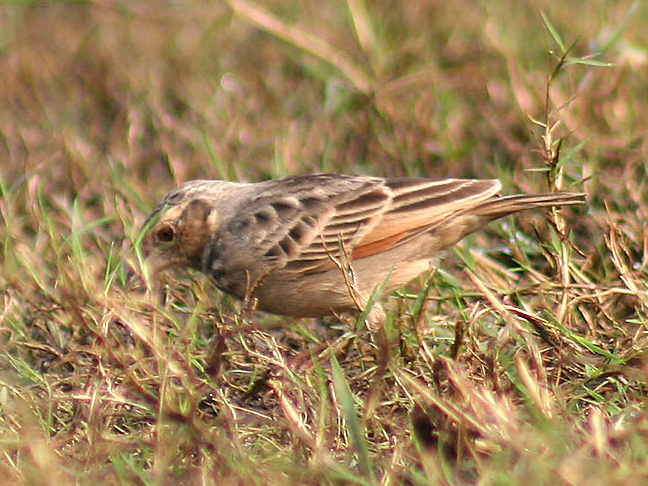
In Kolkata

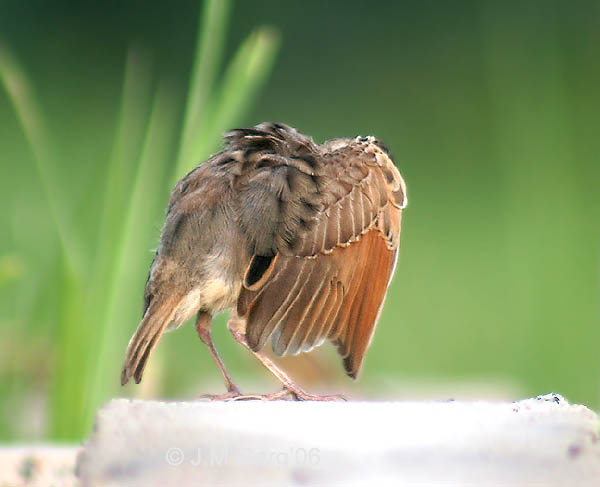
Showing wing colour while preening in Kolkata

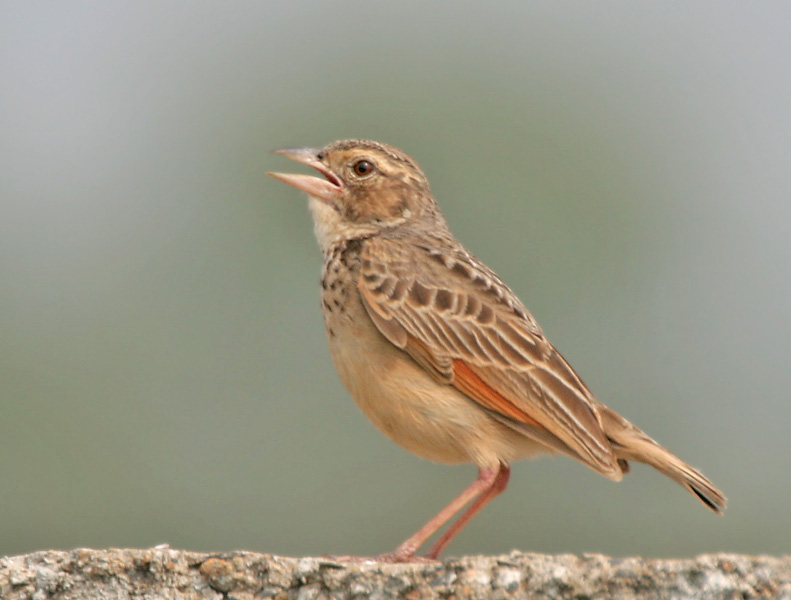
In Kolkata, West Bengal, India

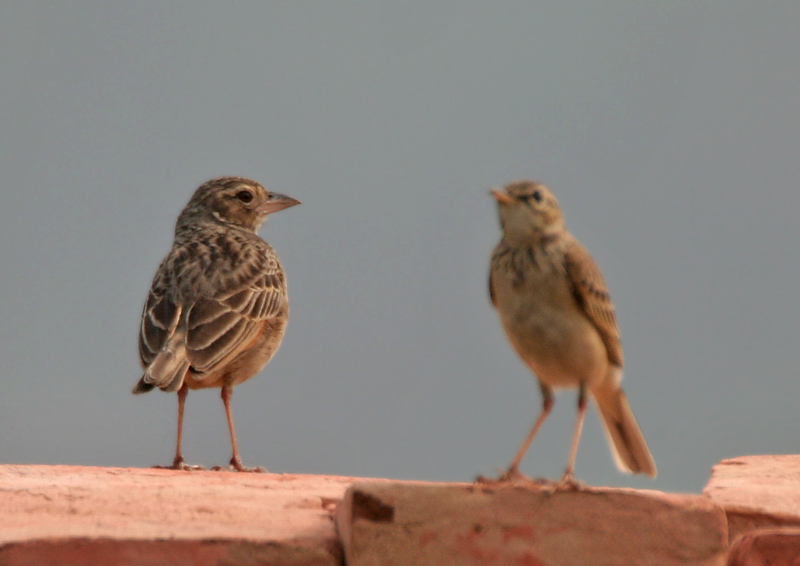
With paddyfield pipit (Anthus rufulus) in Kolkata, West Bengal, India

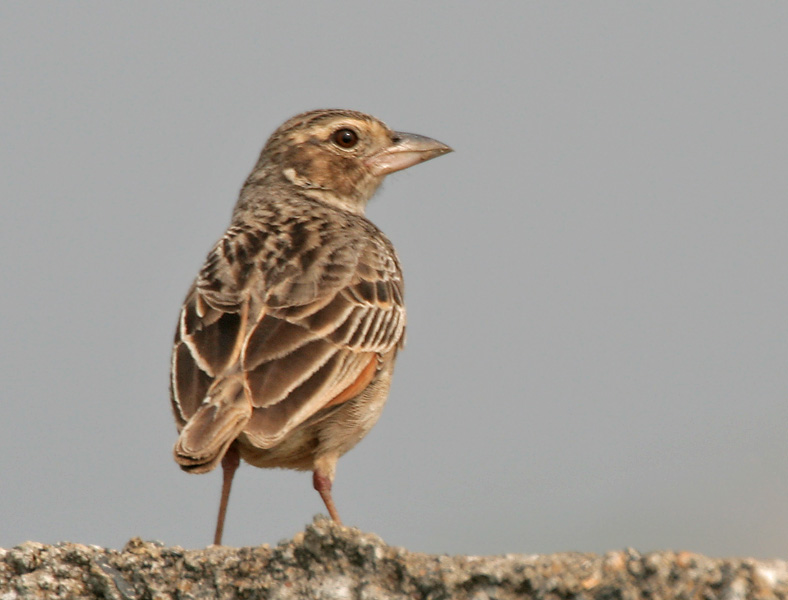
In Kolkata, West Bengal, India

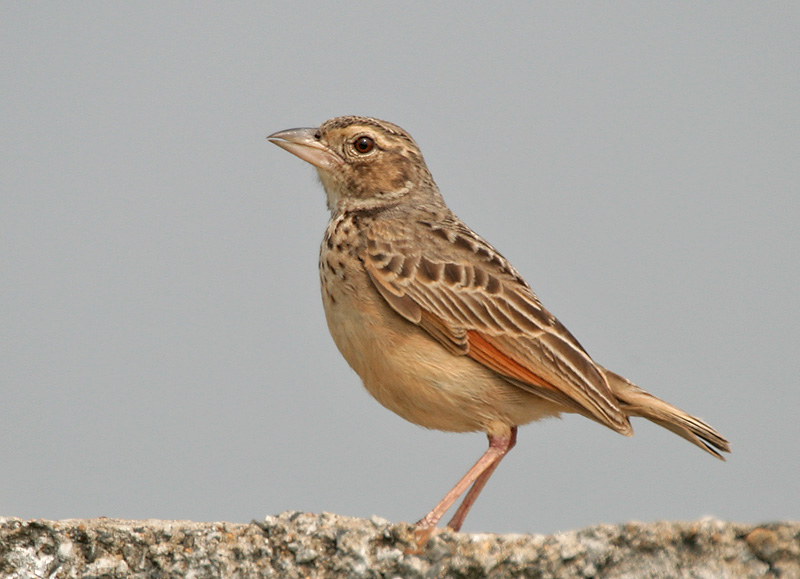
In Kolkata, West Bengal, India

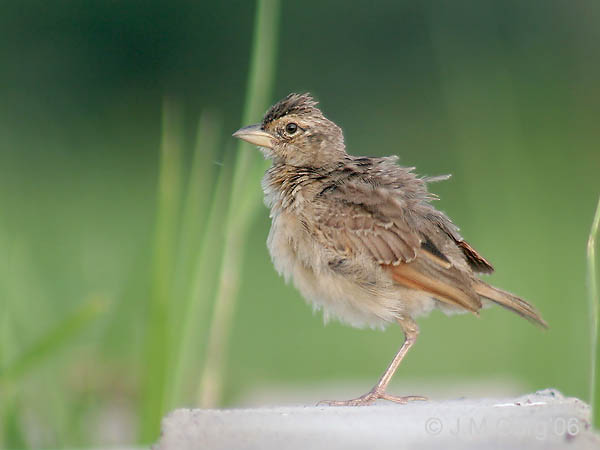
Preening in Kolkata, West Bengal, India

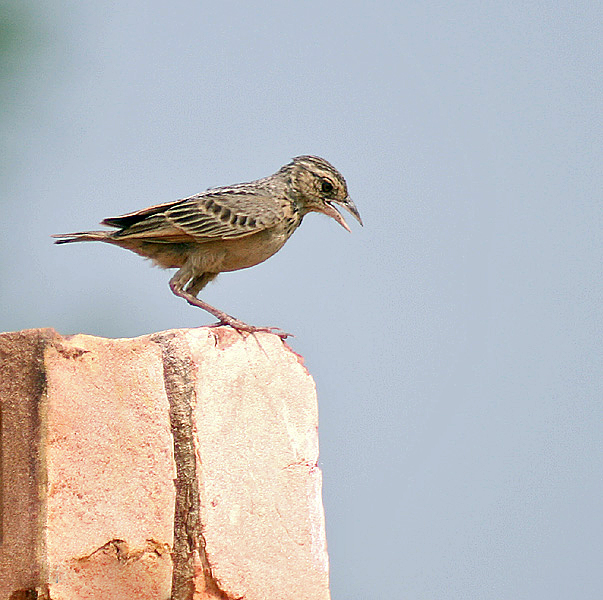
In Kolkata, West Bengal, India

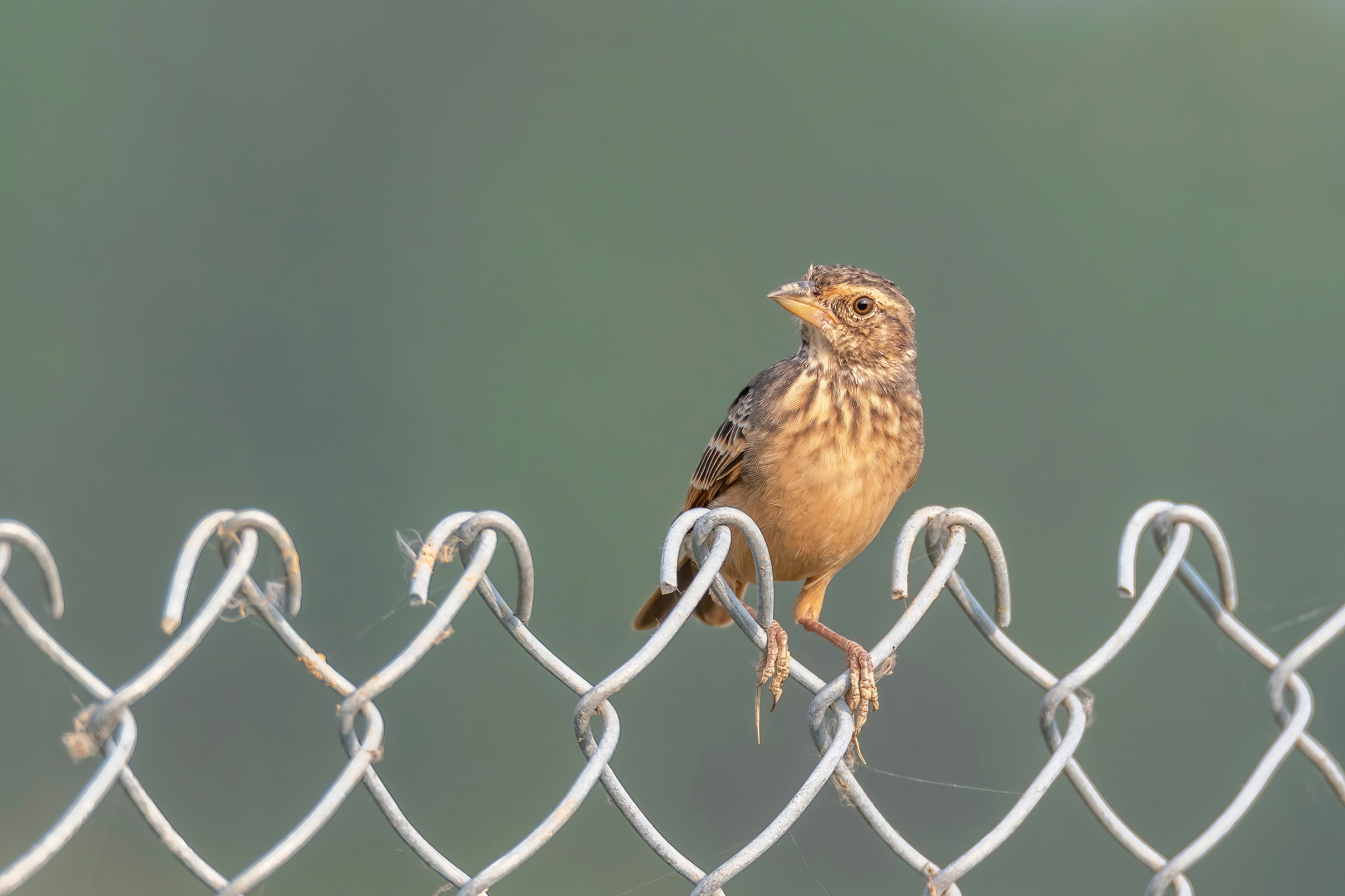
At Hetauda, Nepal

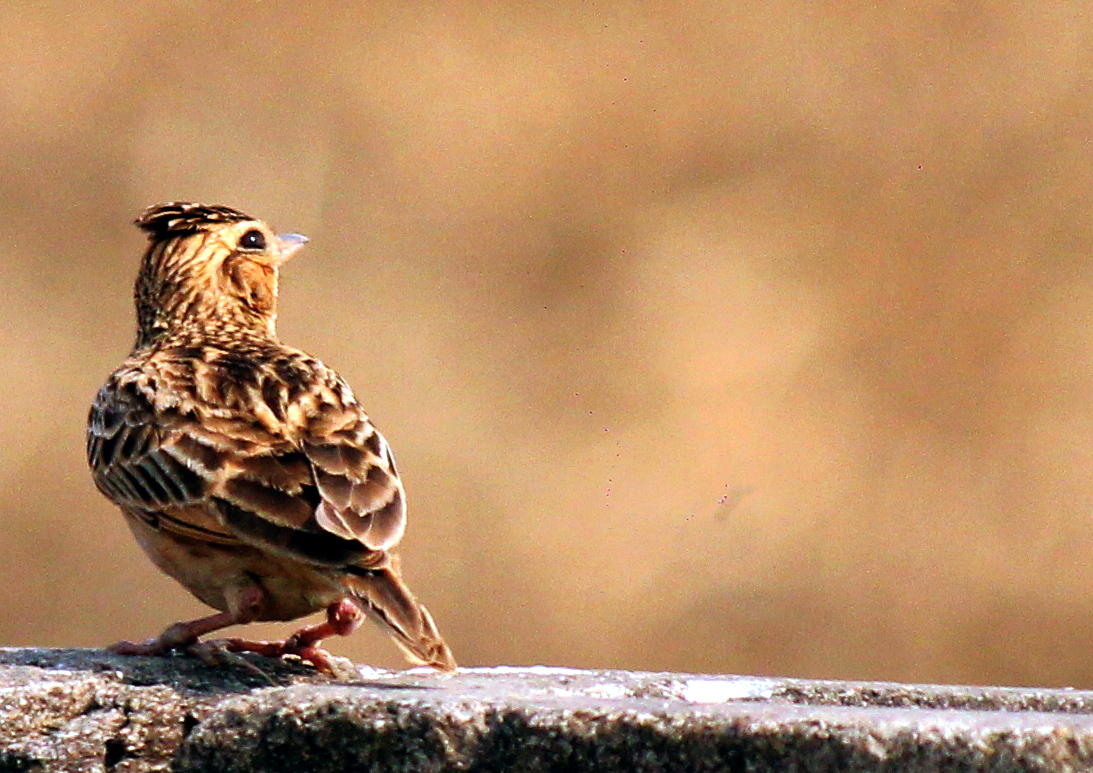
Bengal bush lark in Boshipota, West Bengal, India

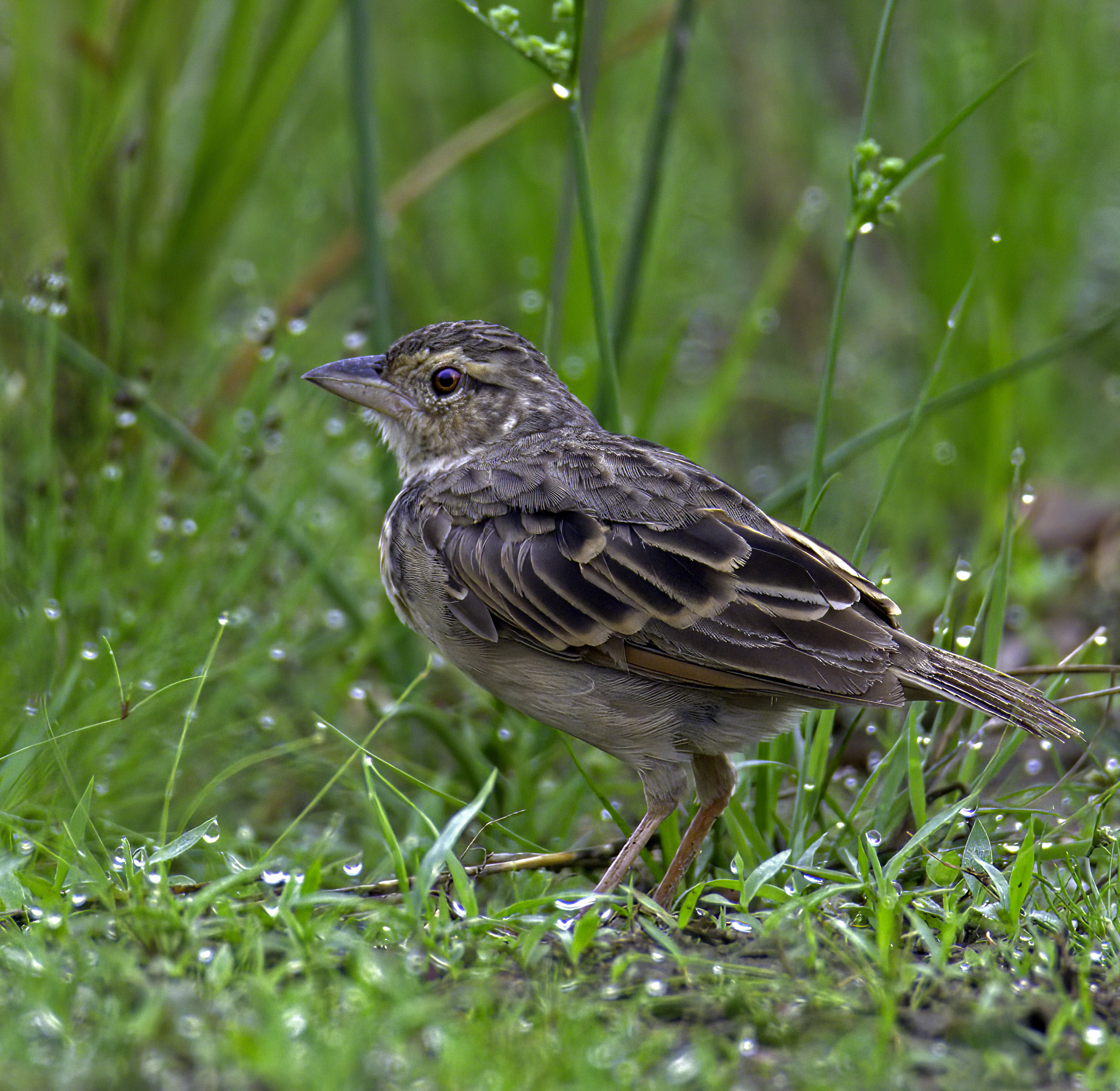
In Gazipur, Bangladesh
