= Hymenocephalus rigidus =

Scientific classification
- Kingdom: Plantae
- Clade: Tracheophytes
- Clade: Angiosperms
- Clade: Eudicots
- Clade: Asterids
- Order: Asterales
- Family: Asteraceae
- Genus: Hymenocephalus; Jaub. & Spach
- Species: H. rigidus

Binomial name
- Hymenocephalus rigidus Jaub. & Spach

Species of flowering plant

Hymenocephalus rigidus is a species of flowering plant in the daisy family, and is the sole member of its genus Hymenocephalus. This species is native to Iran.
