= Enrico Hillyer Giglioli =

Italian zoologist and anthropologist (1845–1909)

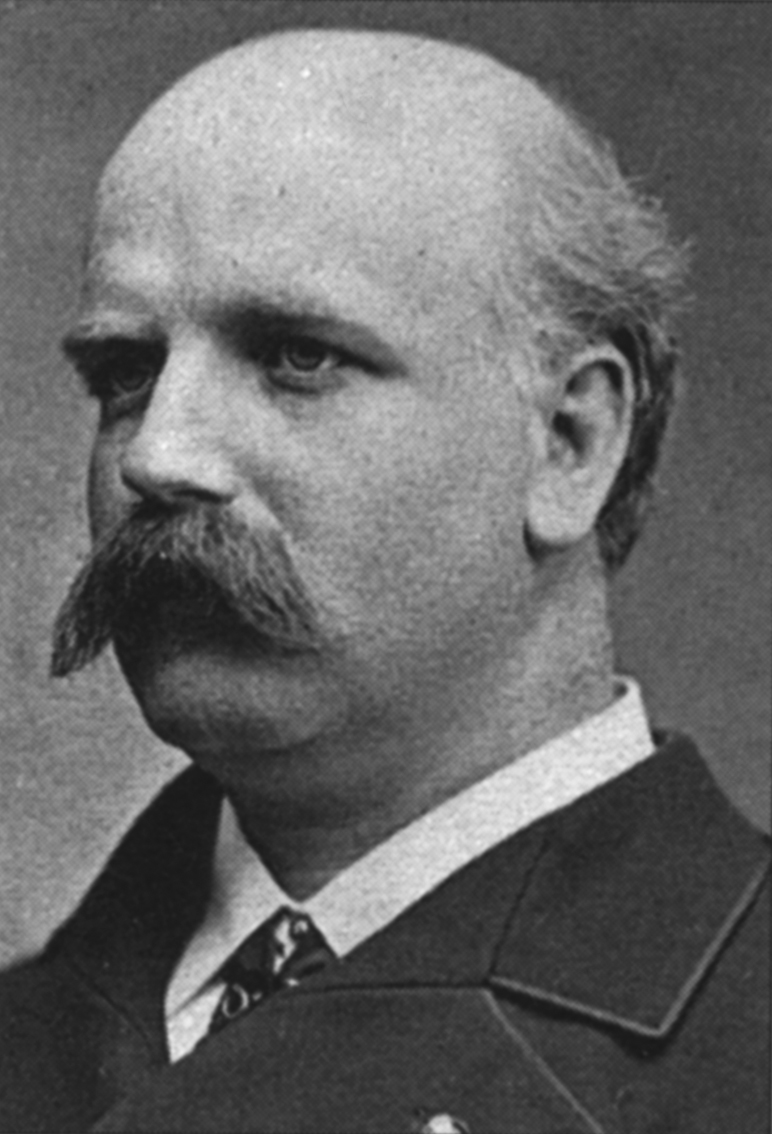
Enrico Hillyer Giglioli

Enrico Hillyer Giglioli (13 June 1845 – 16 December 1909) was an Italian zoologist and anthropologist.

Though Giglioli's studies began in his birth city of London, he ultimately obtained a degree in science at the University of Pisa in 1864 and began teaching vertebrate zoology in Florence in 1869. His academic focus was on marine life, but he was also a noted amateur ornithologist and prolific collector of photographs.

After having become acquainted with Filippo de Filippi, director of the Zoological Museum in Turin, Giglioli was asked to accompany de Filippi aboard the corvette Magenta, a warship of the Italian Royal Navy, where they conducted zoological research. In 1867, during the course of the voyage, de Filippi died in Hong Kong. In 1874, six years after the voyage concluded, Giglioli was appointed director of the Royal Zoological Museum of Florence. Giglioli was also involved in the activities of the Florence School of Anthropology, and developed an interest in ethnography. By 1901, he was elected a member of the American Philosophical Society.

== Whale sightings ==
In 1867, Giglioli reportedly observed a new species of whale (unofficially called Giglioli's Whale) at a distance of 1,200 miles (1,900 km) off the coast of Chile aboard the Magenta. He described the alleged animal as measuring 60 feet (18 m) in length and possessing (unusually) a second dorsal fin situated 6.5 feet (2 m) from the first. Morphological similarities between Giglioli's whale and the Rorqual have been suggested. In 1898 off the coast of Scotland, a whale with comparable phenotypic characteristics was likewise reported by the crew of the Lily. Giglioli's purported whale was provisionally named Amphiptera pacifica in 1870, and remains an unrecognized species of whale, having not been confirmed by a sufficient number of sightings to be officially acknowledged by the greater scientific community. The voyage of the Magenta, which was circumnavigatory, had been sponsored by the government of Italy.

Giglioli also reported the stranding of a Cuvier's beaked whale in the Mediterranean Sea, as well as orcas in the Mediterranean. He also notably touched upon past and then-recent fin whale strandings in his writings.

== Other work ==
Giglioli conducted a detailed study of chimpanzee skulls that his friend Georg August Schweinfurth collected in the region of today's South Sudan. He named the species Troglodytes schweinfurthii.

From the 1880s, Giglioli concentrated on his ethnographic collection, exchanging specimens with the Smithsonian Institution and fellow naturalists, notably Edward Pierson Ramsay. After his death, Giglioli's collection, together with his extensive archaeological and ethnological library, went to the Pigorini National Museum of Prehistory and Ethnography, where they are now conserved. The photographic archive includes work by John K. Hillers, Timothy H. O'Sullivan, and Charles Milton Bell, as well as his own.

== Works ==
The following represents a partial list of Giglioli's written works:

- I Tasmaniani. Cenni storici ed etnologici di un popolo estinto. Illustrated with 15 Original Albumen Photographs (the last of the aborigines). Milano: F. Treves.
- Elenco dei Mammiferi, degli Uccelli e dei Rettili ittiofagi appartenenti alla Fauna italiana, e Catalogo degli Anfibie dei Pesci italiani in Catalogo Sezione italiana. Esposizione intern. di Pesca, Berlino, 1880 (11): 63–117. (also sep., Firenze, 1880: pp. 18–55). 1880.
- Primo resoconto dei risultati della inchiesta ornitologica in Italia Comp. dal dottore Enrico Hillyer Giglioli Firenze. Coi tipi dei successori Le Monnier 1889–1891. and (secondo)
- with Odoardo Beccari (1843–1920) and Francis Henry Hill Guillemard (1852–1933), Wanderings in the great forests of Borneo; travels and researches of a naturalist in Sarawak London: A. Constable & Co., Ltd.
- Giglioli, E.H. 1882. New and very rare fish from the Mediterranean. Nature 25: 535.
- Giglioli, E.H. 1882. New Deep-sea Fish from the Mediterranean. Nature, London 27 : 198–199.
- Intorno a due nuovi pesci dal golfo di Napoli. Zool. Anz 6 (144). 397–400.
- With A. Issel Esplorazione talassografica del Mediterraneo esguita sotto gli auspici del Governo italia no: 199–291, 5 fig. n.n., I map. 1884.
- Note intorno agli animali vertebrati raccolti dal Conte Augusto Boutourline e dal D. Leopoldo Traversi ad Assab e nello Scioa negli anni 1884-87. Annali Mus. civ. Stor. nat. Genova (2) 6: 5-73. 1888.
- On a supposed new genus and species of pelagic gadoid fishes from the Mediterranean. Proc. Zool. Soc. London (Pt. 3): 328–332. 1889.
- Apunti intorno ad una Collezione Etnografica fatta durante il terzo viaggio di Cook e conservata sin dalla fine del secolo scorso nel R. Museo di Fisica e Storia Naturale di Firenze. Firenze. 1893–95.

== See also ==
- Category:Taxa named by Enrico Hillyer Giglioli
- Bathophilus – Genus of fishes
- Eastern chimpanzee – Subspecies of ape
- Glasshead grenadier – Species of fish
- Indochinese green magpie – Species of bird
- Mediterranean grenadier – Species of fish
- Reithrodontomys – Genus of rodents
- Trindade petrel – Species of bird
- Voyages of scientific exploration (European and American)

== Bibliography ==
- Fedora Giordano, 1990 Italy's Contribution to Native American Studies European Review of Native American Studies 4:2
- Maurice Boubier (1925). L’Évolution de l’ornithologie. Librairie Félix Alcan (Paris), coll. Nouvelle collection scientifique : ii + 308 p.
- Barbara Mearns & Richard Mearns (1998). The Bird Collectors. Academic Press (Londres) : xvii + 472 p.
