= Dark freckled catshark =

Scyliorhinus ugoi

Scientific classification
- Kingdom: Animalia
- Phylum: Chordata
- Class: Chondrichthyes
- Subclass: Elasmobranchii
- Division: Selachii
- Order: Carcharhiniformes
- Family: Scyliorhinidae
- Genus: Scyliorhinus
- Species: S. ugoi

Binomial name
- Scyliorhinus ugoi K. D. A. Soares, Gadig & U. L. Gomes, 2015

Species of shark

The dark freckled catshark (Scyliorhinus ugoi) is a catshark of the family Scyliorhinidae. It is found in Northeastern and Southeastern Brazil. This species differs from Scyliorhinus besnardi, Scyliorhinus haeckelii group and Scyliorhinus hesperius, in background coloration, head width, sexual maturity, and in cranial and body proportions.
