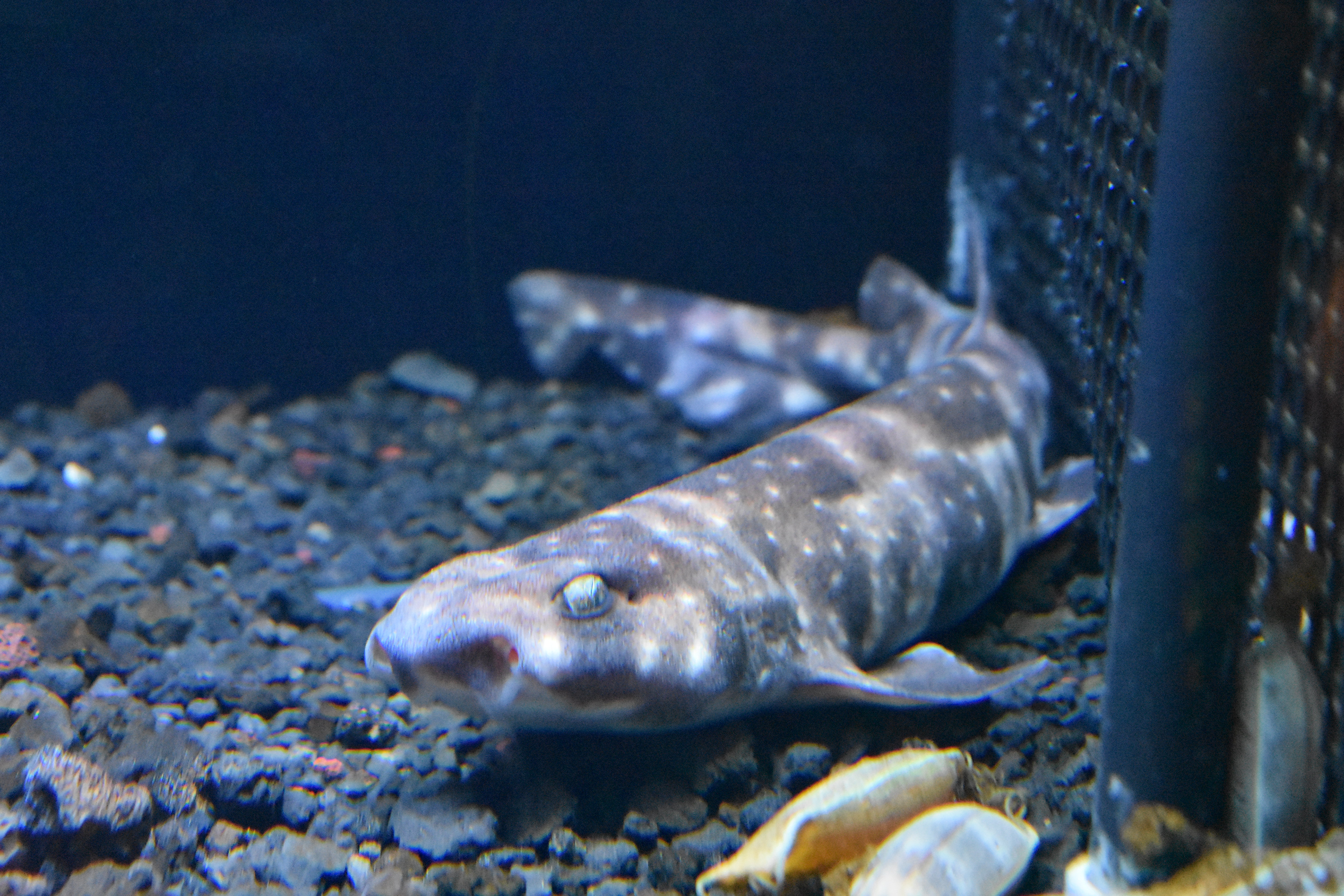

Scientific classification
- Kingdom: Animalia
- Phylum: Chordata
- Class: Chondrichthyes
- Subclass: Elasmobranchii
- Division: Selachii
- Order: Carcharhiniformes
- Family: Scyliorhinidae
- Genus: Scyliorhinus
- Species: S. hachijoensis

Binomial name
- Scyliorhinus hachijoensis Ito, Fuji, Nohara, and Tanaka, 2022

= Cinder cloudy catshark =

Species of shark

The cinder cloudy catshark (Scyliorhinus hachijoensis) is a species of catshark from the Pacific Ocean; all specimens identified have been from the area around the Izu Islands, Japan. The species is a close relative of the cloudy catshark (S. torazame), and the overall appearance is similar. The species was first identified in 2022 as bycatch of the splendid alfonsino fishery.

The cinder cloudy catshark is genetically similar to the cloudy catshark, but can be differentiated based on the coloration pattern from all other species within the genus. The term "cinder" refers to Cinderella, specifically the flecks of grey in the coloration pattern which are reminiscent of cinders. The species has the same specialized hooks in its clasper morphology which distinguishes the cinder cloudy catshark and cloudy catshark from the rest of the genus.

The Latin name comes from Hachijō-jima, an island near where many of the specimens were collected.

== Physical description ==
The cinder cloudy catshark is brown with both lighter and darker grey spots, with an overall maximum length of approximately 40 cm.

== Distribution ==
All specimens identified have been caught around the Izu Islands, off the coast of Japan, caught by longline at depths ranging from 100 m to 650 m. This is notably deeper than the cloudy catshark.

== Reproduction ==
Like many other sharks, this species is ovoviviparous with an egg case of 5 cm not including tendrils. Unlike others in the genus which appear smooth, the surface of the egg case typically appears wrinkled.
