= Dwarf catshark =

Conservation status
- Least Concern (IUCN 3.1)

Scientific classification
- Kingdom: Animalia
- Phylum: Chordata
- Class: Chondrichthyes
- Subclass: Elasmobranchii
- Division: Selachii
- Order: Carcharhiniformes
- Family: Scyliorhinidae
- Genus: Scyliorhinus
- Species: S. torrei

Binomial name
- Scyliorhinus torrei Howell-Rivero, 1936
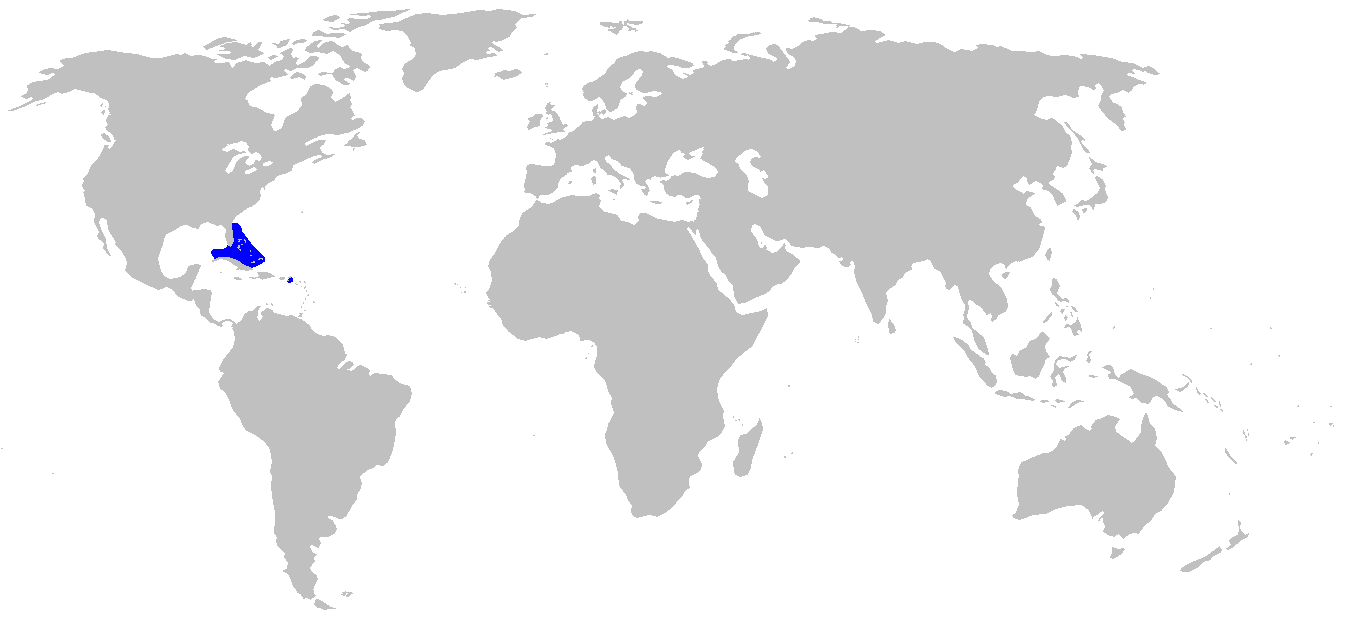

Species of shark

The dwarf catshark (Scyliorhinus torrei) is a catshark, belonging to the family Scyliorhinidae. It is found off the coast of southern Florida, the Bahamas, and Cuba and is also known as the whitespotted catshark and Cuban catshark.

== Description ==
The dwarf catshark is a small, slender but deep-bodied catshark with a maximum length of about 32 cm (13 in). The front nasal flaps are small and do not extend as far as the mouth; there are grooves on the lower lip and there are no nasoral grooves. The first dorsal fin is considerably larger than the second fin and is positioned above or slightly behind the pelvic fin insertion. The distance between the two dorsal fins is greater than the length of the base of the anal fin. The basic colour of the back and sides is pale brown and on this are an evenly distributed scattering of large white spots and seven or eight indistinct dark saddles. This species does not have any black spots.

== Ecology ==
This deepwater catshark is known from the subtropical western Atlantic Ocean, it being found off the coasts of southern Florida, the Bahamas and Cuba at depths of between 200 and 600 m (700 and 2,000 ft), but most commonly between 366 and 550 m (1,200 and 1,800 ft); it inhabits the continental shelf and insular slopes and has been little studied. It is oviparous, laying a pair of eggs at a time. As the embryos develop inside their egg-cases, they feed on their egg yolks.

== Status ==
This little-known catshark has a rather limited range and is occasionally caught by deepwater trawlers working near the seabed. It seems to be an uncommon species, but as it is seldom caught, the population is probably stable and the International Union for Conservation of Nature has assessed the fish's conservation status as being of "least concern".
