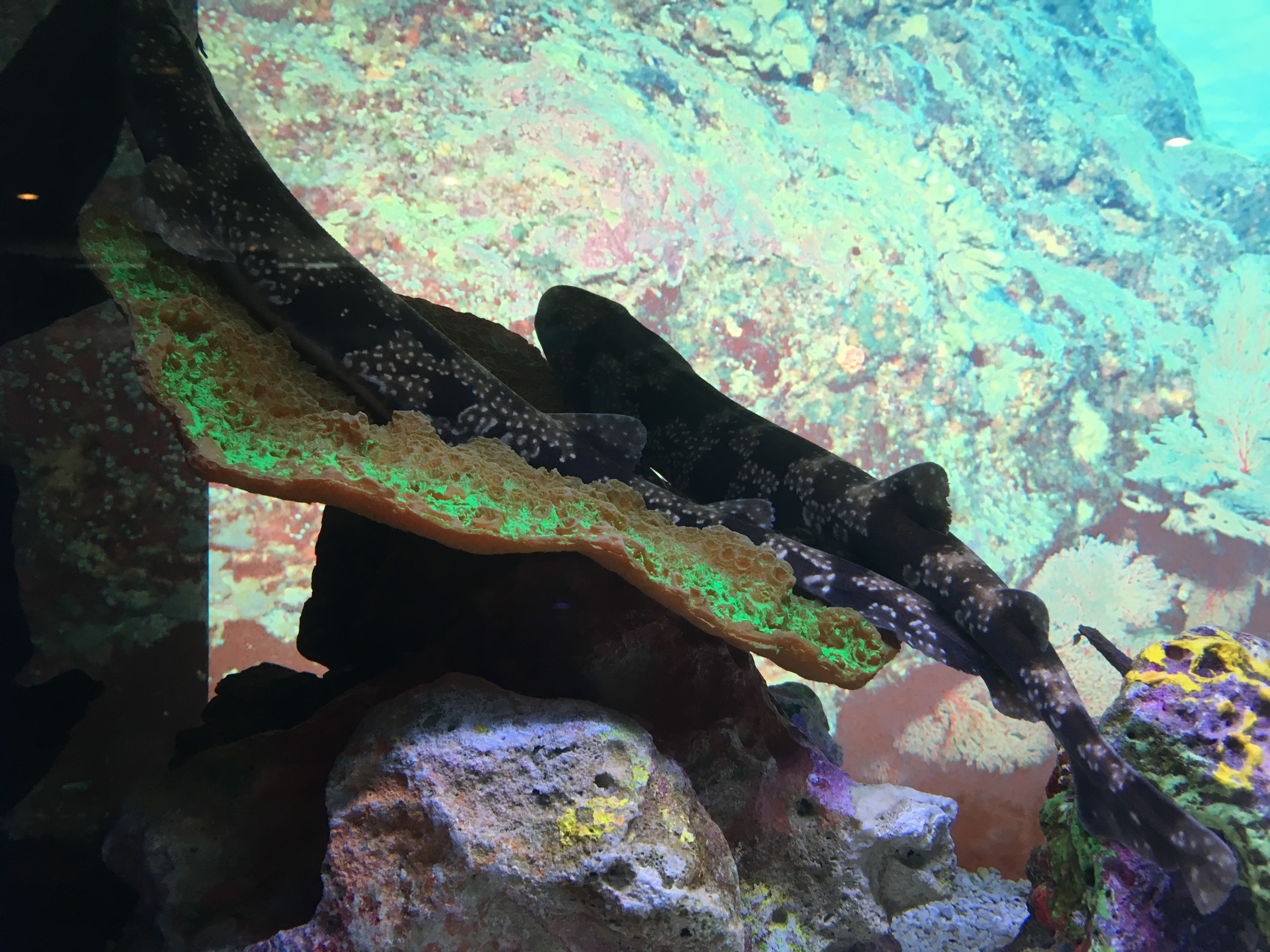

Conservation status
- Data Deficient (IUCN 3.1)

Scientific classification
- Kingdom: Animalia
- Phylum: Chordata
- Class: Chondrichthyes
- Subclass: Elasmobranchii
- Division: Selachii
- Order: Carcharhiniformes
- Family: Scyliorhinidae
- Genus: Scyliorhinus
- Species: S. tokubee

Binomial name
- Scyliorhinus tokubee Shirai, S. Hagiwara & Nakaya, 1992
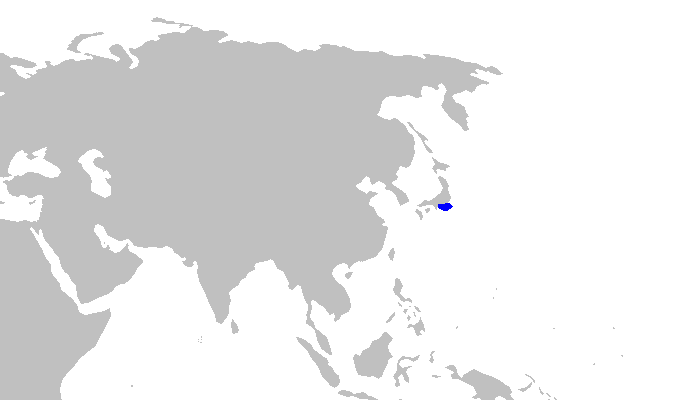
- Range of the Izu catshark

= Izu catshark =

Species of shark

The Izu catshark (Scyliorhinus tokubee) is a species of catshark, family Scyliorhinidae, found only in the waters around Japan, at depths down to 100 m (328 ft). It can grow up to a length of 41 cm (16.1 in).
