= Scyliorhinus cabofriensis =

Scientific classification
- Kingdom: Animalia
- Phylum: Chordata
- Class: Chondrichthyes
- Subclass: Elasmobranchii
- Division: Selachii
- Order: Carcharhiniformes
- Family: Scyliorhinidae
- Genus: Scyliorhinus
- Species: S. cabofriensis

Binomial name
- Scyliorhinus cabofriensis K. D. A. Soares, U. L. Gomes & M. R. de Carvalho, 2016

Species of shark

Scyliorhinus cabofriensis is a species of catshark of the family Scyliorhinidae. It is found in Cabo Frio, Rio de Janeiro southeastern Brazil. This species is distinguished from all southwestern Atlantic congeners by its color pattern, clasper and neurocranial morphology and proportional measurements.
