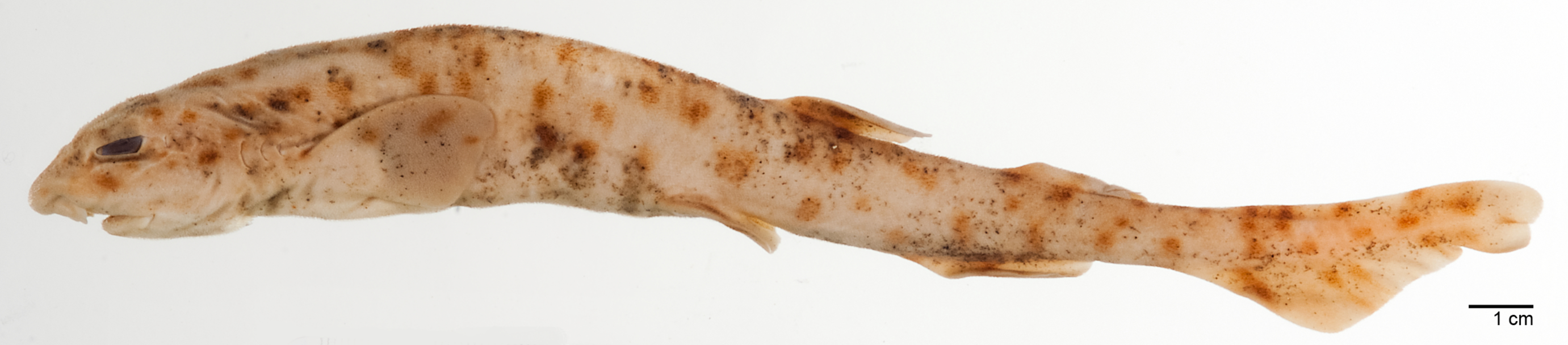

Conservation status
- Data Deficient (IUCN 3.1)

Scientific classification
- Kingdom: Animalia
- Phylum: Chordata
- Class: Chondrichthyes
- Subclass: Elasmobranchii
- Division: Selachii
- Order: Carcharhiniformes
- Family: Scyliorhinidae
- Genus: Scyliorhinus
- Species: S. garmani

Binomial name
- Scyliorhinus garmani (Fowler, 1934)
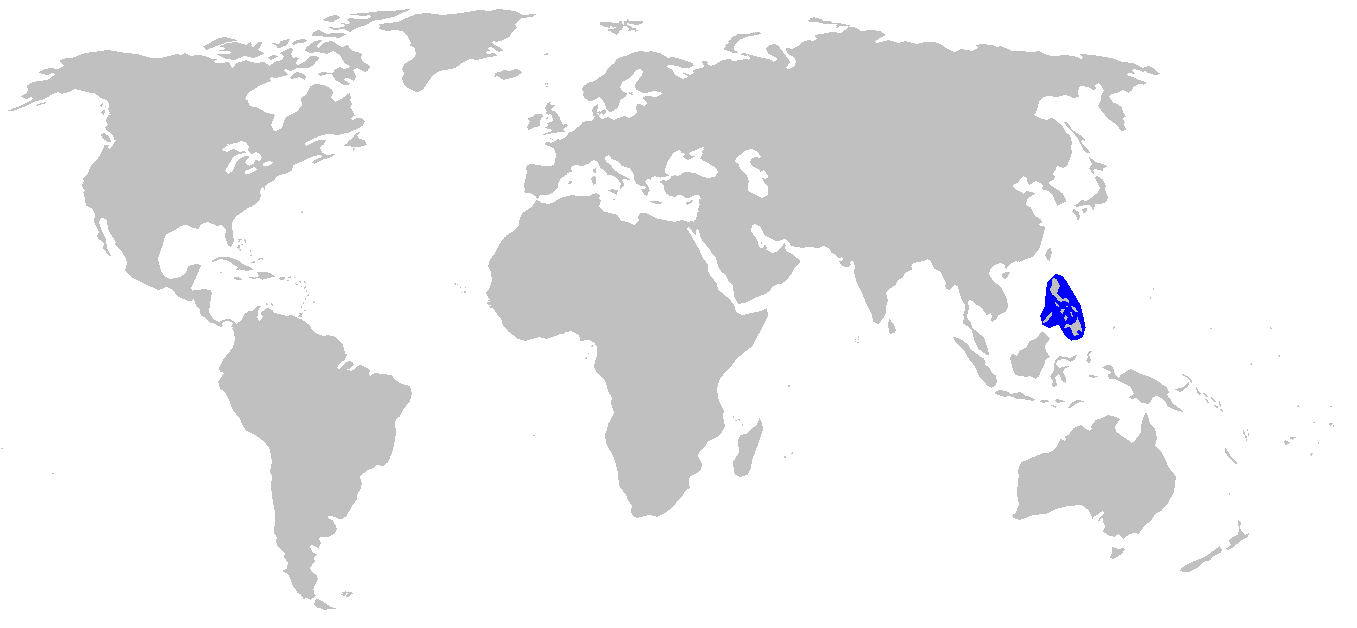

= Brownspotted catshark =

Species of shark

The brownspotted catshark (Scyliorhinus garmani) is a rare catshark of the family Scyliorhinidae, found in the Indo-West Pacific between latitudes 11° N and 12° S. Its juvenile length is about 38 cm, but its adult size is mostly unknown. The reproduction of this catshark is oviparous.

== Naming ==
The specific name garmani was dedicated to Samuel Walton Garman (1843–1927), renowned herpetologist and ichthyologist of the Museum of Comparative Zoology of Harvard University.
