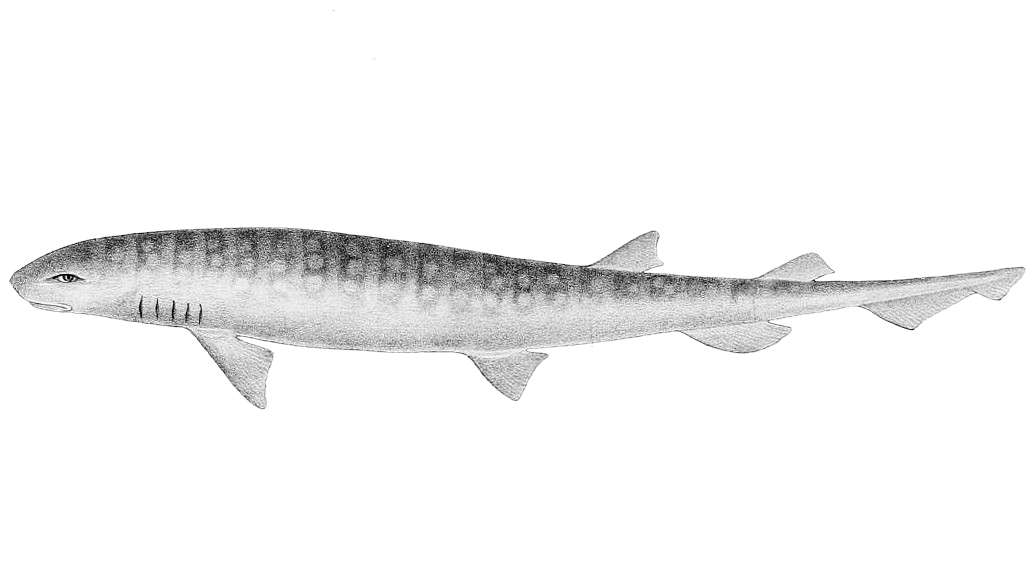

Conservation status
- Near Threatened (IUCN 3.1)

Scientific classification
- Kingdom: Animalia
- Phylum: Chordata
- Class: Chondrichthyes
- Subclass: Elasmobranchii
- Division: Selachii
- Order: Carcharhiniformes
- Family: Scyliorhinidae
- Genus: Scyliorhinus
- Species: S. capensis

Binomial name
- Scyliorhinus capensis (J. P. Müller & Henle, 1838)
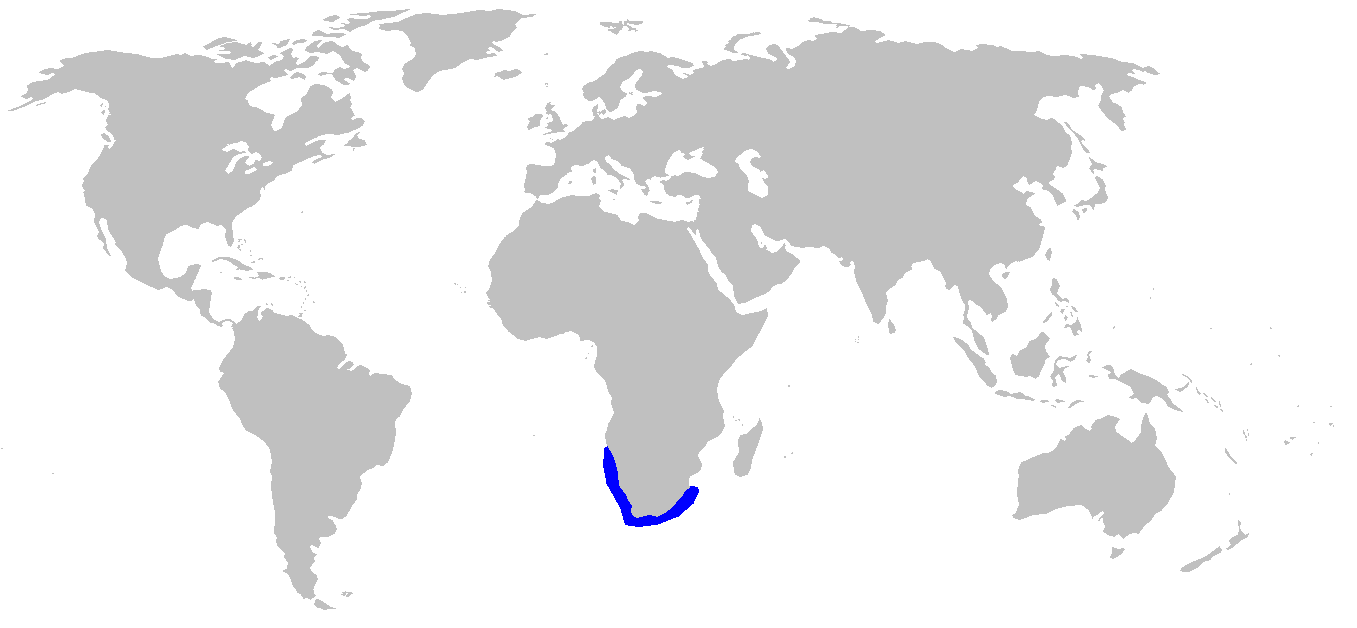

= Yellowspotted catshark =

Species of shark

The yellowspotted catshark (Scyliorhinus capensis) is a rare catshark of the family Scyliorhinidae. It is found in the southeast Atlantic, from Lüderitz, Namibia to central Natal, South Africa, between latitudes 0° and 37° S. It can grow up to a length of about 1.22 metres (4 ft 0 in). The reproduction of this catshark is oviparous.

== Description ==
The yellowspotted catshark is a long slender fish with rough skin. The upperparts are light grey, copiously spotted with small golden-yellow spots. There are eight or nine dark patches on the back which bridge the spine. The underside is cream-coloured. Small flaps cover the nostrils but do not extend as far as the mouth and there are no nasoral grooves. There are two triangular dorsal fins, the front one considerably larger than the rear one.

== Distribution and habitat ==
The yellowspotted catshark is found in the seas around the coast of southern Africa at depths down to about 500 metres (1,600 ft). Its range extends from Lüderitz in Namibia to central Natal. Although fairly common off the coast of South Africa it occurs less frequently and in deeper waters in the more tropical parts of its range in Namibia and Natal. Although seen over sandy bottoms, it also frequents rocky reefs.

== Biology ==
The yellowspotted catshark feeds on small fish, crustaceans and squid. It is an egg-laying species, laying a single egg at a time, and enclosing it in an egg case roughly 8 by 3 centimetres (3.1 in × 1.2 in). The juvenile fish when they hatch may measure about 25 cm (10 in) and the adults can grow to 1.22 metres (4 ft 0 in) but most individuals are under a metre (3 ft) long. This shark is more common on rocky reefs than on sandy seabeds.

== Status ==
The IUCN, in its Red List of Threatened Species lists the yellowspotted catshark as being "Near Threatened". In the offshore waters where it lives there is a large hake fishery and the yellowspotted catshark is caught and discarded as bycatch during trawling. The rate of reproduction is probably failing to keep up with the depletion of the adult population by this means thus threatening the species' future.
