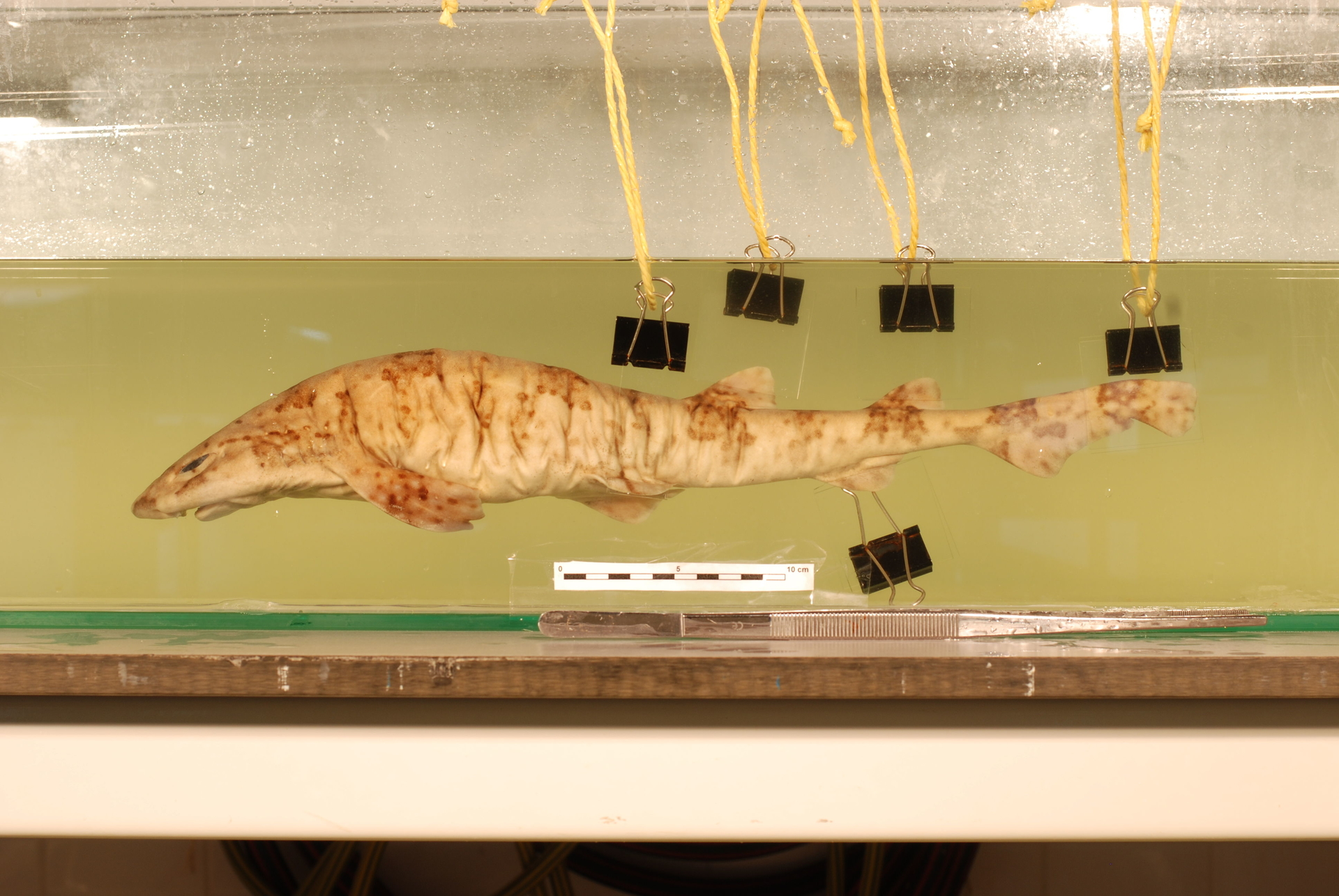

Conservation status
- Least Concern (IUCN 3.1)

Scientific classification
- Kingdom: Animalia
- Phylum: Chordata
- Class: Chondrichthyes
- Subclass: Elasmobranchii
- Division: Selachii
- Order: Carcharhiniformes
- Family: Scyliorhinidae
- Genus: Scyliorhinus
- Species: S. boa

Binomial name
- Scyliorhinus boa Goode & T. H. Bean, 1896
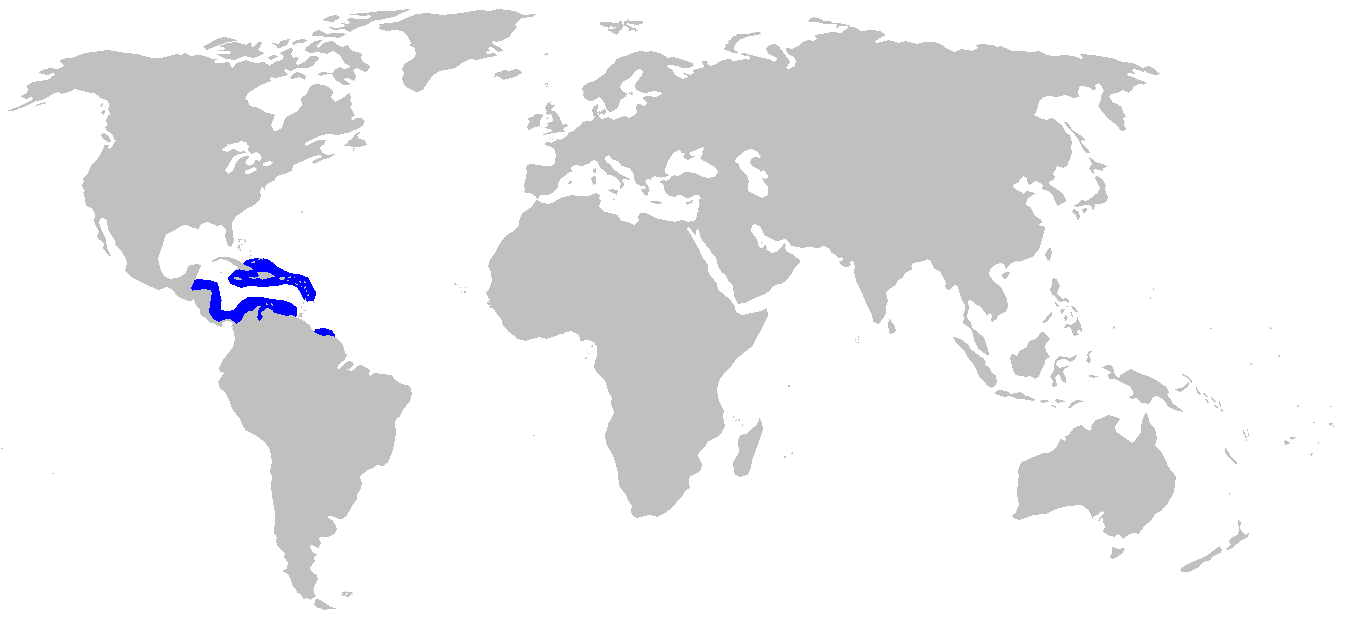

= Boa catshark =

Species of shark

The boa catshark (Scyliorhinus boa) is a catshark of the family Scyliorhinidae. It is found on the continental shelves and insular slopes of the Caribbean Sea and the Gulf of Mexico, between latitudes 20° N and 9° N, at depths between 330 and 675 m. It can grow up to a length of 54 cm. The reproduction of this catshark is oviparous.

== Description ==
The boa catshark is a fairly small, slender but deep-bodied species that can grow to a length of about 54 cm (21 in). The front nasal flaps do not extend as far as the mouth, which has grooves on the lower lip only, and there are no nasoral grooves. The first dorsal fin has its origin just behind the rear end of the pelvic fin; there is a wide gap between it and the second dorsal fin, which is much smaller and has its origin above the posterior part of the pelvic fin. The skin is only slightly rough and the placoid scales are small. The background colour of the dorsal surface and flanks is pale yellowish-brown. The markings consist of a number of rather indistinct rectangular grey patches and saddles which are outlined with small black spots. Other black spots sometimes form net-like rows but these are seldom superimposed on the grey patches. There is sometimes a scattering of white spots also.

== Distribution ==
The boa catshark is native to the tropical western Atlantic Ocean and the Caribbean Sea; it is found near the seabed on the continental shelves and insular slopes of the region between about 20°N and 9°N. It is a deepwater species, occurring at depths between about 329 and 676 m (1,080 and 2,220 ft).

== Ecology ==
This catshark has been little studied. It is oviparous, laying a pair of eggs, with the embryos feeding on the yolk as they develop.

== Status ==
As a deepwater species, the boa catshark lives below the depths at which commercial trawling takes place in the Caribbean region. The fish does not seem to face any particular threats and the International Union for Conservation of Nature has assessed its conservation status as being of "least concern".
