= West African catshark =

Conservation status
- Data Deficient (IUCN 3.1)

Scientific classification
- Kingdom: Animalia
- Phylum: Chordata
- Class: Chondrichthyes
- Subclass: Elasmobranchii
- Division: Selachii
- Order: Carcharhiniformes
- Family: Scyliorhinidae
- Genus: Scyliorhinus
- Species: S. cervigoni

Binomial name
- Scyliorhinus cervigoni Maurin & Bonnet, 1970
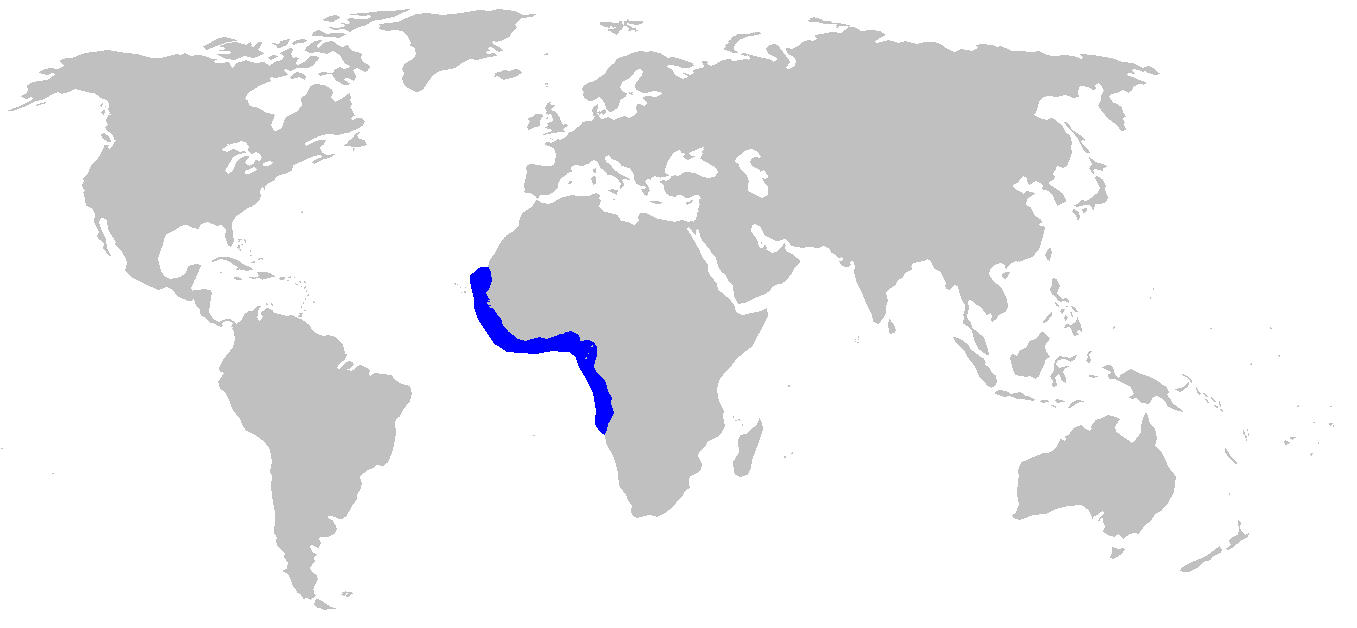

Species of shark

The West African catshark (Scyliorhinus cervigoni) is a catshark of the family Scyliorhinidae. It is found in the eastern Atlantic between latitudes 20° N and 17° S, at depths between 45 and 500 m. It can grow up to a length of 80 centimetres (31 in). At one time, the West African catshark was considered to be a subspecies of the nursehound, Scyliorhinus stellaris, but is now considered to be a separate species. The reproduction of this catshark is oviparous.

== Etymology ==
The shark is named for Fernando Cervigón Marcos.

== Description ==
The West African catshark has a stout body and a somewhat flattened head, the greatest width of which is at least two thirds of its length. It has no nasoral grooves, the flap that covers the nostrils extends just as far as the mouth and there are labial furrows on the lower jaws only. The front edge of the anterior dorsal fin is immediately above the posterior end of the pelvic fin. The gap separating the two dorsal fins is about the same length as the base of the anal fin. The posterior dorsal fin is much smaller than the anterior one and its leading edge is above the rear part of the anal fin. The caudal fin is broad with a square-cut end and a medium-sized lower lobe. The skin is rough due to a covering of large, erect dermal denticles. The West African catshark can grow to about 80 centimetres (31 in). The background colour is greyish or brownish with distinct large black spots on the back and sides and eight or nine dark-coloured, saddle-shaped patches, the extremities of which often centre on the black spots. There are no white spots or patches as are sometimes found in the rather similar nursehound (Scyliorhinus stellaris).

== Distribution and habitat ==
The West African catshark is found in the eastern Atlantic Ocean at depths between 45 and 500 metres (148 and 1,640 ft). Its range extends from Mauritania in West Africa to Angola. It is a bottom-dwelling species inhabiting the continental shelf on muddy and rocky seabeds.

== Biology ==
The West African catshark feeds on fish. This shark has been little studied but is thought to be an egg-laying species as egg cases measuring about 8 by 3 centimetres (3.1 in × 1.2 in) have been found that are believed to belong to it. The IUCN in its Red List of Threatened Species lists it as being "Data Deficient" as its population trend is unknown, but considers it likely that some individuals are caught as bycatch by trawlers.
