= Scyliorhinus muelleri =

Scyliorhinus muelleri Temporal range: Turonian

Scientific classification
- Kingdom: Animalia
- Phylum: Chordata
- Class: Chondrichthyes
- Subclass: Elasmobranchii
- Division: Selachii
- Order: Carcharhiniformes
- Family: Scyliorhinidae
- Genus: Scyliorhinus
- Species: †S. muelleri

Binomial name
- †Scyliorhinus muelleri Guinot et al., 2013

Extinct species of fish

Scyliorhinus muelleri is an extinct species of Scyliorhinus that lived during the middle of the Turonian stage of the Late Cretaceous epoch.

== Distribution ==
Scyliorhinus muelleri is known from fossils found in France.
