= Scyliorhinus monsaugustus =

Scyliorhinus monsaugustus Temporal range: Campanian

Scientific classification
- Kingdom: Animalia
- Phylum: Chordata
- Class: Chondrichthyes
- Subclass: Elasmobranchii
- Division: Selachii
- Order: Carcharhiniformes
- Family: Scyliorhinidae
- Genus: Scyliorhinus
- Species: †S. monsaugustus

Binomial name
- †Scyliorhinus monsaugustus Guinot et al., 2013

Extinct species of shark

Scyliorhinus monsaugustus is an extinct species of Scyliorhinus that lived during the Campanian stage of the Late Cretaceous epoch.

== Distribution ==
Scyliorhinus monsaugustus is known from fossils found in France.
