= Rock salmon =

British shark dish

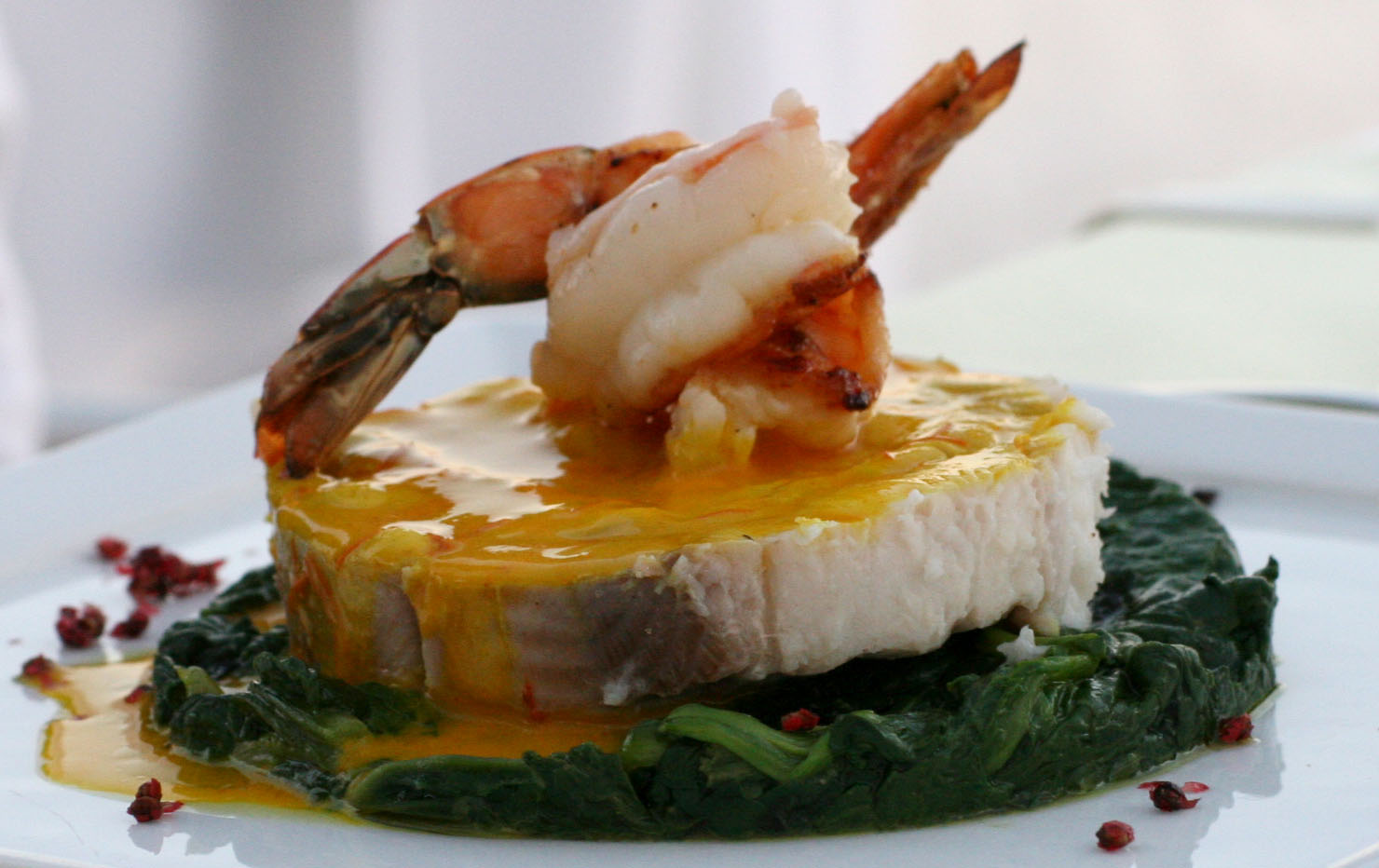
A Greek restaurant dish of "rock salmon" with shrimp and saffron sauce on a bed of spinach.

Rock salmon, also called rock eel, flake, huss or Sweet William, is a variety of fish as food, usually served in Britain as part of a fish and chips dish.

The term can describe many species of small shark, including the spiny dogfish (Squalus acanthias), starry smooth-hound (Mustelus asterias), rough-hound (Scyliorhinus canicula) and bull huss (Scyliorhinus stellaris).

Rock salmon is consumed in many European countries. However, the spiny dogfish is now an endangered species due to overfishing and is classed as Vulnerable on the IUCN Red List and the North East Atlantic population is classed as Critically Endangered.
