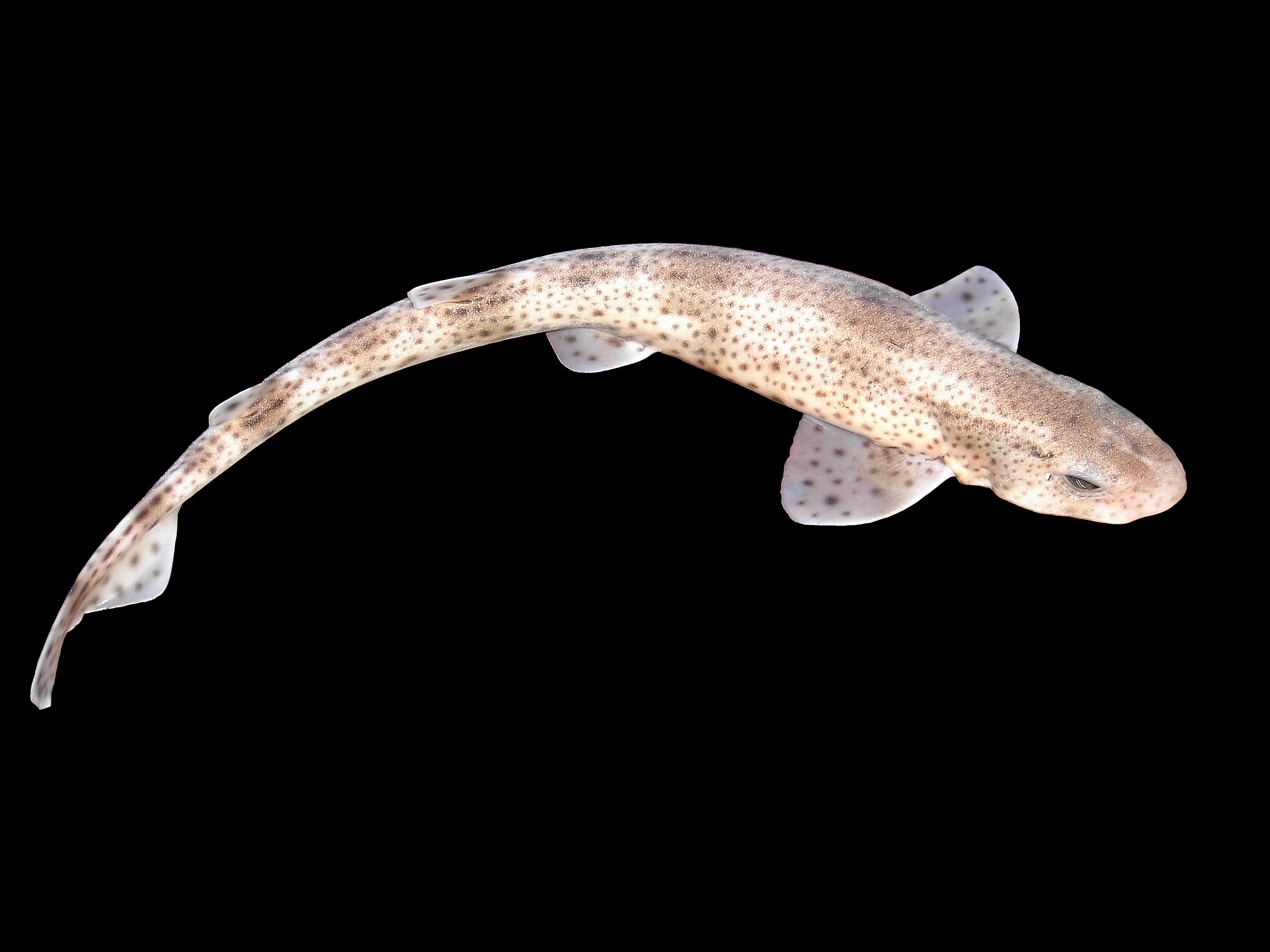

Conservation status
- Least Concern (IUCN 3.1)

Scientific classification
- Kingdom: Animalia
- Phylum: Chordata
- Class: Chondrichthyes
- Subclass: Elasmobranchii
- Division: Selachii
- Order: Carcharhiniformes
- Family: Scyliorhinidae
- Genus: Scyliorhinus
- Species: S. canicula

Binomial name
- Scyliorhinus canicula (Linnaeus, 1758)
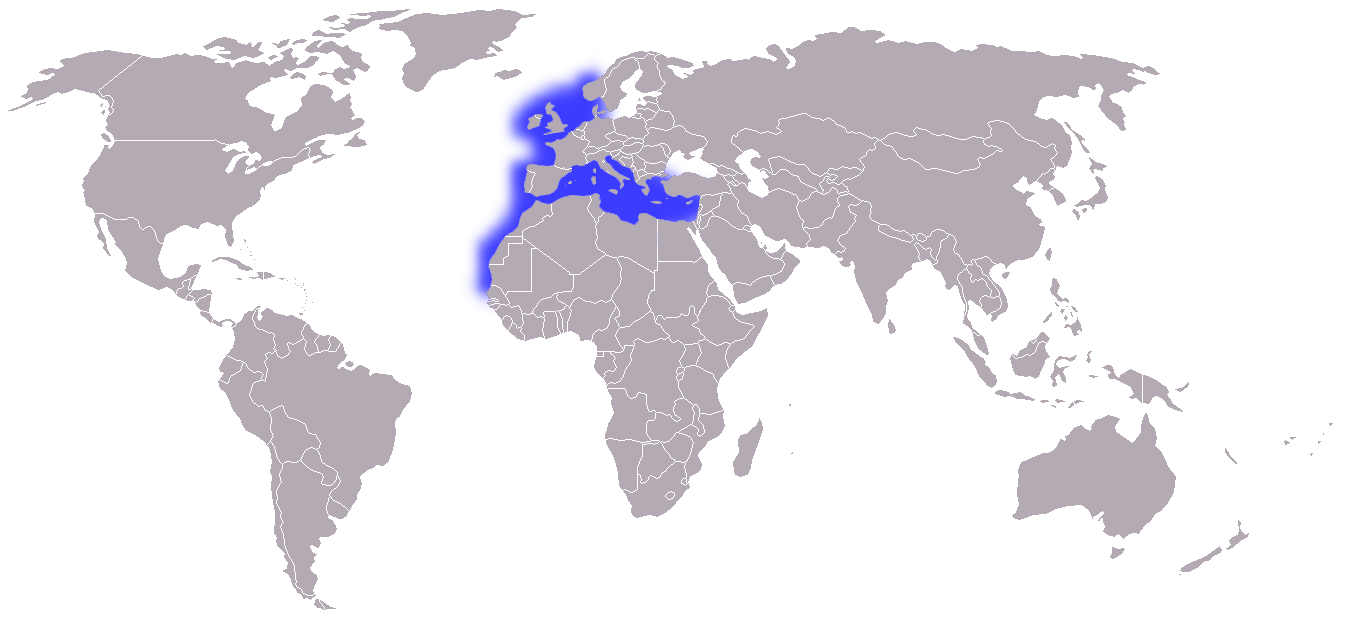
- Range in blue

= Small-spotted catshark =

Species of shark

The small-spotted catshark (Scyliorhinus canicula), also known as the sandy dogfish, lesser-spotted dogfish, rough-hound or morgay (in Scotland and Cornwall), is a catshark of the family Scyliorhinidae. It is found on the continental shelves and the uppermost continental slopes off the coasts of Norway and the British Isles south to Senegal and in the Mediterranean, between latitudes 63° N and 12° N. It can grow up to a length of 1 m (3 ft 3 in), and it can weigh more than 2 kg (4.4 lb). It is found primarily over sandy, gravelly, or muddy bottoms from depths of a few metres down to 400 m (1,310 ft). S. canicula is one of the most abundant elasmobranchs in the northeast Atlantic and Mediterranean Sea. The majority of the populations are stable in most areas.

== Description ==
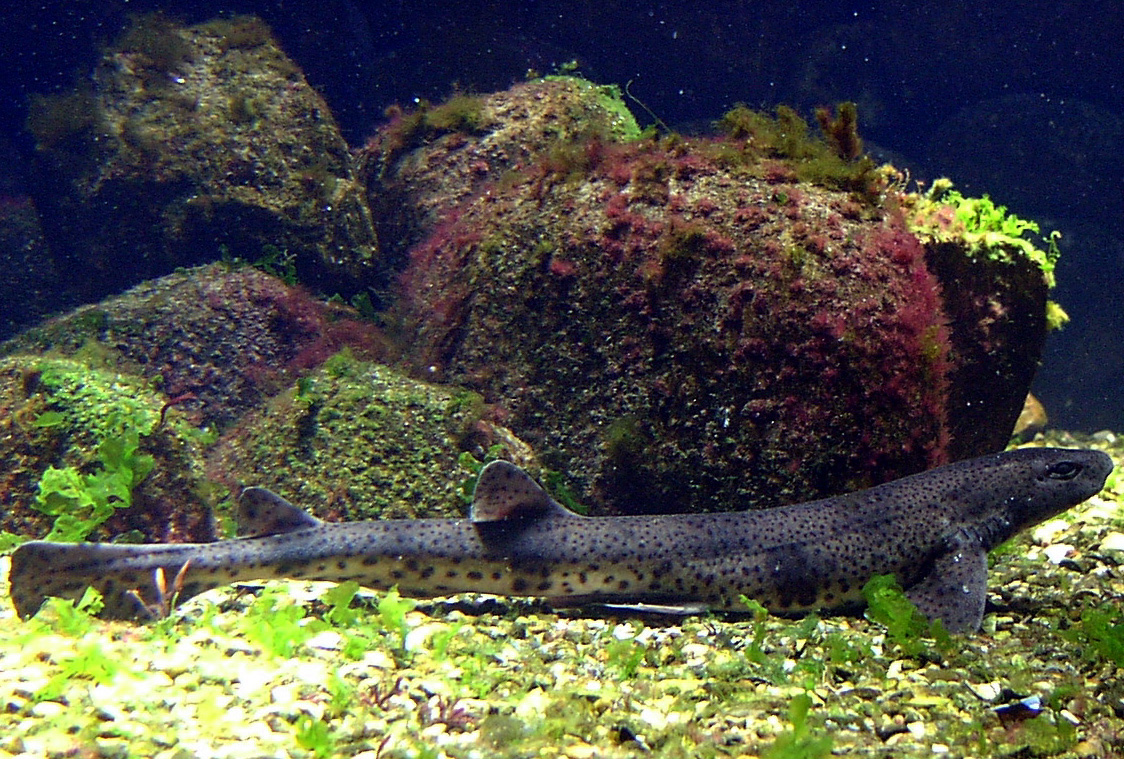
Adult fish in aquarium

S. canicula are small, shallow-water sharks with a slender body and a blunt head. The two dorsal fins are located towards the tail end of the body. The texture of their skin is rough, similar to the coarseness of sandpaper. The nostrils are located on the underside of the snout and are connected to the mouth by a curved groove. The upper side of the body is greyish brown with dark brown spots. The underside is a light greyish white. The teeth of S. canicula are larger in males than in females; in addition, male S. canicula from West African waters have stronger, larger, and more calcinated jaws. The differences in mouth dimensions and tooth length between males and females, and between immature and adult males, could be due to different feeding habits or adaptations for reproductive behaviour.

== Reproduction ==
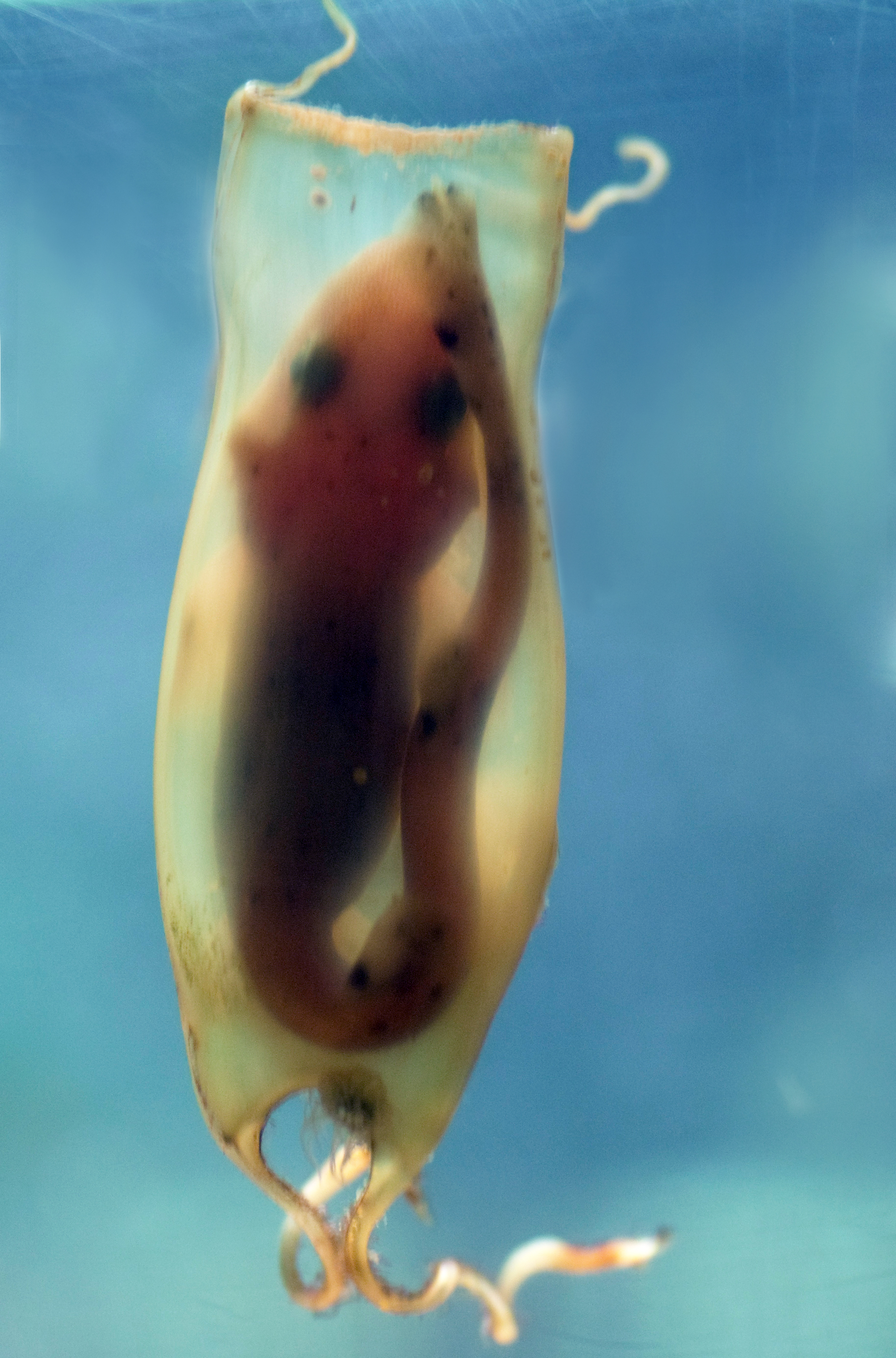
Egg with mature embryo

S. canicula is oviparous. They deposit egg cases protected by a horny capsule with long tendrils. Egg cases are mostly deposited on macroalgae in shallow coastal waters. When the egg cases are deposited farther from shore, they are placed on sessile erect invertebrates. Egg cases usually measure 4 cm (1.6 in) by 2 cm (0.79 in), without ever exceeding 6 cm (2.4 in). These egg cases can be found around the coasts of Europe. The embryos develop for 5–11 months depending on the sea temperature, and the young are born with a measurement of 9–10 cm (3.5–3.9 in).

Spawning can take place almost year round. However, there can be seasonal patterns in spawning activity as well. For example, S. canicula females located off the Mediterranean coast of France lay their eggs from March to June and in December. In the waters surrounding Great Britain, egg laying occurs in spring with a gap between August and October. On the Tunisian coast, the sharks lay their eggs starting in spring, peaking in the summer and then slightly decreasing during autumn. Males reach sexual maturity with a length of about 37.1–48.8 cm (14.6–19.2 in). Females reach sexual maturity with a length of 36.4–46.7 cm (14.3–18.4 in).

== Feeding ==
S. canicula is an opportunistic species, preying on a wide variety of organisms. Decapod crustaceans, molluscs and fishes are their main prey, but echinoderms, polychaetes, sipunculids and tunicates may also be eaten. Dietary preferences change with age; younger animals prefer small crustaceans, while older animals prefer hermit crabs and molluscs. Feeding intensity is highest during the summer due to the higher availability of prey life. Diet composition varies with body size.

There are no significant differences in feeding habits between male and female S. canicula. Juveniles of S. canicula feed by anchoring the prey item on the dermal denticles near their tail, and tearing bite-sized pieces off with rapid head and jaw movements, a behaviour known as "scale rasping". Use of dermal denticles to assist in feeding was first documented in this species.

== Psychology ==
A study published in 2014 at Exeter University showed that individual small-spotted catsharks have different personality traits. Some individuals are more sociable than others, some more aggressive, some more exploratory in nature.

== Model organism ==
S. canicula is well-suited for comparative analysis of gastrulation for several reasons.

- It is harvested in large numbers along all the coasts of Europe, and it is the only known elasmobranch species from which individuals at any stage of development can be obtained in abundance at any time of year.
- Fertilization is internal, but eggs are laid at early stages of development, before the formation of the blastocoel. Once laid, they can go on developing normally in the laboratory, simply in oxygenated seawater.
- The size and accessibility of the embryo makes analysis easier.
- Five well-characterized stages can be distinguished between the onset of gastrulation and the beginning of neurulation.

== Threat level ==
S. canicula is one of the most abundant elasmobranchs in the northeast Atlantic and Mediterranean. It is regularly caught by near-shore fisheries, but the majority taken by commercial fishermen and recreational anglers are discarded. Studies have shown that post-discard survival rates are extremely high, around 98%. Although localized depletion may have occurred in some areas, surveys have shown that populations are stable or are even increasing throughout the majority of its range. However, continued monitoring of landing and discarded data is important to avoid any future decline.

This species is currently listed as being of least concern on the IUCN Red List of Threatened Species, because there is no evidence to indicate that the global population has declined significantly. Since 2003, there have been yearly releases of these sharks into the Gullmarn fjord in Sweden by the public aquaria Havets Hus in Lysekil. More than 90 sharks have been released since 2003, of which one was found in southern Norway 10 years after its release. This means that these sharks can reach at least an age of 14 years.

== Human consumption and use ==
S. canicula is currently of low commercial value. In the recent past, it was one of the species sold in English and Scottish fish and chip shops as rock salmon, rock eel, huss, or sweet william. In other parts of its range, it is occasionally baked or used in fish soup. Its hard skin has been used as a substitute for pumice, but the fact that catsharks have to be skinned before they can be filleted discourages commercial fishermen from catching this species.

== See also ==
- Greater spotted dogfish
