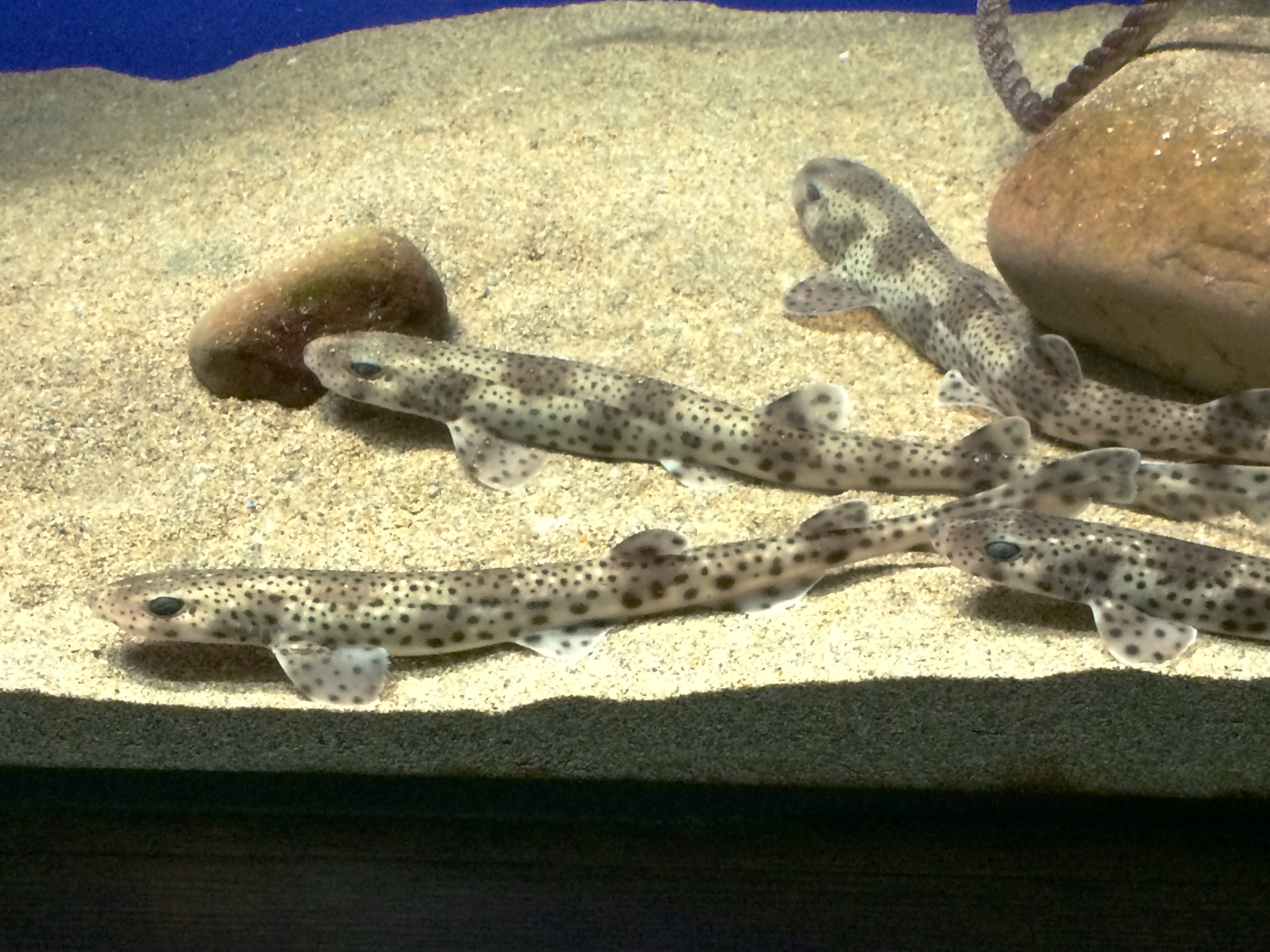
- Nursehound (Scyliorhinus stellaris)

Scientific classification
- Kingdom: Animalia
- Phylum: Chordata
- Class: Chondrichthyes
- Subclass: Elasmobranchii
- Division: Selachii
- Order: Carcharhiniformes
- Family: Scyliorhinidae
- Genus: Scyliorhinus; Blainville, 1816

Type species
- Squalus canicula Linnaeus, 1758

= Scyliorhinus =

Scyliorhinus Temporal range: 104–0 Ma Late Albian to present

Genus of sharks

Scyliorhinus is a genus of catsharks in the family Scyliorhinidae. This genus is known in the fossil records from the Cretaceous period, late Albian age to the Pliocene epoch.

== Species ==
There are currently 16 recognized species in this genus:

- Scyliorhinus boa Goode & T. H. Bean, 1896 (boa catshark)
- Scyliorhinus cabofriensis K. D. A. Soares, U. L. Gomes & M. R. de Carvalho, 2016
- Scyliorhinus canicula (Linnaeus, 1758) (small-spotted catshark)
- Scyliorhinus capensis (J. P. Müller & Henle, 1838) (yellowspotted catshark)
- Scyliorhinus cervigoni Maurin & M. Bonnet, 1970 (West African catshark)
- Scyliorhinus comoroensis L. J. V. Compagno, 1988 (Comoro catshark)
- Scyliorhinus garmani (Fowler, 1934) (brownspotted catshark)
- Scyliorhinus hachijoensis (Ito, Fujii, Nohara & Tanaka, 2022) (cinder cloudy catshark)
- Scyliorhinus haeckelii (A. Miranda-Ribeiro, 1907) (freckled catshark)
- Scyliorhinus hesperius S. Springer, 1966 (whitesaddled catshark)
- Scyliorhinus meadi S. Springer, 1966 (blotched catshark)
- Scyliorhinus retifer (Garman, 1881) (chain catshark)
- Scyliorhinus stellaris (Linnaeus, 1758) (nursehound)
- Scyliorhinus tokubee Shirai, S. Hagiwara & Nakaya, 1992 (Izu catshark)
- Scyliorhinus torazame (S. Tanaka (I), 1908) (cloudy catshark)
- Scyliorhinus torrei Howell-Rivero, 1936 (dwarf catshark)
- Scyliorhinus ugoi K. D. A. Soares, Gadig & U. L. Gomes, 2015 (dark freckled catshark)

== Extinct species ==
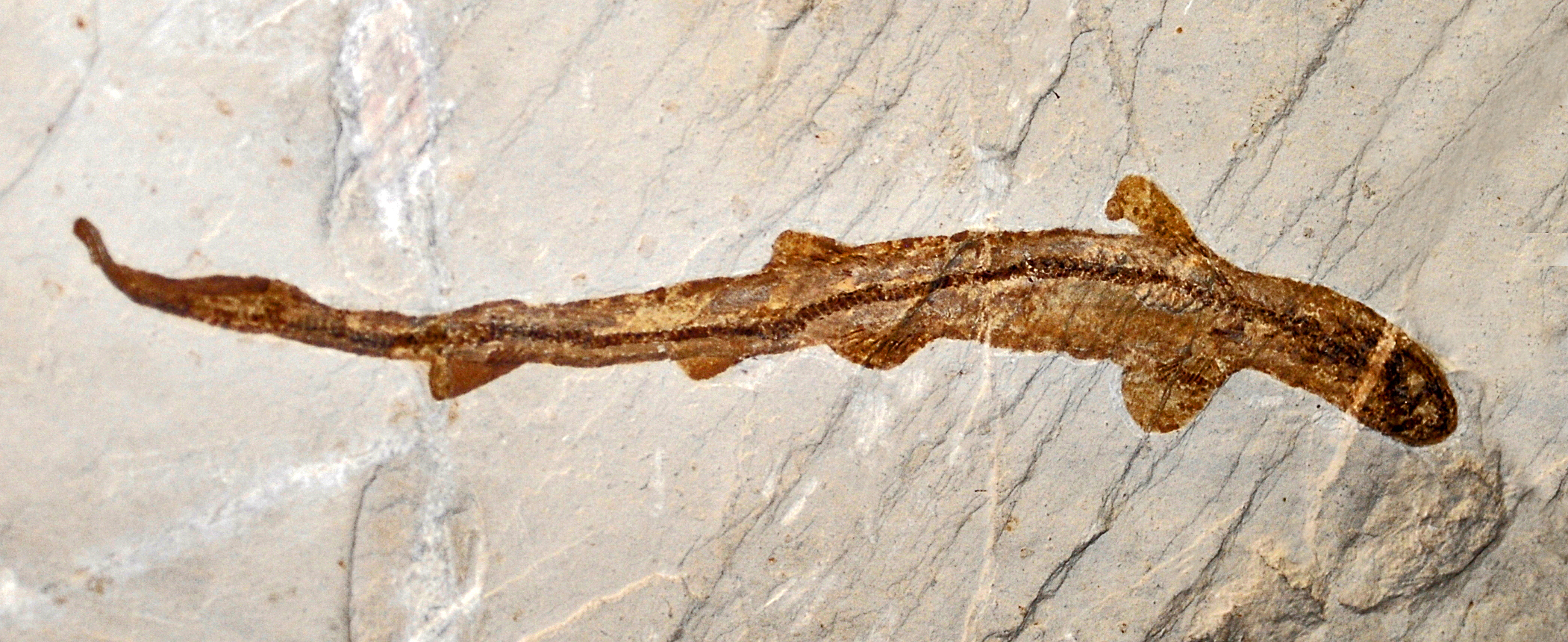
Fossil of Scyliorhinus elongatus from the Cretaceous of Lebanon

- †Scyliorhinus ambliatlanticus Lautiro Mora, 1999
- †Scyliorhinus angustus (Münster, 1843)
- †Scyliorhinus antiquus (Agassiz, 1843)
- †Scyliorhinus arambourgi Cappetta, 1980
- †Scyliorhinus arlingtonensis Cappetta & Case, 1999
- †Scyliorhinus biddlei Halter, 1995
- †Scyliorhinus biformis Reinecke, 2014
- †Scyliorhinus bloti Cappetta, 1980
- †Scyliorhinus brumarivulensis Underwood & Ward, 2008
- †Scyliorhinus cepaeformis Halter, 1990
- †Scyliorhinus coupatezi Herman, 1974
- †Scyliorhinus dubius (Woodward, 1889)
- †Scyliorhinus elongatus (Davis, 1887)
- †Scyliorhinus entomodon Noubhani & Cappetta, 1997
- †Scyliorhinus fossilis (Leriche, 1927)
- †Scyliorhinus ivagrantae Case & Cappetta, 1997
- †Scyliorhinus joleaudi Cappetta, 1970
- †Scyliorhinus kannenbergi Leder, 2015
- †Scyliorhinus kasenoi Karasawa, 1989
- †Scyliorhinus luypaertsi Halter, 1995
- †Scyliorhinus malembeensis Dartevelle & Casier, 1959
- †Scyliorhinus monsaugustus Guinot, Underwood, Cappetta & Ward, 2013
- †Scyliorhinus moosi Herman, 1975
- †Scyliorhinus muelleri Guinot, Underwood, Cappetta & Ward, 2013
- †Scyliorhinus musteliformis Herman, 1977
- †Scyliorhinus ptychtus Noubhani & Cappetta, 1997
- †Scyliorhinus reyndersi Halter, 1995
- †Scyliorhinus suelstorfensis Reinecke, 2014
- †Scyliorhinus sulcidens Noubhani & Cappetta, 1997
- †Scyliorhinus taylorensis Cappetta & Case, 1999
- †Scyliorhinus tensleepensis Case, 1987
- †Scyliorhinus trifolius Adnet, 2006
- †Scyliorhinus wardi Halter, 1990
- †Scyliorhinus weemsi, 2022
- †Scyliorhinus woodwardi Cappetta, 1976
