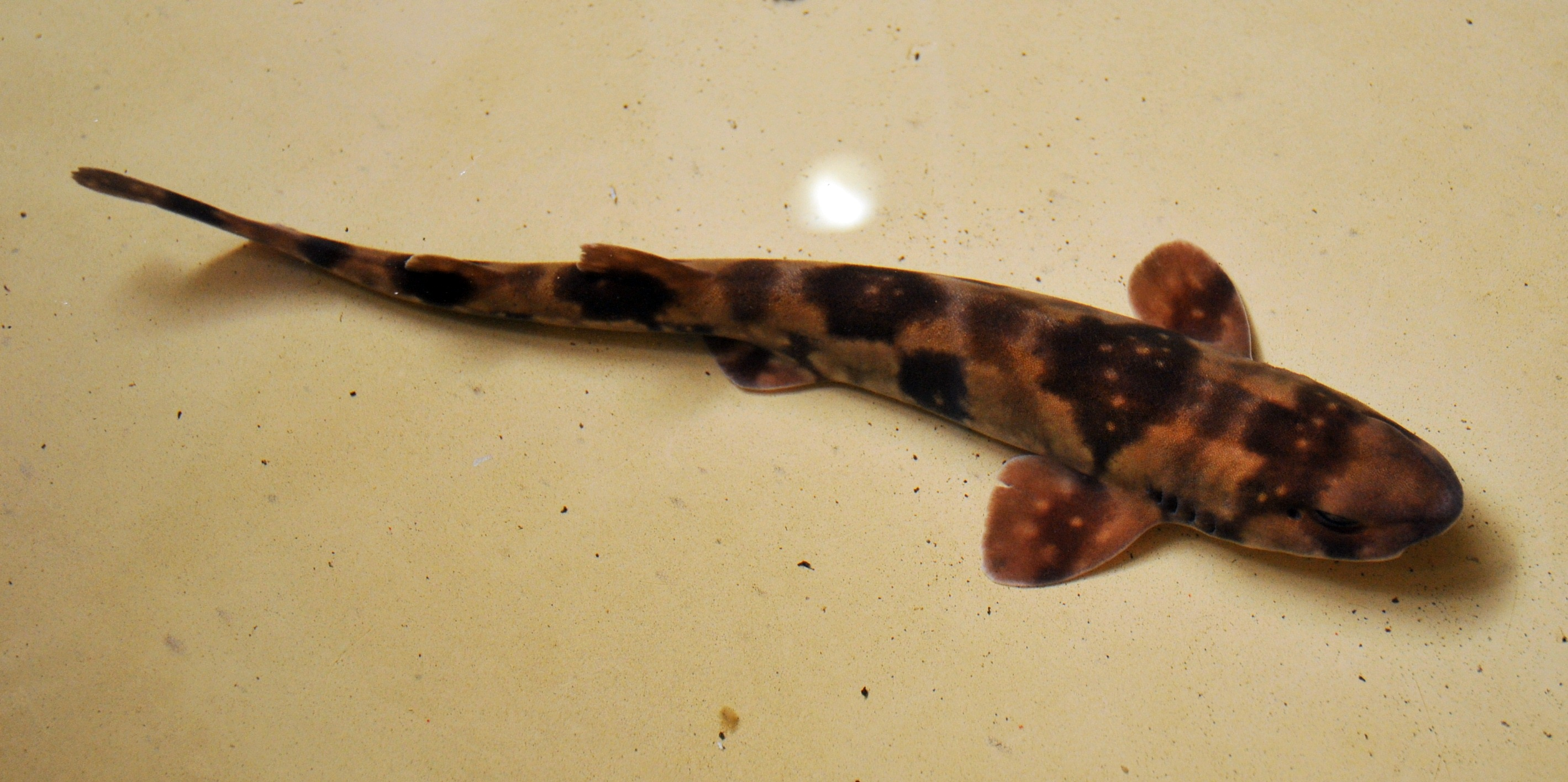

Conservation status
- Least Concern (IUCN 3.1)

Scientific classification
- Kingdom: Animalia
- Phylum: Chordata
- Class: Chondrichthyes
- Subclass: Elasmobranchii
- Division: Selachii
- Order: Carcharhiniformes
- Family: Scyliorhinidae
- Genus: Scyliorhinus
- Species: S. torazame

Binomial name
- Scyliorhinus torazame (S. Tanaka (I), 1908)
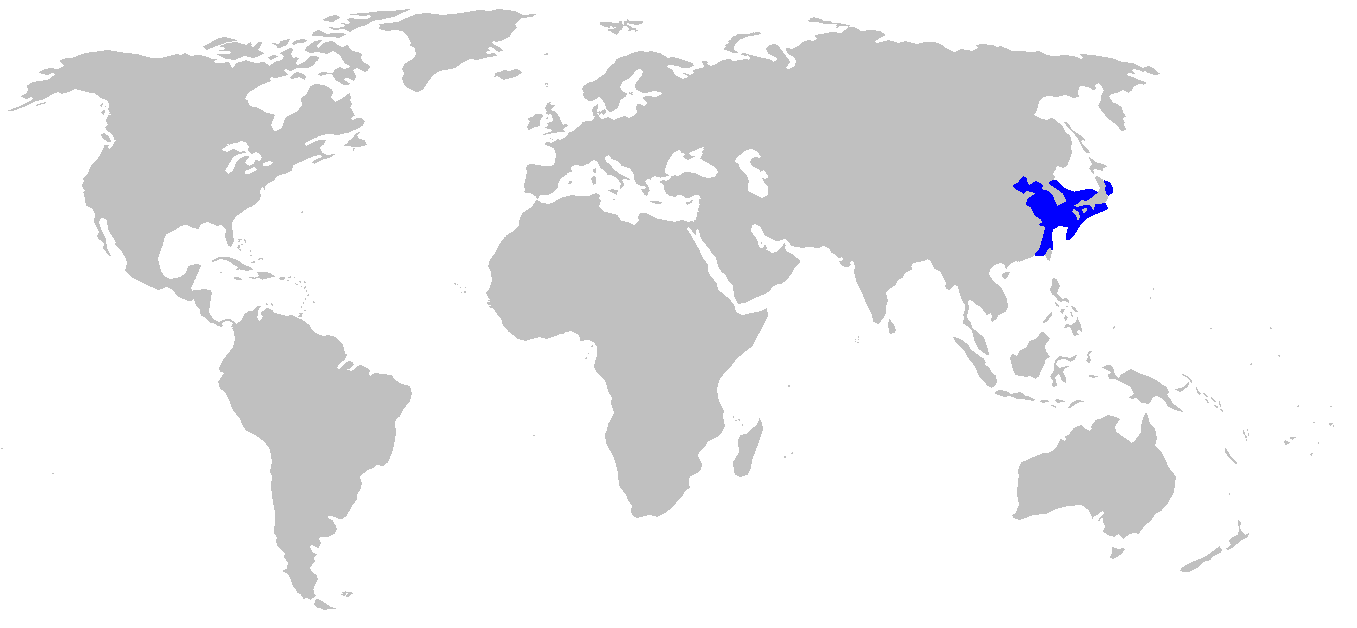
- Range of the cloudy catshark

Synonyms
- Catulus torazame Tanaka, 1908; Scyliorhinus rudis Pietschmann, 1908

= Cloudy catshark =

Species of shark

The cloudy catshark (Scyliorhinus torazame) is a common species of catshark, belonging to the family Scyliorhinidae. It is a bottom-dweller that inhabits rocky reefs in the northwestern Pacific Ocean, from the shore to a depth of 320 m (1,050 ft). Growing up to 50 cm (20 in) long, this small, slim shark has a narrow head with a short blunt snout, no grooves between the nostrils and mouth, and furrows on the lower but not the upper jaw. It is also characterized by extremely rough skin and coloration consisting of a series of dark brown saddles along its back and tail, along with various darker and lighter spots in larger individuals.

The diet of the cloudy catshark consists of molluscs, crustaceans, and bony fishes. It is oviparous, with females laying encapsulated eggs two at a time in nursery areas. The claspers of the male bear numerous hooks that likely serve to facilitate copulation. This harmless shark can be readily maintained in captivity and is used as a model organism for biological research. It is caught incidentally, and generally discarded, by commercial fisheries. These activities do not appear to have negatively affected its population, leading it to be listed under Least Concern by the International Union for Conservation of Nature (IUCN).

== Taxonomy ==
The original description of the cloudy catshark was published in 1908 by Shigeho Tanaka in the Journal of the Faculty of Science, University of Tokyo. He gave it the specific epithet torazame, which is its Japanese name (虎鮫, literally "tiger shark"), and assigned it to the genus Catulus. The type specimen was a 45 cm (18 in) long adult male caught off Misaki, Kanagawa, Japan. Subsequent authors have synonymized Catulus with Scyliorhinus.

== Description ==
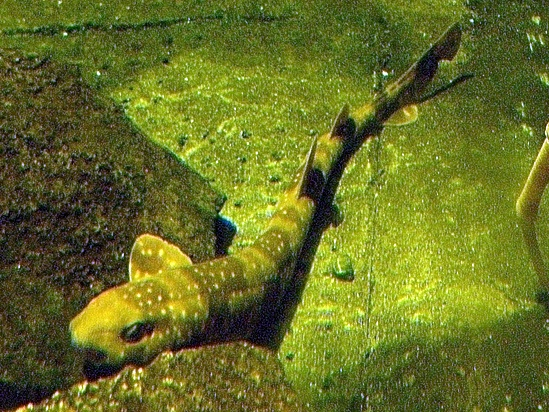
Large cloudy catsharks have light spots in addition to dark dorsal saddles

The cloudy catshark reaches 50 cm (20 in) long and has a thin, deep, and firm body. The narrow head makes up slightly under one-sixth of the total length, and is two-thirds as wide as it is long. The snout is short and rounded. The large nostrils are preceded by small, triangular flaps of skin that do not reach the wide mouth. The medium-sized eyes are horizontally oval, equipped with rudimentary nictitating membranes (protective third eyelids), and followed by moderate spiracles. There are no grooves between the nostrils and the mouth. There are furrows extending from the corners of the mouth over the lower jaw only. The small teeth have a long central cusp typically flanked by two pairs of cusplets. The five pairs of gill slits are short, with the fourth pair over the pectoral fin origins.

The two dorsal fins are placed towards the back of the body, with the first originating over the rear of the pelvic fin bases. The first dorsal fin has a rounded apex and is larger than the second dorsal fin, which has a more angular shape. The pectoral and pelvic fins are moderate in size. In males, the inner margins of the pelvic fins are merged to form an "apron" over the long, cylindrical claspers. The origin of the anal fin lies approximately between the dorsal fins. The caudal peduncle is about as deep as the body, and leads to a low caudal fin with an indistinct lower lobe and a ventral notch near the tip of the upper lobe. The skin is thick and very rough due to the dermal denticles, which are large and upright with three backward-pointing teeth. This species is brown on the back and sides, with 6–10 indistinct darker dorsal saddles, and plain yellowish on its ventral side. Larger sharks also have many large, irregularly shaped light and dark spots.

== Distribution and habitat ==
The cloudy catshark is common in the northwestern Pacific off Japan, Korea, China, and possibly the Philippines. Bottom-dwelling in nature, this species can be found from the shore out to a depth of 320 m (1,050 ft) on the continental shelf and upper continental slope. It favors rocky reefs and does not appear to be migratory.

== Biology and ecology ==
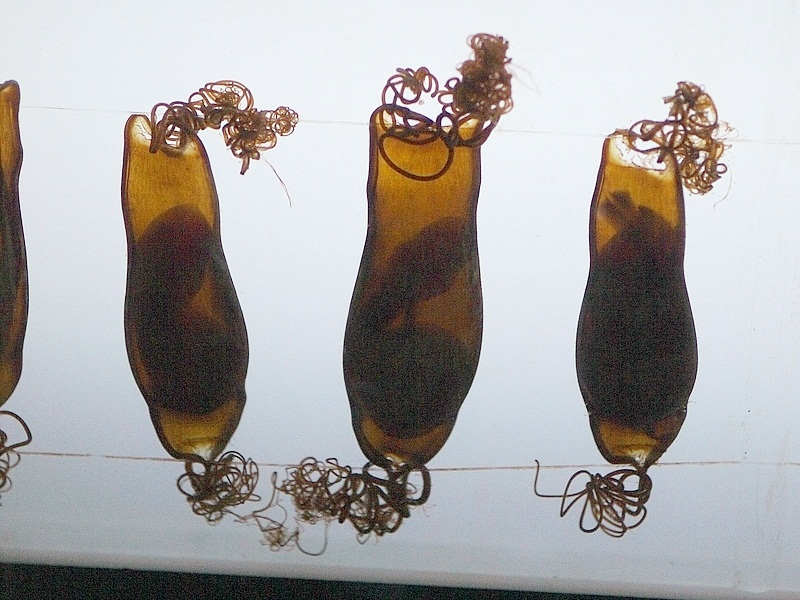
Egg capsules of the cloudy catshark with visible embryos

The cloudy catshark feeds primarily on molluscs, followed by crustaceans and bony fishes. A predator of both this shark and its egg cases is the blotchy swell shark (Cephaloscyllium umbratile). A known parasite of this species is the myxosporidian Chloromyxum scyliorhinum. Reproduction is oviparous; adult females have a single functional ovary and two functional oviducts. As a prelude to mating, the male bites at the female's pectoral fin, side, and gill region. Once he has a grip, he wraps his body around hers and inserts one of his claspers into her cloaca. Copulation may last between 15 seconds and 4 minutes. The claspers of the male are unusual in that each has a row of around a hundred hooks running along the inner margin. These hooks likely serve to anchor the male to the female during copulation. The female is capable of storing sperm within her nidamental gland (an organ that secretes egg cases) for many months.

Females produce two mature eggs at a time, one per oviduct. The eggs are enclosed in smooth, translucent yellow, vase-shaped capsules measuring 1.9 cm (0.75 in) across and 5.5 cm (2.2 in) long. There are long tendrils at the four corners of the capsule. The eggs are laid in defined nursery areas: One such area is located at a depth of 100 m (330 ft) off Hakodate. When the embryo is 3.6 cm (1.4 in) long, it has external gills, undeveloped fins, and no pigmentation. At an embryonic length of 5.8 cm (2.3 in), the external gills have all but disappeared, and a covering of small denticles is present. By a length of 7.9 cm (3.1 in), the embryo has well-developed fins and pigmentation, and generally resembles the adult. The eggs take 15 months to hatch at 11.3 °C (52.3 °F), and 7–9 months to hatch at 14.5 °C (58.1 °F). The newly hatched shark measures 8 cm (3.1 in) long or more. Maturation size tends to increase with decreasing water temperature: Off northerly Hakodate, both sexes mature at over 38 cm (15 in) long, while some females remain immature even at 47 cm (19 in) long. By contrast, off southerly Tsushima Island both sexes mature at around 33 cm (13 in) long. The maximum lifespan is at least 12 years.

== Human interactions ==
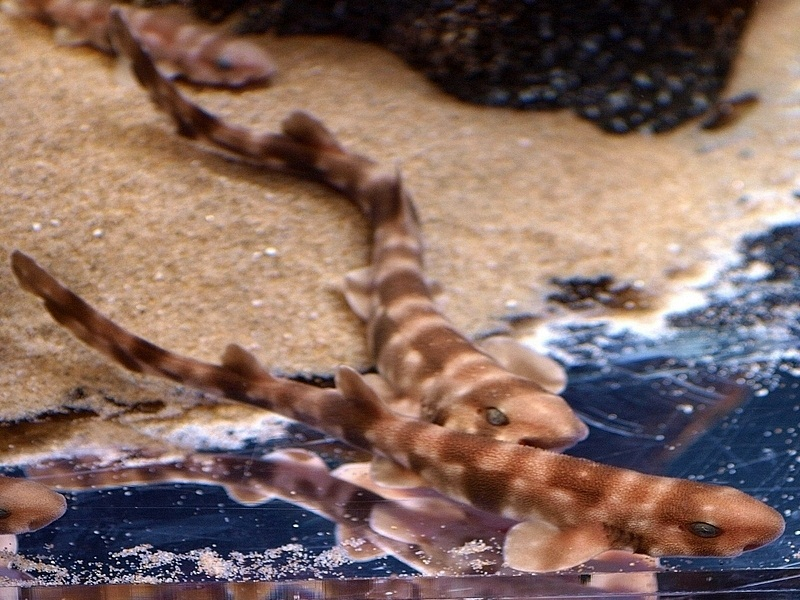
Several young cloudy catsharks at a public aquarium

Harmless to humans, the cloudy catshark adapts well to captivity and has reproduced in the aquarium. It is often used as a model organism in physiology research. On September 25, 1995, Masuda Motoyashi and colleagues used this species to perform the first successful artificial insemination of a shark or ray. The cloudy catshark is caught incidentally by commercial fisheries with bottom fishing nets including trawls and gillnets, as well as on bottom longlines. Captured individuals are typically discarded, possibly with a high survival rate due to their hardiness. Some 40% of the fish discarded in Yamaguchi Prefecture fisheries are of this species. The bottom trawl fishery operating off Fukushima Prefecture may catch over a ton of cloudy catsharks annually, which are also discarded.

Despite heavy fishing pressure within its range, the cloudy catshark remains common, perhaps because it may be more biologically productive than most other sharks. As a result, it has been assessed as Least Concern by the International Union for Conservation of Nature (IUCN). Cloudy catsharks from a number of locations off Japan have been found to be contaminated with polychlorinated biphenyls (PCBs) and dichlorodiphenyldichloroethylene (DDEs), which they acquire from their food. One likely source of these pollutants is the use of the pesticide DDT by developing nations in southern Asia.
