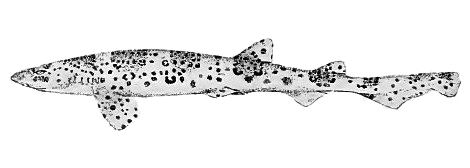

Conservation status
- Data Deficient (IUCN 3.1)

Scientific classification
- Kingdom: Animalia
- Phylum: Chordata
- Class: Chondrichthyes
- Subclass: Elasmobranchii
- Division: Selachii
- Order: Carcharhiniformes
- Family: Scyliorhinidae
- Genus: Scyliorhinus
- Species: S. haeckelii

Binomial name
- Scyliorhinus haeckelii (A. Miranda-Ribeiro, 1907)
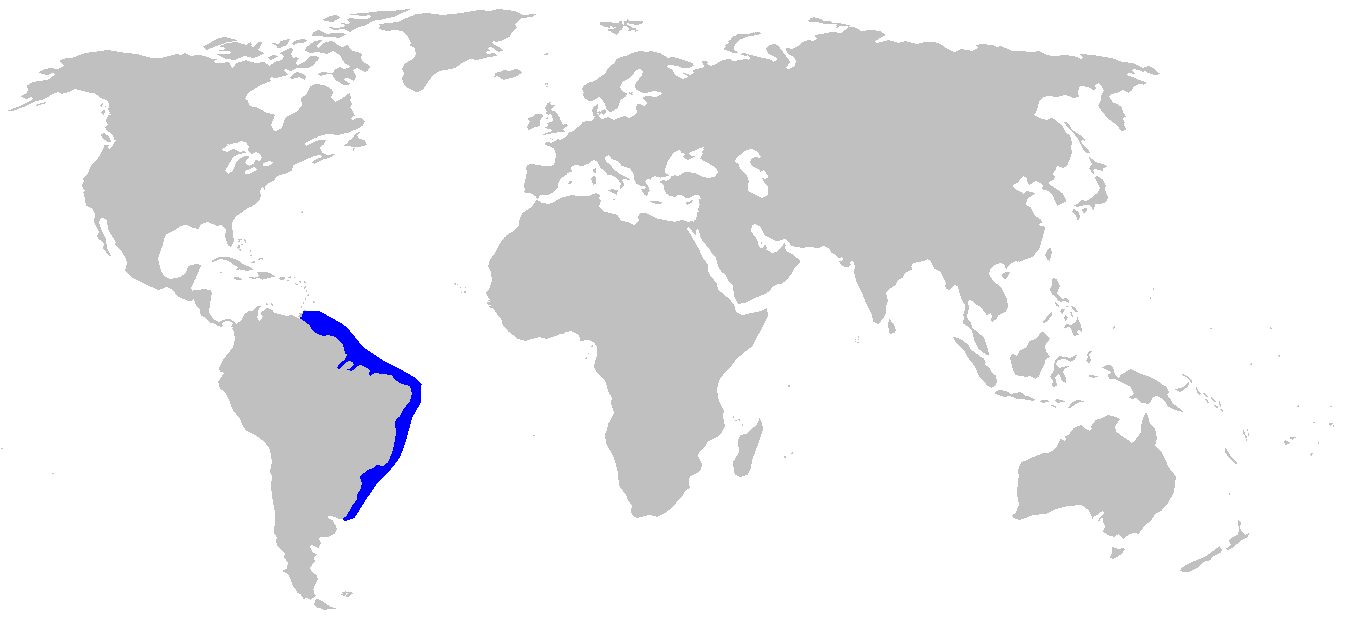

Synonyms
- Scyliorhinus besnardi Springer & Sadowsky, 1970

= Freckled catshark =

Species of shark

The freckled catshark (Scyliorhinus haeckelii) is a catshark of the family Scyliorhinidae. It is found on the continental shelf and upper slope from the western Atlantic from western Venezuela, Suriname, Brazil, and Uruguay, between latitudes 11° N and 32° S. However, specimens from the northern part of this range probably refer to other species.

== Description ==
The freckled catshark ranges from 10 to 13 cm long as a hatchling and can range from 25 to 60 cm as it reaches maturity. It is known for its long slender body and for its dark saddles with small black dots covering the dorsal area. The head of the shark contains no nasoral grooves and the small nasal flaps of the shark do not reach its mouth. Their mouth contains grooves on the lower lip only. The first dorsal fins are located behind the pelvic insertions and the second are located anterior to anal insertion. The second dorsal fin is smaller than the first.

== Distribution and habitat ==
The freckled catshark inhabits the tropical Atlantic oceans at depths of 37–402 m (121–1,319 ft) (mostly below 250 m). They take refuge in the deep reefs or the upper slopes of the reef. They are oviparous and deposit their egg cases on coral and sea-fan ocean floor. The egg sacks measure about 2.5 cm × 6 cm (0.98 in × 2.36 in).

== Fisheries ==
Traditionally, this species is of no interest for fisheries. It is taken as bycatch in bottom trawl and long-line fisheries. However, since early 2000s, it has attracted commercial interest in some areas of southern Brazil. Species-specific catch are not available.
