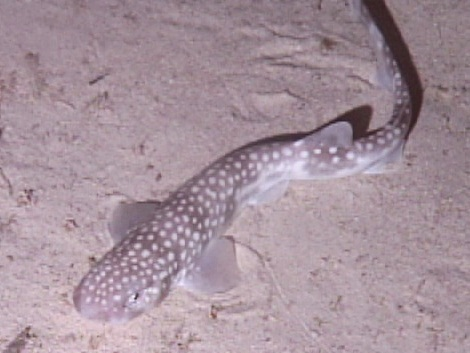

Conservation status
- Least Concern (IUCN 3.1)

Scientific classification
- Kingdom: Animalia
- Phylum: Chordata
- Class: Chondrichthyes
- Subclass: Elasmobranchii
- Division: Selachii
- Order: Carcharhiniformes
- Family: Scyliorhinidae
- Genus: Scyliorhinus
- Species: S. hesperius

Binomial name
- Scyliorhinus hesperius S. Springer, 1966
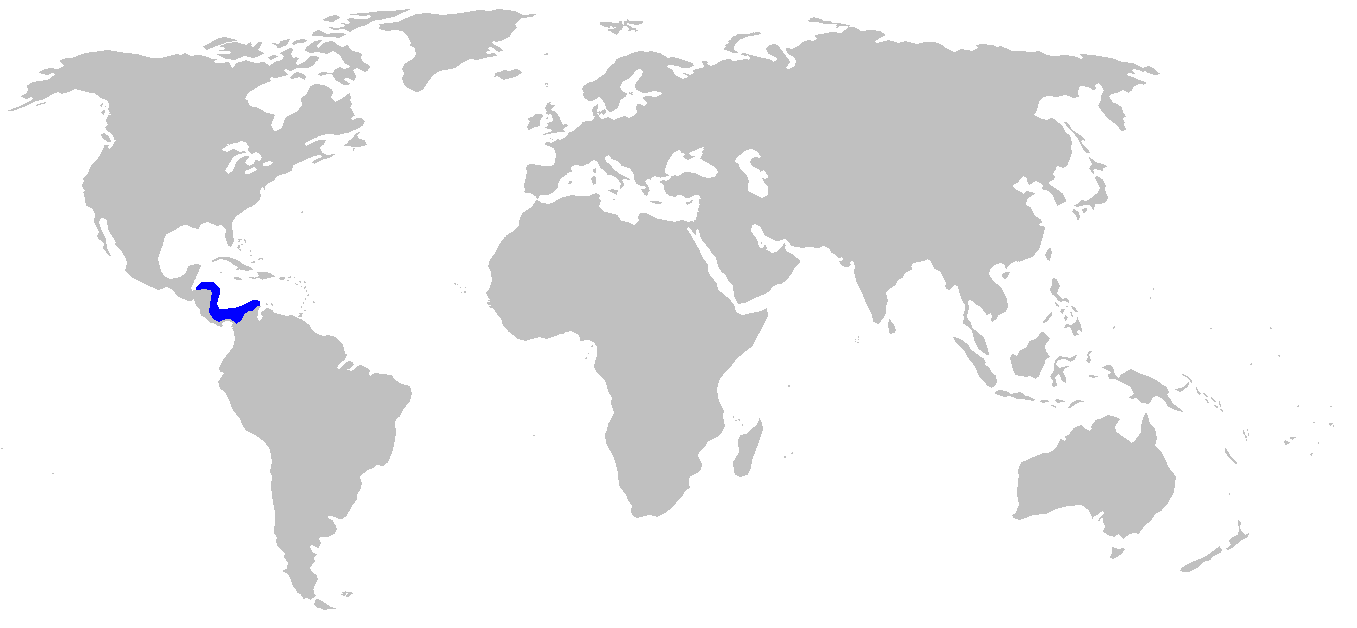
- Range of the whitesaddled catshark

= Whitesaddled catshark =

Species of shark

The whitesaddled catshark (Scyliorhinus hesperius) is a species of catshark, and part of the family Scyliorhinidae. It is found on the upper continental slope of the western central Atlantic Ocean, off the coasts of Honduras, Panama and Colombia, between latitudes 22° N and 9° N, at depths between 274 and 457 m (900 and 1,500 ft). It can grow to a length of 47 cm (19 in). The reproduction of this catshark is oviparous but otherwise, little is known about its biology.

== Description ==
The whitesaddled catshark is a moderately small, slender catshark that reaches a maximum length of 47 cm (19 in). The front of the first dorsal fin is located above and just behind the base of the pelvic fin and the front of the second dorsal fin is located above the hind third of the base of the anal fin. The first dorsal fin is considerably larger than the second and the distance between the two is about the same as the length of the anal fin. The skin is fairly smooth and there are small, flat denticles. There are seven or eight dark saddles on the back and flanks, the whole surface being scattered with large white spots, but this catshark does not have any black spots.

== Distribution and habitat ==
The whitesaddled catshark is found in the tropical western Atlantic and Caribbean Sea of Honduras, Panama and Colombia. It is a deep water, demersal fish and inhabits the continental slope at depths of between about 274 and 457 m (900 and 1,500 ft).

== Ecology ==
This fish is oviparous, producing two eggs at a time. The developing embryos feed on their egg yolks.

== Status ==
Very little is known of the biology of this species. It probably lives at depths too great to be a target for fisheries but seems to be an uncommon species. The International Union for Conservation of Nature has assessed its conservation status as "least concern".
