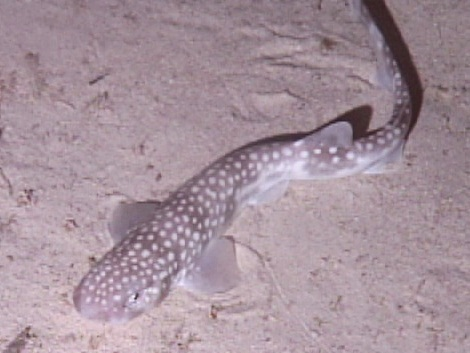
- Whitesaddled catshark, Scyliorhinus hesperius

Scientific classification
- Kingdom: Animalia
- Phylum: Chordata
- Class: Chondrichthyes
- Subclass: Elasmobranchii
- Division: Selachii
- Order: Carcharhiniformes
- Suborder: Scyliorhinoidei
- Family: Scyliorhinidae; T. N. Gill, 1862

= Scyliorhinidae =

Scyliorhinidae Temporal range: Upper Jurassic – Present

Family of fishes

Scyliorhinidae is a family of sharks, one of a few families whose members share the common name catsharks, belonging to the order Carcharhiniformes, the ground sharks. Although they are generally known as catsharks, some species can also be called dogfish due to previous naming. However, a dogfish may generally be distinguished from a catshark as catsharks lay eggs while dogfish have live young, as well as the fact that dogfish lack an anal fin. Like most bottom feeders, catsharks feed on benthic invertebrates and smaller fish. They are not harmful to humans. The family is paraphyletic, containing several distinct lineages that do not form a monophyletic group.

== Genera ==
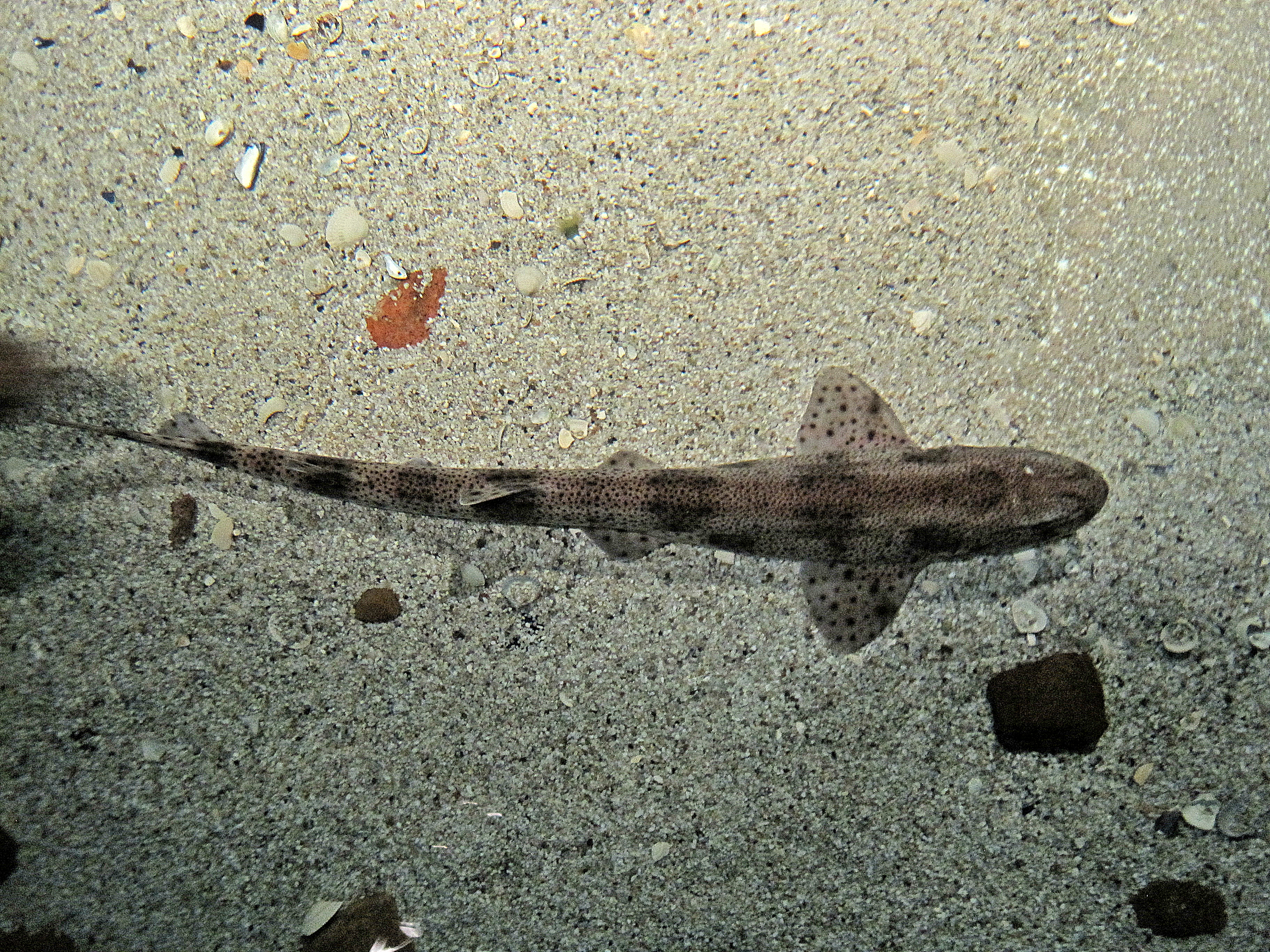
Small-spotted catshark

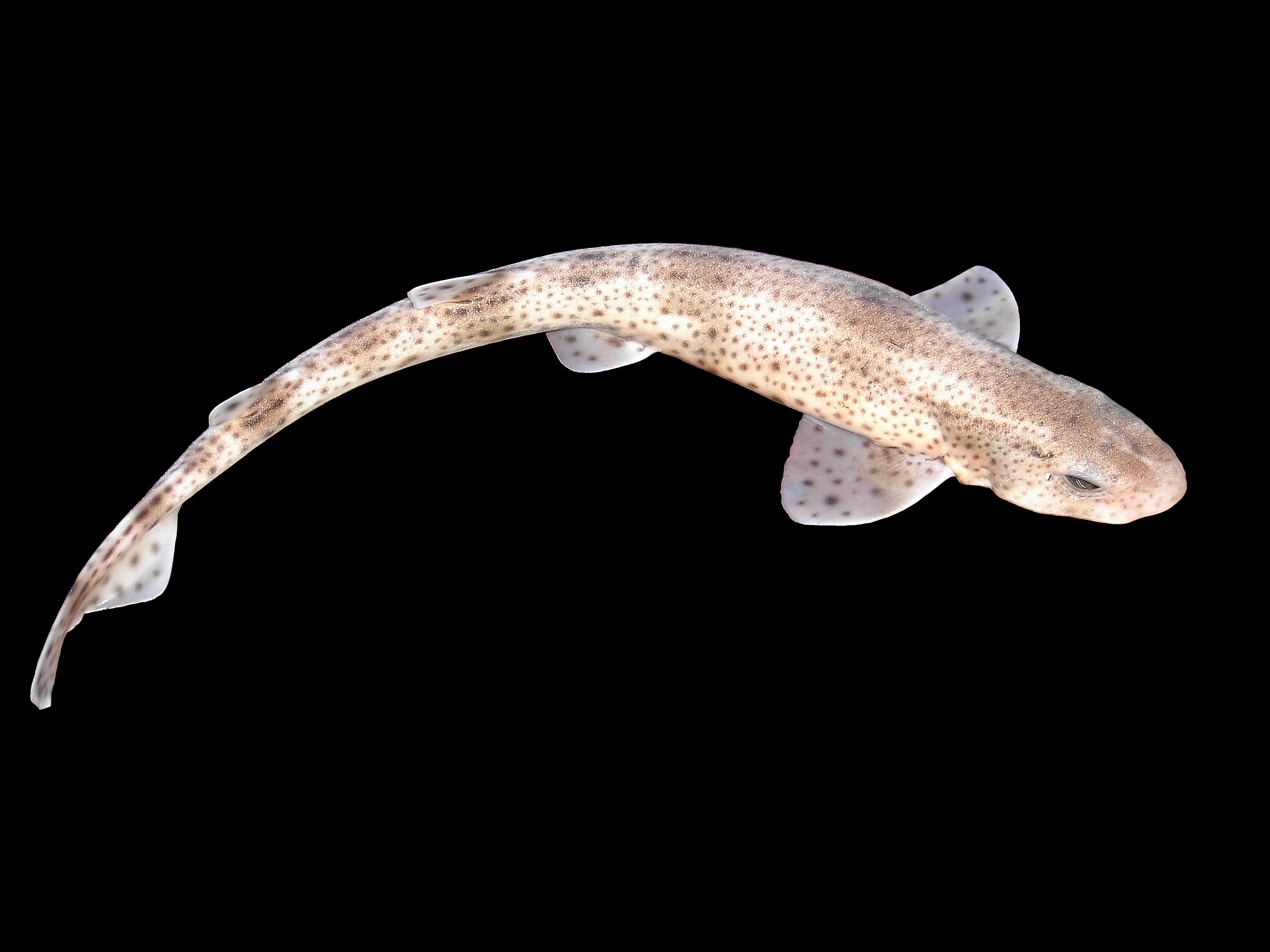
Small-spotted catshark, Scyliorhinus canicula

Scyliorhinidae includes the following genera:

- Cephaloscyllium T. N. Gill, 1862
- Poroderma A. Smith, 1838
- Scyliorhinus Blainville, 1816

== Anatomy and appearance ==
Scyliorhinidae catsharks may be distinguished by their elongated, cat-like eyes and two small dorsal fins set far back. Most species are fairly small, growing no longer than 80 cm (31 in); a few, such as the nursehound (Scyliorhinus stellaris) can reach 1.6 m (5.2 ft) in length. Most of the species have a patterned appearance, ranging from stripes to patches to spots.

Characteristics of genus Apristurus are mostly dark bodies, and having a long anal fin that ends in front of where the lower caudal fin begins. The snouts of the species of Apristurus are flat. They also present upper and lower labial furrows.

The sonic hedgehog dentition expression is first found as a bilateral symmetrical pattern and is found in certain areas of the embryonic jaw. Sonic hedgehog (a secreted protein that, in humans, is encoded by the SHH gene) is involved in the growth and patterning of different organs. Every 18–38 days the teeth are replaced as is a common characteristic of the developmental process of sharks.

The "swell sharks" of the genus Cephaloscyllium have the curious ability to fill their stomachs with water or air when threatened, increasing their girth by a factor of up to three.

Some catsharks, such as the chain catshark are biofluorescent.

== Distribution ==
Scyliorhinidae catsharks are found around seabeds in temperate and tropical seas worldwide, ranging from very shallow intertidal waters to depths of 2,000 m (6,600 ft) or more, such as the members of genus Apristurus. The red-spotted catshark lives in the shallower rocky waters ranging from Peru to Chile and migrates to deeper waters during the winter. They are usually restricted to small ranges. Juvenile and adult chain dogfish live on the soft or rocky bottom of the Atlantic from Massachusetts to Nicaragua. Adults tend to live on the soft, sandy bottoms possibly due to their need of egg deposition sites.

== Behaviour ==
Scyliorhinidae includes species that do not undergo long distance migrations because they are poor swimmers. Due to being nocturnal, some species sleep close together in crevices throughout the day and then go hunting at night. Some species such as the small spotted catshark, Scyliorhinus canicula, are sexually monomorphic and exhibit habitat segregation, where males and females live in separate areas; males tend to live in open seabeds, while females tend to live in caves. Some species of catsharks may deposit egg cases in structured habitats, which may also act as nurseries for the newly hatched sharks.

== Reproduction ==
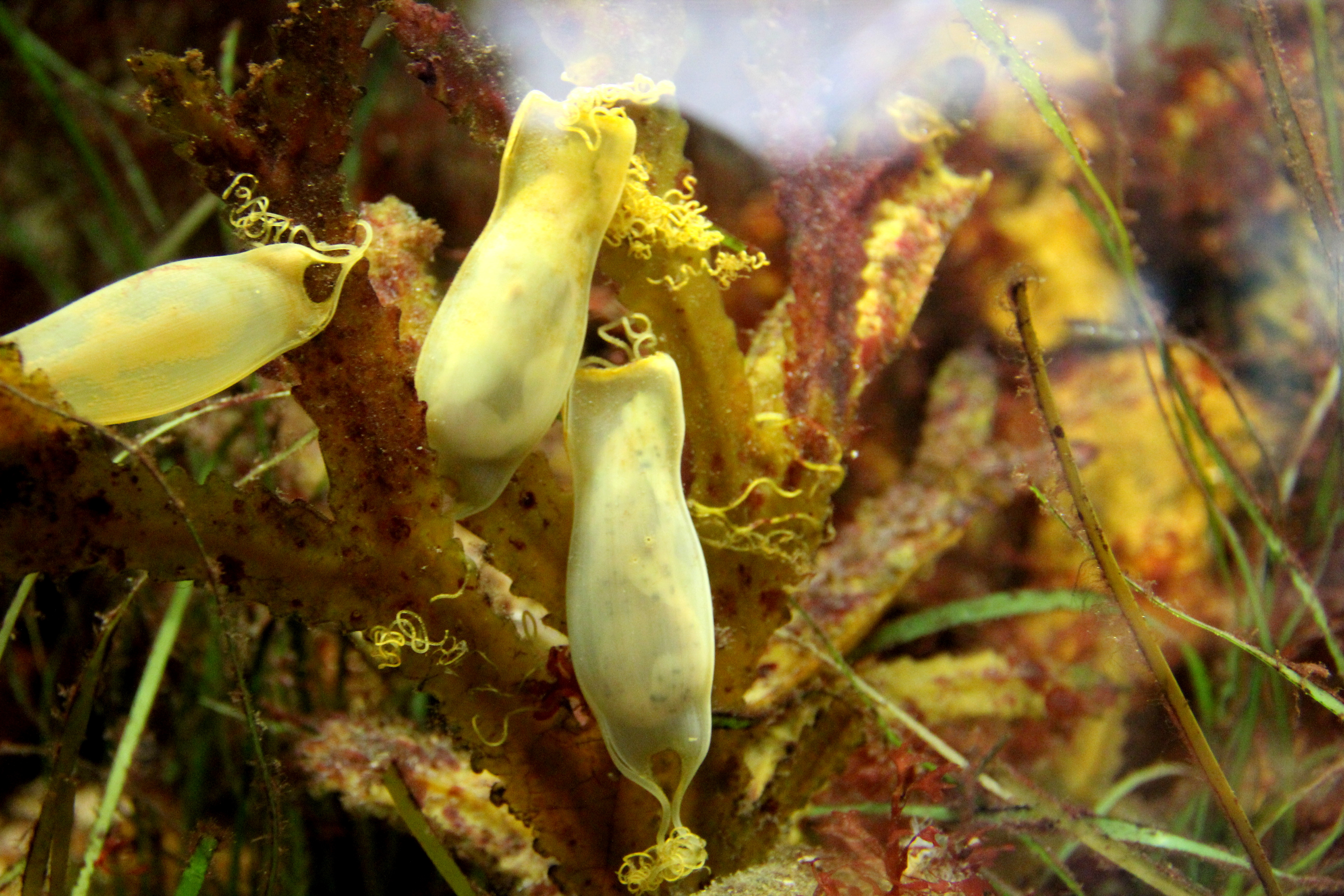
Catshark egg (mermaids' purse)

Scyliorhinidae includes many species of catsharks, that like the chain dogfish, are oviparous and lay eggs in tough egg cases with curly tendrils at each end, known as "mermaid's purses", for protection, onto the seabed. Almost a year is needed for a catshark to hatch from the egg. Instead of laying the eggs and letting them sit for a year, some species of catsharks hold onto the eggs until a few months before the shark hatches. Some catsharks exhibit ovoviviparity, aplacental viviparous, by holding onto the embryos until they are completely developed and then give live birth. Some species of catsharks mate by biting and holding the female's pectoral fins and wrestle her into a mating position.
