= Painted swellshark =

Scientific classification
- Kingdom: Animalia
- Phylum: Chordata
- Class: Chondrichthyes
- Subclass: Elasmobranchii
- Division: Selachii
- Order: Carcharhiniformes
- Family: Scyliorhinidae
- Genus: Cephaloscyllium
- Species: C. pictum

Binomial name
- Cephaloscyllium pictum Last, Séret & W. T. White, 2008

Species of shark

The painted swellshark (Cephaloscyllium pictum) is a little-known species of catshark, belonging to the family Scyliorhinidae, found in eastern Indonesia and Timor-Leste. This species reaches a maximum known length of 72 cm (28 in), and has a thick body with a short, broad and flattened head. It is dark gray with a variegated pattern of irregular darker and lighter blotches above, and lighter below with gray blotches and speckling on the snout. Like other swellsharks, it can inflate itself as a defensive measure.

== Taxonomy ==
The painted swellshark was initially identified with the Australian Cephaloscyllium "sp. E", now known to consist of the flagtail swellshark (C. signourum) and the speckled swellshark (C. speccum), because of their similar variegated color patterns. Genetic data showed this shark to be distinct from the two Australian species, and it was described in a 2008 Commonwealth Scientific and Industrial Research Organisation (CSIRO) publication by Peter Last, Bernard Séret, and William White. Its specific epithet is derived from the Latin pictus, meaning "painted". The type specimen is a 65 cm (26 in) long adult male obtained at Lombok, Indonesia.

== Distribution and habitat ==
The painted swellshark is found in eastern Indonesia and Timor-Leste, though its exact range and habitat is uncertain. The first live video footage of the species was captured by deep-sea cameras on 17–18 November 2024 at two sites off the coast of Dili, Timor-Leste. Two sharks were recorded at depths of 570 m (1,870 ft) and 536 m (1,759 ft), the habitat at both sites consisting of steep rocky slopes.

The Timor-Leste sightings, the first known observation of the painted swellshark in the wild, extend the species' known range by more than 1,100 km (680 mi). Previously, five specimens were collected from fish markets in eastern Indonesia—four from Bali in 2002, and a fifth from Tanjung Luar in Lombok on 12 July 2004.

== Description ==
A stout-bodied species reaching 72 cm (28 in) in length, the painted swellshark has a short, broad, strongly flattened head with a blunt snout. The slit-like eyes are placed high on the head and are followed by tiny spiracles. The nostrils are preceded by a laterally enlarged flaps of skin that do not reach the mouth, which is long and narrow without furrows at the corners. There are 58–78 upper tooth rows and 59–77 lower tooth rows. Each tooth has 3–5 cusps, with the central cusp the longest; the teeth of adult males are longer than those of females. The upper teeth are exposed when the mouth is closed. The fourth and fifth pairs of gill slits lie over the pectoral fin bases and are shorter than the first three.

The pectoral fins are small with narrowly rounded tips and nearly straight trailing margins. The first dorsal fin has a narrowed rounded apex and originates over the middle of the pelvic fin bases. The almost triangular second dorsal fin is much smaller and lower than both the first dorsal and the anal fins, originating behind the anal fin origin. The pelvic fins are small, with short and elongated claspers in males. The caudal fin has a distinct lower lobe and a strong ventral notch near the tip of the upper lobe. The dermal denticles are widely spaced, highly variable in size, and have 1–3 ridges and cusps. This shark is a dark gray above, with faint blackish saddles mostly broken up into irregular blotches, and a smattering of lighter spots. There are also blackish bars below the eyes, over the gills and pelvic fins, and on the upper caudal fin lobe before the ventral notch. The underside is pale with many gray blotches, and black and white speckling on the snout; the demarcation between the dorsal and ventral coloration is irregular but abrupt. Juveniles are unknown, though both Australian variegated swellsharks have very differently colored young.

== Biology and ecology ==
There is scant natural history information on the painted swellshark. Like other Cephaloscyllium species, it is capable of taking in water or air to increase its girth when threatened. In males, sexual maturity is attained under a length of 58 cm (23 in).

== Conservation status ==
The conservation status of the painted swellshark has not been evaluated by the International Union for Conservation of Nature (IUCN). This species is categorized as "Data Deficient" on the IUCN Red List due to limited available information.
