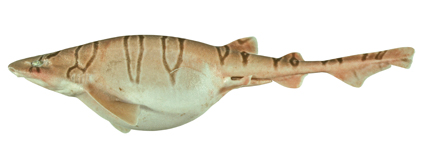

Conservation status
- Least Concern (IUCN 3.1)

Scientific classification
- Kingdom: Animalia
- Phylum: Chordata
- Class: Chondrichthyes
- Subclass: Elasmobranchii
- Division: Selachii
- Order: Carcharhiniformes
- Family: Scyliorhinidae
- Genus: Cephaloscyllium
- Species: C. hiscosellum

Binomial name
- Cephaloscyllium hiscosellum W. T. White & Ebert, 2008

= Australian reticulate swellshark =

Species of shark

The Australian reticulate swellshark (Cephaloscyllium hiscosellum) is a little-known species of catshark in the family Scyliorhinidae. It is found off the coast of northwestern Australia at depths of 290–420 m (950–1,380 ft). This shark has a stocky body and a short, wide head with a capacious mouth. It is characterized by a striking dorsal color pattern of dark brown lines that trace a series of hollow saddles and narrow rings, on a light background. Like other swellsharks, this species can inflate itself when threatened. Its reproduction is oviparous.

== Taxonomy ==
Once thought to be the same species as the reticulated swellshark (C. fasciatum) of Vietnam and Hainan, the Australian reticulate swellshark was described as a separate species by William White and David Ebert in a 2008 Commonwealth Scientific and Industrial Research Organisation (CSIRO) publication. Its specific epithet hiscosellum is derived from the Latin hisco meaning "open", and sella meaning "saddle", referring to its distinctive color pattern. The type specimen is a 46 cm (18 in) long adult male caught west of Leander Point, Western Australia.

== Description ==
Male and female Australian reticulate swellsharks are known to attain lengths of 46 cm (18 in) and 52 cm (20 in) respectively. This species has a stocky body and a short, broad, and strongly flattened head. The snout is broadly rounded, with the nostrils preceded by laterally expanded skin flaps that do not reach the mouth. The slit-like eyes are placed high on the head, and are followed by tiny spiracles. The mouth is long, wide, and strongly arched, without furrows at the corners; the upper teeth are exposed when the mouth is closed. There are 49–63 upper tooth rows and 45–60 lower tooth rows. Females have much smaller teeth than males of comparable size; each tooth has three cusps and rarely 1–2 additional lateral cusplets. The fourth and fifth pairs of gill slits lie over the pectoral fin bases and are shorter than the first three.

The pectoral fins are fairly small, narrow, and angular. The pelvic fins are small, with long, elongate claspers in males. The first dorsal fin has a rounded apex and originates over the posterior half of the pelvic fin bases. The second dorsal fin is much smaller and roughly triangular. The rounded to angular anal fin is substantially larger than, and placed slightly behind, the second dorsal fin. The caudal fin is moderately large, with a distinct lower lobe and a strong ventral notch near the tip of the upper lobe. The dermal denticles are tiny and arrowhead-shaped, with a median ridge in males and both median and lateral ridges in females. This shark is light grayish to brownish above, with narrow dark lines that form a series of open-centered saddles and narrow rings from the head to the tail; some individuals have small, scattered yellow spots or a dark ring or spot atop each pectoral fin. The underside is a uniform beige.

== Distribution and habitat ==
The range of the Australian reticulate swellshark is limited to the upper continental slope off northwestern Australia, between Geraldton and Broome. It occurs at a depth of 290–420 m (950–1,380 ft).

== Biology and ecology ==
Little is known of the natural history of the Australian reticulate swellshark. Like other members of its genus, this species can inflate itself with water or air as a defensive measure. The eggs of this oviparous species are contained in smooth, light yellow flask-shaped capsules, which have a flanged margin and horns at the corners that support long, coiled tendrils. The hatchlings seem to lack the specialized denticle used by other swellsharks to break out of the egg case. Males mature sexually between a length of 39–46 cm (15–18 in).

== Human interactions ==
The International Union for Conservation of Nature (IUCN) has identified minimal threats the Australian reticulate swellshark, and thus classifying it as "data deficient."
