= Balloon shark =

Conservation status
- Near Threatened (IUCN 3.1)

Scientific classification
- Kingdom: Animalia
- Phylum: Chordata
- Class: Chondrichthyes
- Subclass: Elasmobranchii
- Division: Selachii
- Order: Carcharhiniformes
- Family: Scyliorhinidae
- Genus: Cephaloscyllium
- Species: C. sufflans

Binomial name
- Cephaloscyllium sufflans (Regan, 1921)
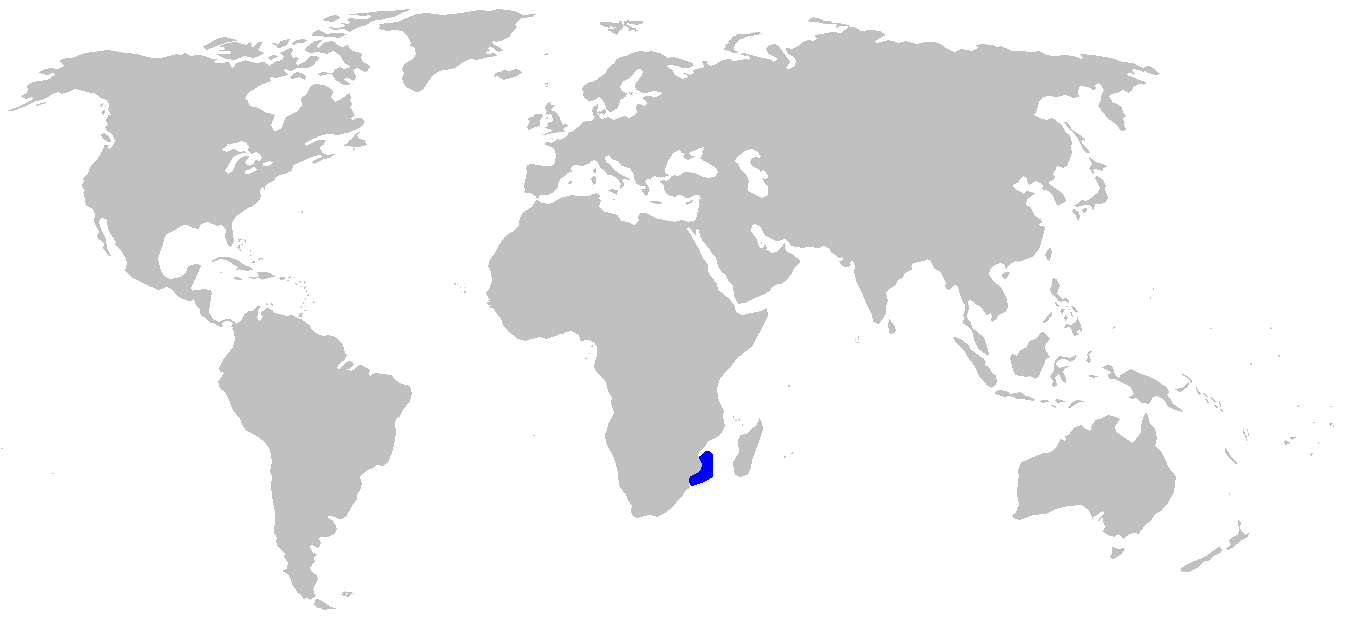
- Range of the balloon shark

Synonyms
- Scyliorhinus sufflans Regan, 1921

Species of shark

The balloon shark (Cephaloscyllium sufflans) is a species of catshark, and part of the family Scyliorhinidae, endemic to the southwestern Indian Ocean off South Africa and Mozambique. Benthic in nature, it is found over sandy and muddy flats at depths of 40–600 m (130–1,970 ft). This thick-bodied species has a broad, flattened head and a short tail; its distinguishing traits include narrow, lobe-like skin flaps in front of the nostrils, and a dorsal color pattern of faint darker saddles on a light grayish background.

Befitting its common name, the balloon shark can inflate itself with water or air as a defense against predators. It feeds on a variety of crustaceans, cephalopods, and fishes. Reproduction is oviparous, with females producing egg cases two at a time. This species is caught incidentally in bottom trawls but does not seem to be threatened by fishing pressure, hence its assessment as near threatened by the International Union for Conservation of Nature (IUCN).

== Taxonomy ==
British ichthyologist Charles Tate Regan described the balloon shark as Scyliorhinus sufflans in a 1921 issue of the scientific journal Annals and Magazine of Natural History. He placed the species within the subgenus Cephaloscyllium, which later authors have elevated to the rank of full genus. The type specimen measures 75 cm (30 in) long and was collected 24–35 km (15–22 mi) away from the mouth of the Umvoti River in South Africa.

== Distribution and habitat ==
The range of the balloon shark is likely restricted to the waters off the South African province of KwaZulu-Natal and Mozambique. Additional records from the Gulf of Aden and off Vietnam appear to represent different, yet-undescribed species. This common, bottom-dwelling shark inhabits the continental shelf and upper continental slope, at depths of 40–600 m (130–1,970 ft). It favors sandy and muddy substrates. There appears to be geographical and/or depth segregation by age: generally only juveniles are found off KwaZulu-Natal at depths of 40–440 m (130–1,440 ft), suggesting that most adults may be found in deeper and/or more northerly waters.

== Description ==
Reaching 1.1 m (3.6 ft) long, the balloon shark has a stout, firm body and a broad, flattened head. The snout is short and rounded, with each nostril divided by a narrow lobe on its anterior rim. The horizontally oval eyes are equipped with rudimentary nictitating membranes (protective third eyelids) and placed rather high on the head. Above and below each eye are ridges, and behind is a small spiracle. The capacious mouth forms a wide arch and lacks furrows at the corners; the upper teeth are exposed when the mouth is closed. There are around 60 upper and 44 lower tooth rows; each tooth has a strong central cusp flanked on either side by 1–2 tiny cusplets. Of the five pairs of gill slits, the third pair is the longest.

The first dorsal fin is positioned about opposite the pelvic fins; the second dorsal fin is much smaller and placed opposite the anal fin. The pectoral fins are large and broad. The pelvic fins are low; adult males have rather short, thick claspers. The anal fin is smaller than the first dorsal fin but much larger than the second, and is relatively deep. The tail is short, with a deep caudal fin that bears a small lower lobe and a ventral notch near the tip of the upper lobe. The skin is thick and roughened by well-calcified dermal denticles; each denticle is triangular and pointed. This species is light grayish brown to purplish above, including the upper surface of the pectoral fins, and paler below. A series of 6–7 faint darker saddles are present along the back and tail, which are more obvious in younger sharks. The fins lack obvious lighter margins.

== Biology and ecology ==
Like other members of its genus, the balloon shark is capable of greatly inflating its stomach with water or air as a defense mechanism. A juvenile 48 cm (19 in) long has been found in the stomach of a coelacanth (Latimeria chalumnae). The diet of the balloon shark consists mainly of lobsters, shrimps, and cephalopods, while bony fishes and other elasmobranchs may also be consumed. It is oviparous, with females producing encapsulated eggs two at a time, one per oviduct. Deposited eggs have yet to be recovered, implying that spawning occurs in deeper and/or more northerly waters that are frequented by the adults. Young sharks hatch at roughly 20–22 cm (7.9–8.7 in) long; both sexes mature at approximately 70–75 cm (28–30 in) long.

== Human interactions ==
The balloon shark has almost no economic value, though the skin may be utilized. It is regularly caught incidentally and discarded by commercial bottom trawlers operating in parts of its range, though its population does not yet appear to have been negatively impacted. As a result, the International Union for Conservation of Nature (IUCN) has listed this shark under near threatened, while recommending that relevant fisheries be carefully monitored.
