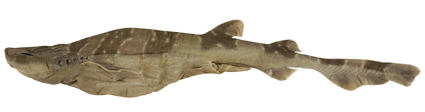

Conservation status
- Data Deficient (IUCN 3.1)

Scientific classification
- Kingdom: Animalia
- Phylum: Chordata
- Class: Chondrichthyes
- Subclass: Elasmobranchii
- Division: Selachii
- Order: Carcharhiniformes
- Family: Scyliorhinidae
- Genus: Cephaloscyllium
- Species: C. cooki

Binomial name
- Cephaloscyllium cooki Last, Séret & W. T. White, 2008

= Cook's swellshark =

Species of shark

The Cook's swellshark (Cephaloscyllium cooki) is a little-known species of catshark, belonging to the family Scyliorhinidae. This shark is found in the Arafura Sea at a depth of 223–300 m (732–984 ft). It is a stocky-bodied shark with a short, broad head and a large mouth, and can be identified by the eight dark, pale-edged saddles along its grayish brown body and tail. The maximum known length of this species is 30 cm (12 in). Like other swellsharks, it can inflate itself with water or air when threatened.

== Taxonomy ==
The Cook's swellshark was described by Peter Last, Bernard Séret, and William White in a 2008 Commonwealth Scientific and Industrial Research Organisation (CSIRO) publication. It is named in honor of the late shark fishery biologist and conservationist Sid Cook. The type specimen is a 29 cm (11 in) long adult male collected from the Arafura Sea.

== Description ==
A small species growing to 30 cm (12 in) long, the Cook's swellshark has a stocky body and a short, broad head. The snout is flattened and rounded, with the nostrils preceded by laterally enlarged flaps of skin that do not reach the mouth. The slit-like eyes are positioned high on the head and followed by tiny spiracles. The long, narrow mouth lacks furrows at the corners and contains 50–61 tooth rows in the upper jaw and 49–62 tooth rows in the lower jaw; each tooth has a long central cusp and a pair of smaller lateral cusps. The upper teeth are exposed when the mouth is closed. The fourth and fifth pairs of gill slits lie over the pectoral fin bases and are shorter than the first three.

The pectoral fins are rather small and angular, with nearly straight trailing margins. The two dorsal fins have rounded apices; the first is much larger and taller than the second, originating over the back half of the pelvic fin bases, while the second is positioned opposite the similarly shaped but slightly larger anal fin. The pelvic fins are small and angular; males have very long claspers. The caudal fin is low, with a distinct lower lobe and a strong ventral notch near the tip of the upper lobe. The dermal denticles are widely spaced, with three points and a median ridge. The dorsal coloration is distinctive, consisting of a grayish brown background with six pale-edged dark saddles along the body and two on the tail. The first saddle is curved forward, with its front edge intersecting each eye. There are pale dots on the snout and fins, and inside the saddles on the body. On the flanks, the dorsal coloration fades into the plain light gray of the underside.

== Distribution and habitat ==
The Cook's swellshark is only found in the Arafura Sea, from the Northern Territory of Australia to the Tanimbar Islands of Indonesia. It resides in water 223–300 m (732–984 ft) deep.

== Biology and ecology ==
Like other Cephaloscyllium species, the Cook's swellshark is capable of inflating itself as a defensive measure. Almost nothing is known of its natural history.

== Human interactions ==
The conservation status of the Cook's swellshark has not been evaluated by the International Union for Conservation of Nature (IUCN).
