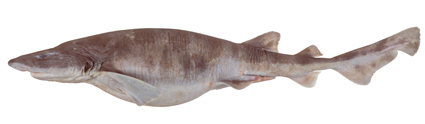

Conservation status
- Near Threatened (IUCN 3.1)

Scientific classification
- Kingdom: Animalia
- Phylum: Chordata
- Class: Chondrichthyes
- Subclass: Elasmobranchii
- Division: Selachii
- Order: Carcharhiniformes
- Family: Scyliorhinidae
- Genus: Cephaloscyllium
- Species: C. variegatum

Binomial name
- Cephaloscyllium variegatum Last & W. T. White, 2008

= Saddled swellshark =

Species of shark

The saddled swellshark (Cephaloscyllium variegatum) is a rare species of catshark, and part of the family Scyliorhinidae, endemic to Eastern Australia. This bottom-dwelling species is found on the outer continental shelf and upper continental slope at a depth of 115–605 m (377–1,985 ft). It is a robustly built shark with a short, broad, flattened head and a capacious mouth. Adults are patterned with saddles on a brownish or grayish background, which varies between tropical and temperate sharks; juveniles are light-colored with many spots. This shark reaches 74 cm (29 in) in length. Like other swellsharks, it can inflate itself as a defensive measure. Reproduction is oviparous.

== Taxonomy ==
In 1994, Commonwealth Scientific and Industrial Research Organisation (CSIRO) chief researchers Peter Last and John Stevens recognized five undescribed swellsharks in Australian waters. Later investigation revealed that the forms provisionally named Cephaloscyllium "sp. B" and "sp. C" may represent clinal variants of a single species, which was described by Peter Last and William White in a 2008 CSIRO publication. The specific epithet variegatum comes from the Latin word for "various", and refers to the large amount of color variation within this species. The type specimen is 68 cm (27 in) long adult male, collected from east of Newcastle, New South Wales.

== Description ==
The saddled swellshark reaches a maximum known length of 74 cm (29 in). It has a moderately stocky body and a short, variably wide, and strongly flattened head. The snout is broadly rounded, with the nostrils preceded by laterally expanded flaps of skin that do not reach the large mouth. The slit-like eyes are positioned high on the head and followed by tiny spiracles. The tooth rows number 68–82 in the upper jaw and 68–80 in the lower jaw. The very small teeth have three cusps, with the central one the longest and sometimes 1–2 additional lateral cusplets. In females the central cusp is smaller than in males. There are no furrows at the corners of the mouth, and the upper teeth are exposed when the mouth is closed. The fourth and fifth gill slits lie over the pectoral fin bases and are shorter than the first three.

The pectoral fins are large and broad, with rounded margins. The first dorsal fin is fairly angular and originates over the middle of the pelvic fin bases. The second dorsal fin is much smaller and lower than the first, originating behind the anal fin origin. The pelvic fins are small, with elongate, relatively short claspers in males. The anal fin is substantially larger and deeper than the second dorsal fin. The caudal fin is deep, with a distinct lower lobe and a strong ventral notch near the tip of the upper lobe. The body is densely covered by minute dermal denticles, each shaped like an arrowhead and bearing a median ridge.

The saddled swellshark is brownish or grayish in color above, with 11 darker saddles of varying width over the body and tail and usually no blotches on the flanks. Individuals from tropical waters ("sp. B") tend to have more defined saddles, while those from temperate waters ("sp. C") have fainter saddles and a smattering of lighter flecks. The underside is a plain light color, often with a few darker marks. The juveniles are pale with many dark brown spots.

== Distribution and habitat ==
The saddled swellshark is found off the eastern coast of Australia, as far north as Rockingham Bay in Queensland and as far south as Tathra in New South Wales, and perhaps also the Britannia Seamount near Brisbane. It is a bottom-dwelling species that inhabits the outer continental shelf and upper continental slope at a depth of 115–605 m (377–1,985 ft).

== Biology and ecology ==
Like other members of its genus, the variegated swellshark can inflate itself with water or air as a defensive measure. This species is oviparous, with its eggs contained in smooth, brownish capsules about 7 cm (2.8 in) long. The egg capsule is thick and rounded, with flanged lateral margins and a pair of horns at each end, which support very long, coiled tendrils. The smallest known free-swimming specimen measured 17 cm (6.7 in) long; males mature sexually at a length of 55–60 cm (22–24 in).

== Human interactions ==
The International Union for Conservation of Nature (IUCN) has listed the saddled swellshark under Near Threatened until more information is available. Currently, little fishing occurs in the region where this shark is found, but should that change it may be vulnerable due to its apparent rarity and benthic habits.
