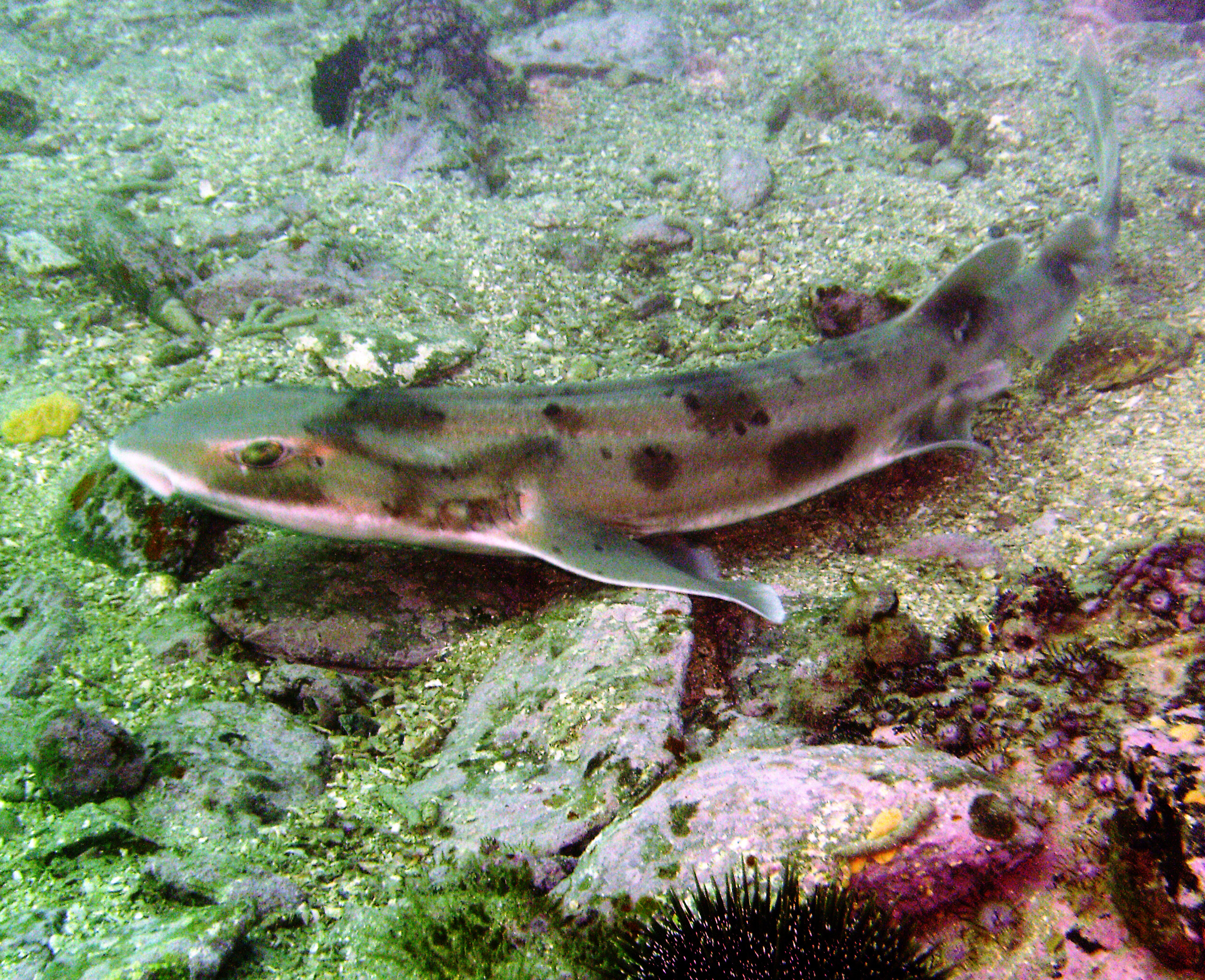

Conservation status
- Least Concern (IUCN 3.1)

Scientific classification
- Kingdom: Animalia
- Phylum: Chordata
- Class: Chondrichthyes
- Subclass: Elasmobranchii
- Division: Selachii
- Order: Carcharhiniformes
- Family: Scyliorhinidae
- Genus: Cephaloscyllium
- Species: C. isabellum

Binomial name
- Cephaloscyllium isabellum (Bonnaterre, 1788)
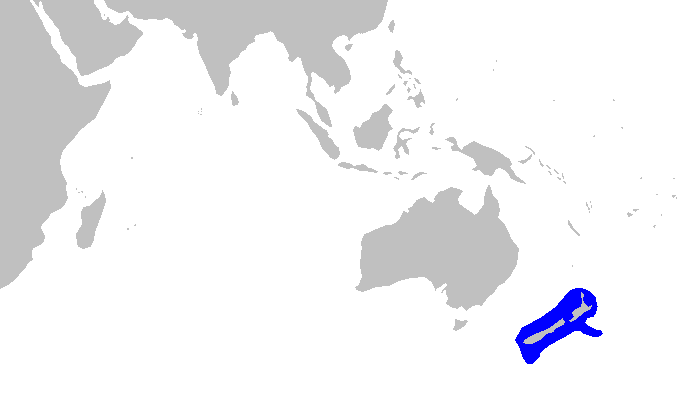
- Range of the draughtsboard shark

Synonyms
- Scyllium lima Richardson, 1843; Squalus isabella Bonnaterre, 1788; Squalus isabella Gmelin, 1789

= Draughtsboard shark =

Species of shark

The draughtsboard shark (Cephaloscyllium isabellum; Māori: pekapeka) is a species of catshark, and part of the family Scyliorhinidae, so named for its "checkerboard" colour pattern of dark blotches. It is endemic to New Zealand, where it is also known as the carpet shark (which usually refers to the entire order Orectolobiformes; also spelt carpertshark). This shark typically reaches 1 m (3.3 ft) in length and has a thick body with a broad, flattened head and a capacious mouth. Its two dorsal fins are placed far back on the body, with the first much larger than the second.

Occurring down to a depth of 673 m (2,208 ft), the draughtsboard shark frequents rocky reefs during the day and sandy flats at night. Its diet consists of fishes and invertebrates. When threatened by a predator, it can take water or air into its body to inflate its body, which may be the cause of its unusual habit of barking like a dog. This species is oviparous, with females laying smooth, tendril-bearing egg capsules in pairs. Draughtsboard sharks are often taken as bycatch by commercial fisheries, but are probably hardy enough to survive the experience. The International Union for Conservation of Nature (IUCN) has listed this species under Least Concern.

== Taxonomy ==
French naturalist Pierre Joseph Bonnaterre originally described the draughtsboard shark as Squalus isabella, in the 1788 ichthyology volume of the Tableau encyclopédique et méthodique des trois règnes de la nature. He based his account on "L'Isabelle", referred to by Pierre-Marie-Auguste Broussonet in a 1780 Histoire de l'Académie Royale des Sciences paper. The type specimen has since been lost. Later authors moved this species to the genus Cephaloscyllium.

The draughtsboard shark closely resembles the blotchy swellshark (C. umbratile) and the Australian swellshark (C. laticeps), both of which have been suspected to be the same species as C. isabellum by different authors at various times. The draughtsboard shark differs from the Australian swellshark in colouration and the form of its egg capsules (smooth in C. isabellum and ridged in C. laticeps). It differs from the blotchy swellshark in colouration and morphometric measurements.

== Distribution and habitat ==
The draughtsboard shark is found in the coastal waters around Tasmania, New Zealand, including the Snares, the Chatham Islands, and Stewart Island, where it is particularly common. It typically occurs at depths of 0 to 400 m (0 to 1,312 ft) on continental and insular shelves, though it has been recorded from as far down as 673 m (2,208 ft). This shark is a bottom-dweller that favours rocky reefs and adjacent areas of soft substrate. Adult males and females segregate from each other.

== Description ==
Most draughtsboard sharks measure no more than 1 m (3.3 ft) long, though rarely an individual may reach 1.5 m (4.9 ft); a recorded maximum size of 2.4 m (7.9 ft) was probably based on the broadnose sevengill shark (Notorynchus cepedianus) or some other species. Females grow larger than males. This shark has a stocky, spindle-shaped body that tapers to a relatively thin caudal peduncle. The head is short, broad, and somewhat flattened, with a broadly rounded snout. The nostrils have a triangular flap of skin in front, that do not reach the mouth. The oval eyes have rudimentary nictitating eyelids and are placed somewhat on top of the head; they have thick ridges above and below, and are followed by spiracles. The mouth is very large and curved, without furrows at the corners and with the upper teeth exposed when closed.

The pectoral fins are fairly large and broad. The two dorsal fins are placed far back on the body, with the first originating about over the middle of the pelvic fin bases and the second originating over the anal fin. The second dorsal fin is much smaller than the first, and also smaller than the anal fin. Males have short and thick claspers. The caudal fin is short and broad, with a barely developed lower lobe and a strong ventral notch near the tip of the upper lobe. The skin is thick and covered by well-calcified dermal denticles. The colouration of the draughtsboard shark gives it its common name: it is golden to brown above and light below, with up to 11 dark brown, irregular dorsal "saddles" that alternate with blotches on its flanks to form a checkerboard pattern. Also distinctive is the saddle between its spiracles, which is stretched out and swept back on each side to form a bar over the gill slits.

== Biology and ecology ==
During the day, the draughtsboard shark is lethargic and typically hides inside crevices or caves on the reef. At night, it emerges to forage for food over nearby sandy flats. This shark consumes a wide variety of fishes and invertebrates, including spiny dogfish, cod, sand perch, blennies, octopus, squid, gastropods, innkeeper worms, krill, hermit crabs, crabs, spiny lobsters, and even sea squirts. Individuals have been observed sucking innkeeper worms out of their burrows, and swimming around with the antennae of large lobsters sticking out of their mouths for hours. A known parasite of this species is the tapeworm Calyptrobothrium chalarosomum.

Like other Cephaloscyllium species, the draughtsboard shark has the ability to inflate its body dramatically in response to a predator; this defence mechanism may be behind reports of this species barking like a large dog. While it usually inflates with water, when captured by humans and brought to the surface it may inflate with air instead. When the shark deflates, the "bark" is produced by the pressurised air as it is released explosively through the cardiac sphincter of the stomach. This species is oviparous, with females laying two eggs at a time. The smooth, cream-coloured egg cases measure 12 cm (4.7 in) long, and have long, spiral tendrils at the corners that allow them to be fastened to underwater objects. Newly hatched sharks measure 16 cm (6.3 in) long; males and females mature sexually at 60 cm (24 in) and 80 cm (31 in) long respectively.

== Human interactions ==
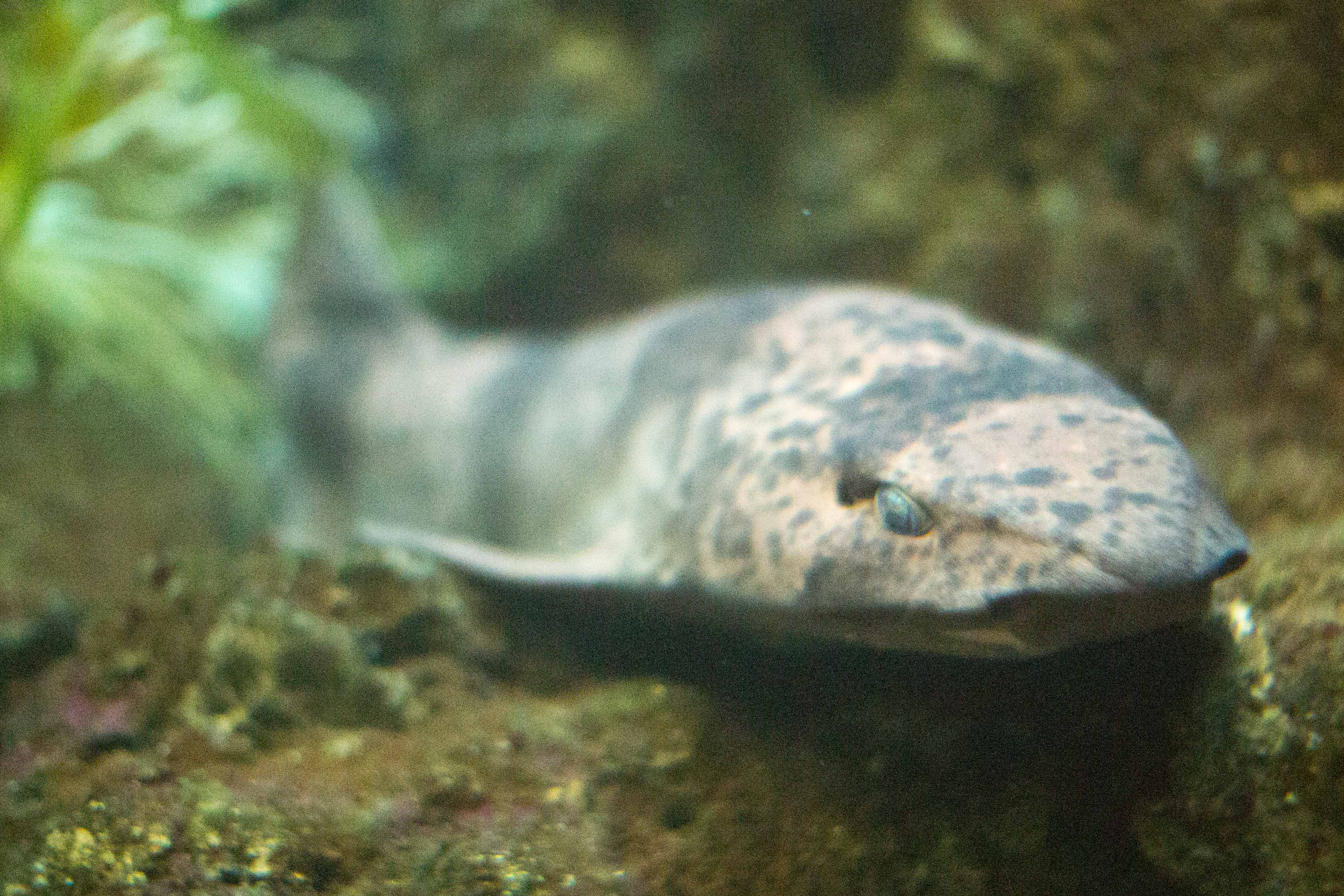
Draughtsboard shark at the Shedd Aquarium

Common and harmless, draughtsboard sharks are often caught incidentally by trawl, rock lobster, and probably set net fisheries. It is likely that most captured sharks survive to be returned to the water alive, as this species can tolerate being out of water for an extended period of time. From 1988 to 1991, there was a New Zealand shark liver fishery and reported catches of draughtsboard sharks were 74–540 tons per year. After the fishery was discontinued, catches dropped to under five tons per year.

== Conservation status ==
The New Zealand Department of Conservation has classified the draughtsboard shark as "Not Threatened" under the New Zealand Threat Classification System. Because its population seems healthy and free from significant threats, the International Union for Conservation of Nature (IUCN) has assessed this species as of Least Concern.
