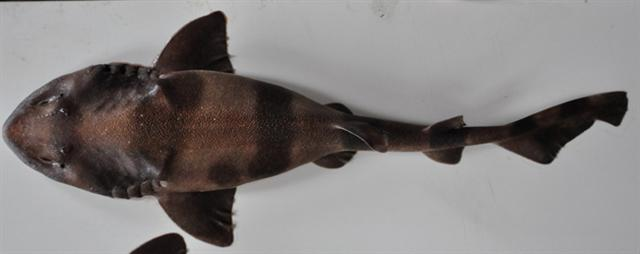

Conservation status
- Critically Endangered (IUCN 3.1)

Scientific classification
- Kingdom: Animalia
- Phylum: Chordata
- Class: Chondrichthyes
- Subclass: Elasmobranchii
- Division: Selachii
- Order: Carcharhiniformes
- Family: Scyliorhinidae
- Genus: Cephaloscyllium
- Species: C. silasi

Binomial name
- Cephaloscyllium silasi (Talwar, 1974)
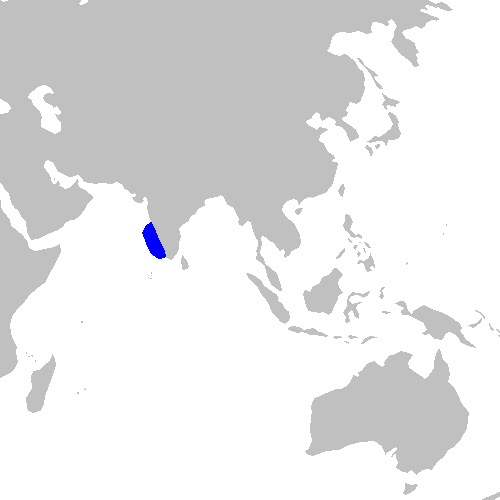
- Range of the Indian swellshark

= Indian swellshark =

Species of shark

The Indian swellshark (Cephaloscyllium silasi) is a catshark of the family Scyliorhinidae found in the western Indian Ocean near Quilon, India and Sauqira Bay, Oman. Specimens caught as bycatch near North Sentinel Island of the Andaman and Nicobar Islands have been genetically identified as Indian swellsharks, expanding its known range to the Andaman Sea. It grows to about 36 cm in length, and can expand its body by taking in air or water to make it appear larger to predators.

The shark is considered to be critically endangered. It is threatened by fishing pressure as it is caught incidentally by deep-water trawling practices, which occur throughout its entire known range.

== Etymology ==
Cephaloscyllium comes from the words cephalus, meaning head (from the Greek kephalḗ), and scyllium, meaning small dog (from the Greek skýlion). The specific name, silasi, was given in honour of Sri Lankan-born Indian ichthyologist Eric Godwin Silas.

== Description ==
The Indian swellshark has a light brown dorsal surface striped with seven dark brown bands, and a pale brown underside. Juvenile sharks appear light brown, similar to the adult but more faded in colour. They have a flat, rounded head, a stout body, five gill slits, and slit-like eyes.

Suspected to be a 'dwarf' species of Cephaloscyllium, the Indian swellshark is estimated to reach a maximum of 50.0 cm in total length. Length at maturity of males is reported as 36.7 cm, while an examined female was measured to be 45.0 cm long.

== Biology ==
The Indian swellshark is a single oviparous species. The egg case is described as of medium length (85.1–86.2 mm) with long, convoluted tendrils on the posterior and anterior sides. An examined gravid female carried one egg case in each uterus, containing visible embryos.

A study on the Sarawak pygmy swellshark revealed that the shark has a unique reproductive mechanism termed "sustained single oviparity", wherein pregnant females always have a singular egg case, and retain it until a certain stage of embryonic development. A comparison with the studied female Indian swellshark suggests that the species may exhibit the same reproductive mechanism, based on the presence of a single embryo in each oviduct and the relatively advanced size of such.

== Ecology ==
The Indian swellshark is a marine, bathydemersal shark, found on the continental slope at a depth range of 100–500 m.

The examined stomach of an Indian swellshark contained crustaceans and cephalopods.
