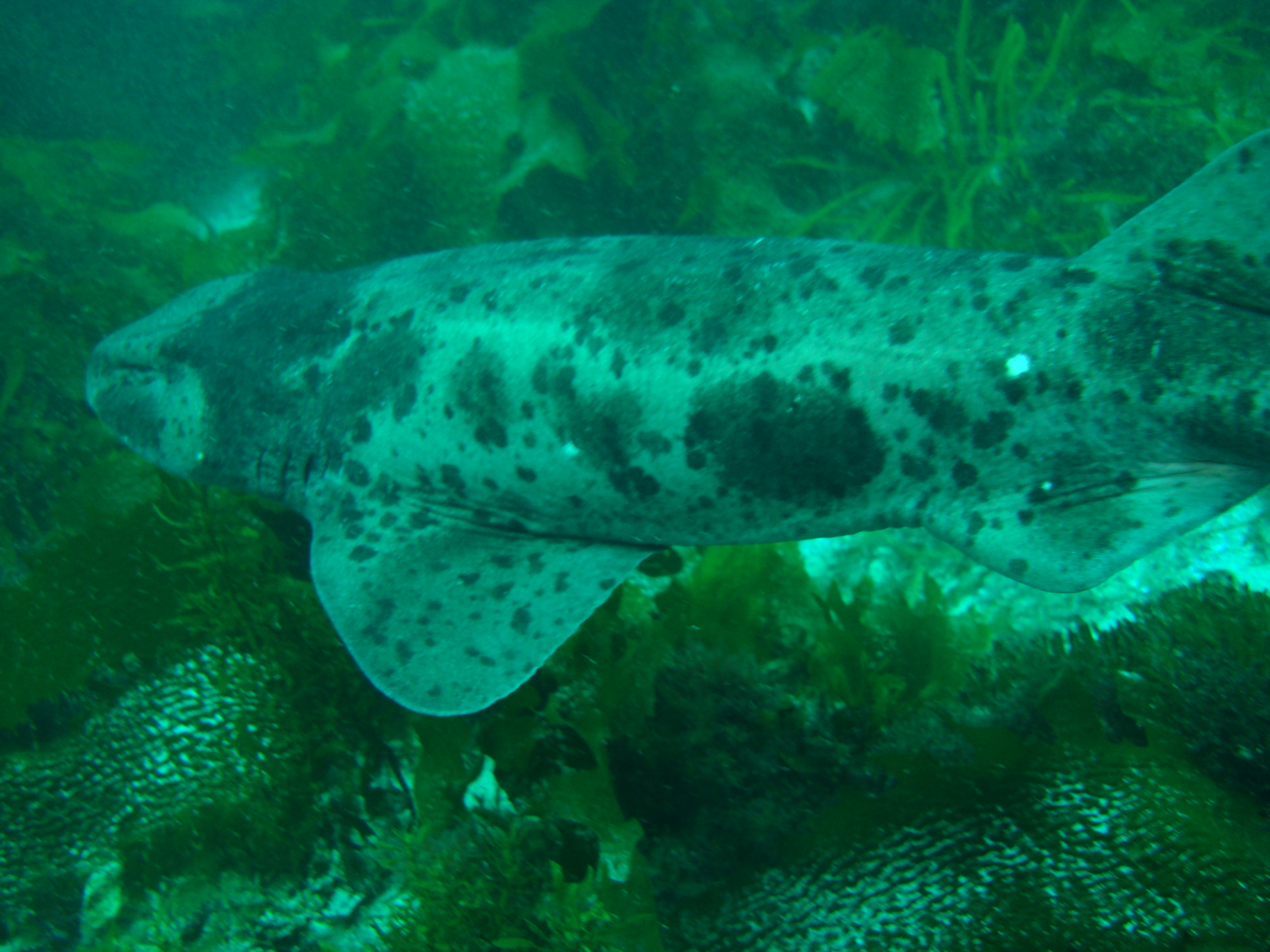
- Australian swellshark (C. laticeps)

Scientific classification
- Kingdom: Animalia
- Phylum: Chordata
- Class: Chondrichthyes
- Subclass: Elasmobranchii
- Division: Selachii
- Order: Carcharhiniformes
- Family: Scyliorhinidae
- Genus: Cephaloscyllium; T. N. Gill, 1862

Type species
- Scyllium laticeps A. H. A. Duméril 1853

= Cephaloscyllium =

Cephaloscyllium Temporal range: Miocene–Present

Genus of fishes

Cephaloscyllium is a genus of catsharks, and part of the family Scyliorhinidae, commonly known as swellsharks because of their ability to inflate their bodies with water or air as a defense against predators. These sluggish, bottom-dwelling sharks are found widely in the tropical and temperate coastal waters of the Indian and Pacific Oceans. They have stocky, spindle-shaped bodies and short, broad, and flattened heads. The mouth is capacious, containing many small teeth and lacking furrows at the corners. The two dorsal fins are placed far back on the body, with the first much larger than the second. Different species have various color patterns of saddles, blotches, reticulations, and/or spots. The largest members of the genus can grow over 1 m (3.3 ft) in length. Swellsharks prey on a variety of fishes and invertebrates, and are oviparous, with females producing egg capsules in pairs. They are harmless and have been deemed of having no commercial value.

== Taxonomy ==
The genus Cephaloscyllium was proposed by American ichthyologist Theodore Gill from the Greek kephale ("head") and skylion ("dogfish"), in an 1862 issue of Annals of the Lyceum of Natural History of New York. However, most of Gill's contemporaries, particularly those in Europe, preferred to keep the swellsharks within the genus Scyllium (a synonym of Scyliorhinus). Cephaloscyllium did not gain wide acceptance until Samuel Garman published "The Plagiostomia" in a 1913 volume of Memoirs of the Museum of Comparative Zoology, in which he recognized three species: C. isabellum, C. ventriosum, and C. umbratile.

A long history of taxonomic confusion exists regarding the species within Cephaloscyllium owing to several factors, including variation in appearance (particularly between juveniles and adults), the existence of multiple undescribed species, a paucity of detailed scientific descriptions and type material, and the use of unreliable characters. Until recently, various authors had recognized five to eight species, along with at least five undescribed species in Australian waters and more in the western central Pacific and the Indian Ocean. In 2008, significant studies were made in resolving the taxonomy of Cephaloscyllium, with a revision of the genus and an increase in the number of described species to 21.

== Description ==
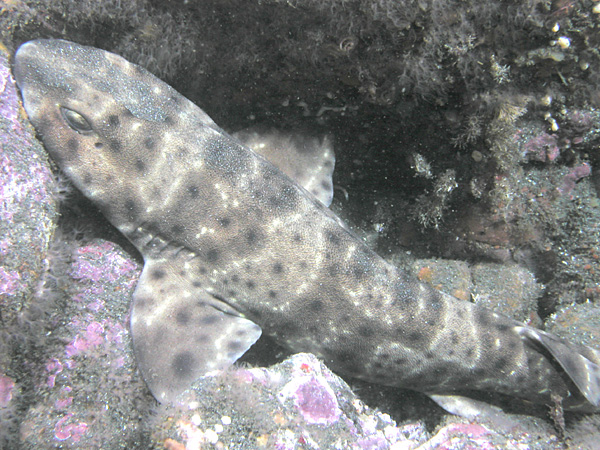
Swellsharks (C. ventriosum) have broad, flattened heads and thick bodies.

Swellsharks are stocky and spindle shaped, with the trunk tapering substantially to the caudal peduncle. The head is short (constituting less than a fifth of the total length), broad, and flattened. The snout is very short and blunt, with the nostrils preceded by laterally enlarged flaps of skin. The eyes are horizontally oval or slit-like and placed high on the head, with cat-like pupils and rudimentary nictitating eyelids. A broad ridge occurs beneath each eye, and a spiracle behind. The mouth is very large and wide, containing numerous small, multicusped teeth; the upper teeth are exposed when the mouth is closed (except in C. silasi). No furrows are found at the corners of the mouth.

The pectoral fins are generally large and broad, while the pelvic fins are small. The two dorsal fins are placed far back on the body: the first dorsal fin originates behind the pelvic fin origins, while the second dorsal fin is positioned about opposite the anal fin. The first dorsal and anal fins are much larger than the second dorsal fin. The tail is short; the caudal fin is broad with a distinct lower lobe and a strong ventral notch near the tip of the upper lobe. The skin is thick and covered by well-calcified dermal denticles. The coloration is typically grayish or brownish, with a variety of patterns that include saddles, blotches, reticulations, and/or spots. In several species, the juveniles differ substantially in coloration from the adults. Cephaloscyllium species generally fall into two size groups: dwarf species include C. fasciatum and C. silasi, which are under 50 cm (20 in) long, and large species include C. umbratile and C. ventriosum, which may exceed 1 m (3.3 ft) in length.

== Distribution and habitat ==
Cephaloscyllium is widely distributed in the Indian and Pacific Oceans, in temperate and tropical waters, but not close to the equator. Swellshark diversity is greatest around Australia and in the west-central Pacific, where multiple endemic species are found. The most far-flung members of the genus are C. sufflans off southeastern Africa, C. silasi off southwestern India, C. umbratile in the northwestern Pacific, and C. ventriosum along the western coast of the Americas. One hypothesis states Cephaloscyllium originally evolved in Australia and New Guinea, and subsequently dispersed outwards in a series of colonization events, eventually reaching Africa and the Americas. Cephaloscyllium species, bottom-dwelling sharks, can be found from the intertidal zone to a depth of 670 m (2,200 ft) on upper continental and insular slopes.

== Biology and ecology ==
Members of the genus Cephaloscyllium are generally slow-moving, sedentary animals with an anguilliform (eel-like) mode of swimming. Of the species whose diets have been documented, they have been known to feed on a wide variety of benthic organisms, including other sharks and rays, bony fishes, crustaceans, and molluscs. Swellsharks are perhaps best known for their ability to inflate themselves by rapidly swallowing water or air when threatened; this behavior may allow them to wedge themselves inside crevices, make themselves harder to swallow, and/or intimidate a would-be predator. Reproduction is oviparous, with females producing two eggs at a time, one in each oviduct. Individual eggs are enclosed in a flask-shaped capsules with tendrils at the corners that allow them to be attached to underwater structures. It has recently been documented that Cephaloscyllium can generate new organisms through parthenogenesis, which is a natural process that allows organisms to reproduce asexually, without fertilization.

== Phylogeny and evolution ==
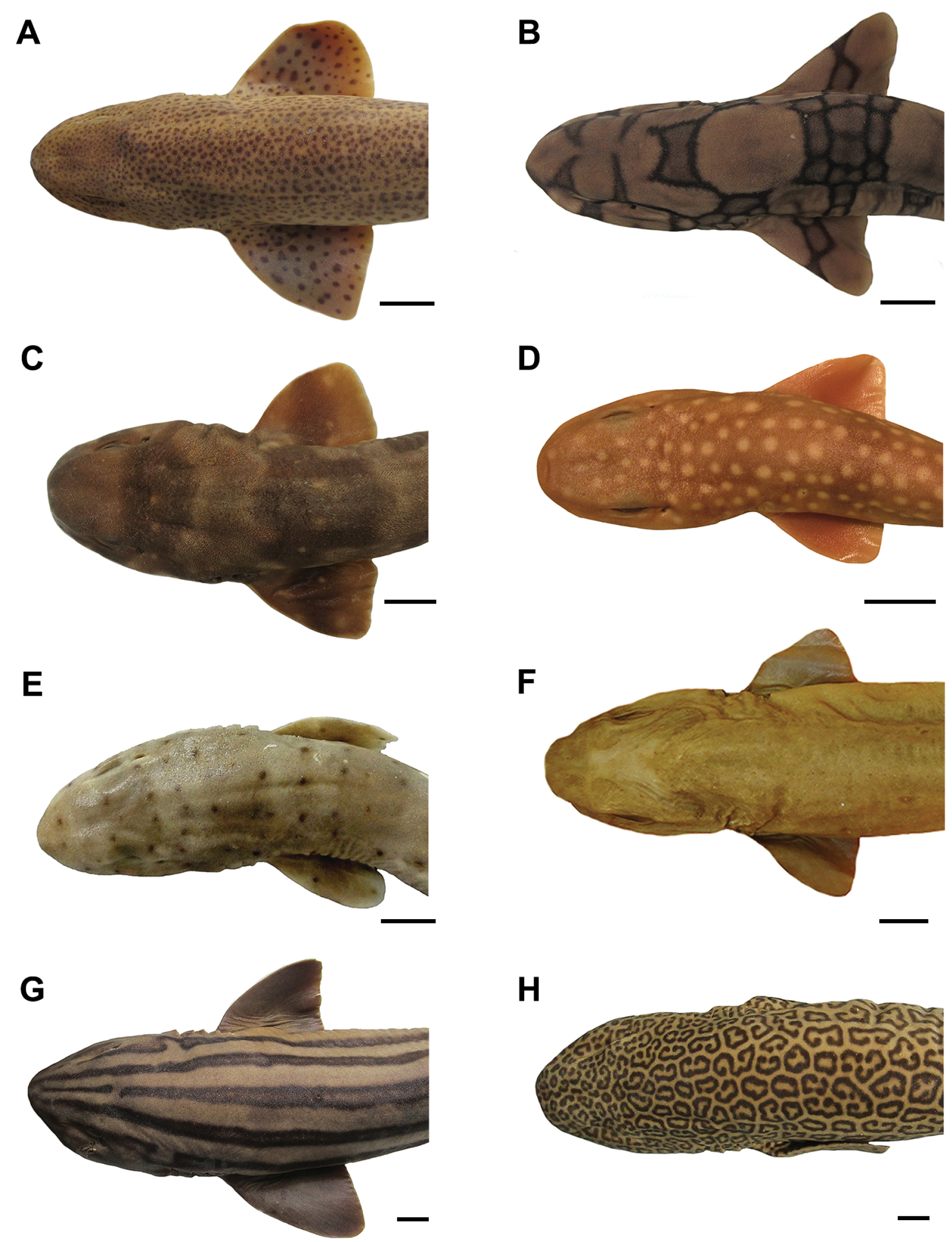
Image to visualize the phylogenetic similarities between Cephaloscyllium species

Morphological and molecular phylogenetic studies have shown the closest relative of Cephaloscyllium to be Scyliorhinus, and these two genera and Poroderma form the subfamily Scyliorhininae, the most basal clade of the order Carcharhiniformes. The oldest confirmed Cephaloscyllium fossils come from Miocene epoch (23–5.3 Mya) deposits in California, though based on the rate of DNA divergence in sharks, the swellshark lineage likely dates back to the Cretaceous period (145.5–65.5 Mya).

== Species ==
There are currently 17 recognized species in this genus:

- Cephaloscyllium albipinnum Last, Motomura & W. T. White, 2008 (whitefin swellshark)
- Cephaloscyllium cooki Last, Séret & W. T. White, 2008 (Cook's swellshark)
- Cephaloscyllium fasciatum W. L. Y. Chan, 1966 (reticulated swellshark)
- Cephaloscyllium hiscosellum W. T. White & Ebert, 2008 (Australian reticulate swellshark)
- Cephaloscyllium isabellum Bonnaterre, 1788 (draughtsboard shark)
- Cephaloscyllium laticeps A. H. A. Duméril, 1853 (Australian swellshark)
- Cephaloscyllium pictum Last, Séret & W. T. White, 2008 (painted swellshark)
- Cephaloscyllium sarawakensis Ka. Yano, A. Ahmad & Gambang, 2005 (Sarawak pygmy swellshark)
- Cephaloscyllium signourum Last, Séret & W. T. White, 2008 (flagtail swellshark)
- Cephaloscyllium silasi Talwar, 1974 (Indian swellshark)
- Cephaloscyllium speccum Last, Séret & W. T. White, 2008 (speckled swellshark)
- Cephaloscyllium stevensi E. Clark & J. E. Randall, 2011 (Steven's swellshark)
- Cephaloscyllium sufflans Regan, 1921 (balloon shark)
- Cephaloscyllium umbratile D. S. Jordan & Fowler, 1903 (blotchy swellshark)
- Cephaloscyllium variegatum Last, Séret & W. T. White, 2008 (saddled swellshark)
- Cephaloscyllium ventriosum Garman, 1880 (swellshark)
- Cephaloscyllium zebrum Last, Séret & W. T. White, 2008 (narrowbar swellshark)
- Cephaloscyllium sp. 1 Not yet described (Philippine swellshark)
- Cephaloscyllium sp. not yet described (tiger swellshark)
- Cephaloscyllium sp. not yet described (New Guinea swellshark)
- Cephaloscyllium sp. not yet described (dwarf balloon shark)
- Cephaloscyllium sp. not yet described (dwarf oriental swellshark)
- Cephaloscyllium sp. not yet described (New Caledonia swellshark)
- Cephaloscyllium sp. not yet described (Red Sea swellshark)

== Human interactions ==
Swellsharks are harmless to humans and generally of no economic value, but are susceptible to being caught as bycatch in artisanal and commercial fisheries. Several species (e.g. C. umbratile and C. ventriosum), are known to be extremely hardy, capable of surviving out of water for extended periods and adapting readily to captivity.
