= Speckled swellshark =

Conservation status
- Data Deficient (IUCN 3.1)

Scientific classification
- Kingdom: Animalia
- Phylum: Chordata
- Class: Chondrichthyes
- Subclass: Elasmobranchii
- Division: Selachii
- Order: Carcharhiniformes
- Family: Scyliorhinidae
- Genus: Cephaloscyllium
- Species: C. speccum

Binomial name
- Cephaloscyllium speccum Last, Séret & W. T. White, 2008

Species of shark

The speckled swellshark (Cephaloscyllium speccum) is a little-known species of catshark, and part of the family Scyliorhinidae, endemic to the waters off northwestern Australia. It occurs on the outer continental shelf and upper continental slope, at a depth of 150–455 m (492–1,493 ft). This species grows to 69 cm (27 in) long and has a stocky body and a short, broad, flattened head. As its common name suggests, its color pattern consists of many dark spots and white-spotted dark saddles and blotches on a light gray background. The juveniles are yellow with dark spots and lines, and a distinctive eyespot-like mark behind each eye. Like other swellsharks, this species can inflate itself as a defensive measure.

== Taxonomy ==
In 1994, Commonwealth Scientific and Industrial Research Organisation (CSIRO) chief researchers Peter Last and John Stevens provisionally gave the name Cephaloscyllium "sp. E" to an undescribed Australian swellshark with a variegated color pattern. Later investigation revealed that "sp. E" in fact constituted two species: the flagtail swellshark (C. signourum) and the speckled swellshark, which was formally described in a 2008 CSIRO publication by Peter Last, Bernard Séret, and William White. Its specific epithet is derived from the Latin specca, meaning "speckled". The type specimen is a 68 cm (27 in) long adult male collected from Rowley Shoals off Western Australia.

== Distribution and habitat ==
The speckled swellshark is found only off Western Australia, from Rowley Shoals to Ashmore Reef. It inhabits the outer continental shelf and upper continental slope at a depth of 150–455 m (492–1,493 ft).

== Description ==
The speckled swellshark attains a maximum known length of 69 cm (27 in). The body is fairly stout and the head is short, wide, and strongly flattened. The snout is blunt, with the nostrils preceded by laterally expanded skin flaps that do not reach the mouth. The slit-like eyes are positioned high on the head and are followed by tiny spiracles. The mouth is long and narrow, without furrows at the corners. The tooth rows number 69–84 in the upper jaw and 74–97 in the lower jaw; the upper teeth are exposed when the mouth is closed. Large sharks have 5-cusped teeth while small sharks have 3-cusped teeth; the central cusp is by far the largest and is longer in adult males than in adult females. The fourth and fifth pairs of gill slits lie over the pectoral fin bases and are shorter than the first three.

The pectoral fins are moderate in size, with somewhat pointed tips and nearly straight trailing margins. The pelvic fins are small, with short claspers in males. The first dorsal fin has a narrowly curved apex, while the second dorsal fin is much smaller and lower. The first dorsal fin origin lies over the rear half of the pelvic fin bases, while the second dorsal fin origin lies slightly behind the anal fin origin. The anal fin resembles the second dorsal fin but is larger and deeper. The caudal fin has a distinct lower lobe and a strong ventral notch near the tip of the upper lobe. The body is densely covered by small, overlapping arrowhead-shaped dermal denticles with a median ridge. Adults are light gray above, with numerous small dark spots interspersed with a series of larger dark saddles and blotches that contain small white spots, including a white-spotted blotch behind and another below each eye. The underside is plain off-white, sometimes with darker or lighter blotches. Juveniles are light yellow with broken brown lines forming rosettes and hollow saddles, including a pair of eyespot-like markings between the spiracles.

== Biology and ecology ==
Like other members of its genus, when threatened the speckled swellshark can take water or air into its stomach to increase its girth. Males mature sexually at under a length of 64 cm (25 in). Only a few specimens have been collected and little is known of its natural history.

== Human interactions ==
The International Union for Conservation of Nature (IUCN) has listed the speckled swellshark under Data Deficient. There is little fishing activity within its range.
