= Flagtail swellshark =

Conservation status
- Data Deficient (IUCN 3.1)

Scientific classification
- Kingdom: Animalia
- Phylum: Chordata
- Class: Chondrichthyes
- Subclass: Elasmobranchii
- Division: Selachii
- Order: Carcharhiniformes
- Family: Scyliorhinidae
- Genus: Cephaloscyllium
- Species: C. signourum

Binomial name
- Cephaloscyllium signourum Last, Séret & W. T. White, 2008

Species of shark

The flagtail swellshark (Cephaloscyllium signourum) is a little-known species of catshark, belonging to the family Scyliorhinidae, found at a depth of 480–700 m (1,570–2,300 ft) off northeastern Queensland, and possibly also nearby islands. This stout-bodied shark has a short, broad, and flattened head with a capacious mouth. Adults have a variegated brown coloration with 9–10 darker dorsal saddles and V-shaped blotch at the tip of the upper caudal fin lobe. Juveniles are yellow with narrow brown bars instead of saddles, and a distinctive marking between the spiracles shaped like two loops connected by a line. Like other swellsharks, this species can inflate its body when threatened.

== Taxonomy ==
In 1994, Commonwealth Scientific and Industrial Research Organisation (CSIRO) chief researchers Peter Last and John Stevens recognized an undescribed Australian swellshark with a variegated color pattern, which they provisionally named Cephaloscyllium "sp. E". Later investigation revealed that "sp. E" in fact constituted two species: the speckled swellshark (C. speccum) and the flagtail swellshark, which was formally described in a 2008 CSIRO publication by Peter Last, Bernard Séret, and William White. In reference to its distinctive caudal fin marking, the shark was given the specific epithet signourum from the Latin signum ("flag") and the Greek oura ("tail"). The type specimen is a 74 cm (29 in) long female collected at the Lihou Reef and Cays, near Queensland.

== Distribution and habitat ==
The flagtail swellshark has been reported from Murray Island and Lihou Reef, off northeastern Queensland. Swellsharks found off New Caledonia, Vanuatu, and Fiji may also be of this species as they closely resemble Australian specimens, but differ in some morphometric counts. This bottom-dwelling shark occurs at a depth of 480–700 m (1,570–2,300 ft).

== Description ==
The flagtail swellshark reaches a length of at least 74 cm (29 in); if swellsharks from Oceania prove to be conspecific with those from Australia, then this species can grow to over 1 m (3.3 ft) long. It has a fairly stout body and a short, very broad, and strongly flattened head. The snout is rounded, with nostrils preceded by laterally enlarged skin flaps that do not reach the mouth. The slit-like eyes are positioned high on the head, and are followed by tiny spiracles. The mouth is short and wide, without furrows at the corners. There are 84 upper tooth rows and 97 lower tooth rows. Most of the small teeth have three cusps with the central cusp the longest; the teeth toward the jaw corners may also have 1–2 additional lateral cusplets. The upper teeth are exposed when the mouth is closed. The fourth and fifth pairs of gill slits lie over the pectoral fin bases and are shorter than the first three.

The pectoral fins are large and broad, with somewhat pointed tips and nearly straight trailing margins. The first dorsal fin has a narrowly rounded apex and originates over the front half of the bases of the small pelvic fins. The second dorsal fin is smaller and lower than the first, originating before the anal fin origin. The anal fin is much larger and deeper than the second dorsal fin. The caudal fin has a distinct lower lobe and a strong ventral notch near the tip of the upper lobe. The body is densely covered by small, overlapping dermal denticles with a median ridge and a single cusp, though a few may be three-cusped. Adult sharks are variegated brown above, with 9–10 dark saddles over the body and tail, a dark blotch atop each pectoral fin, and a distinctive V-shaped dark marking at the tip of the caudal fin upper lobe; the underside is plain whitish. Juvenile sharks are light yellow above with dark transverse bars, some of which form hollow saddles, and a pair of narrow loops above the spiracles connected by a curved line.

== Biology and ecology ==
Like other members of its genus, the flagtail swellshark can inflate itself with water or air as a defense against predators. Only a few specimens have been collected and almost nothing is known of its natural history.

== Human interactions ==
The conservation status of the flagtail swellshark is considered data deficient by the International Union for Conservation of Nature (IUCN).
