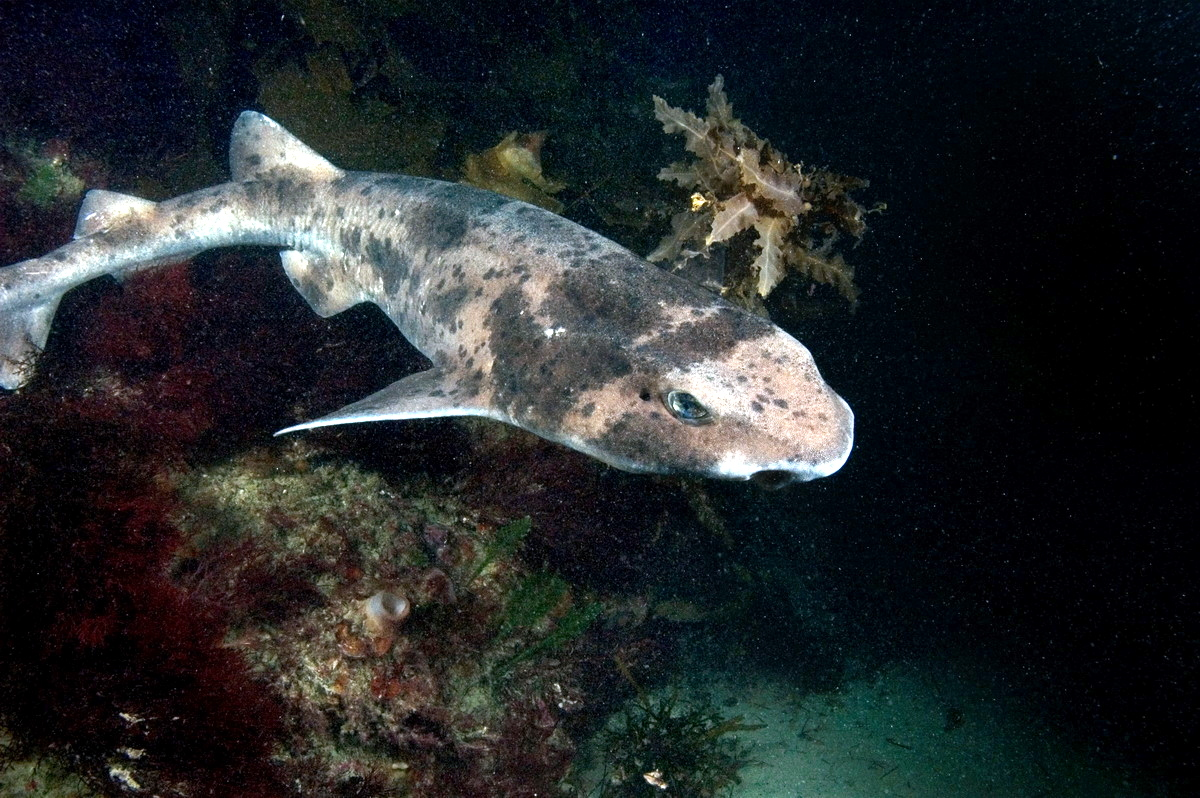

Conservation status
- Least Concern (IUCN 3.1)

Scientific classification
- Kingdom: Animalia
- Phylum: Chordata
- Class: Chondrichthyes
- Subclass: Elasmobranchii
- Division: Selachii
- Order: Carcharhiniformes
- Family: Scyliorhinidae
- Genus: Cephaloscyllium
- Species: C. laticeps

Binomial name
- Cephaloscyllium laticeps (A. H. A. Duméril, 1853)
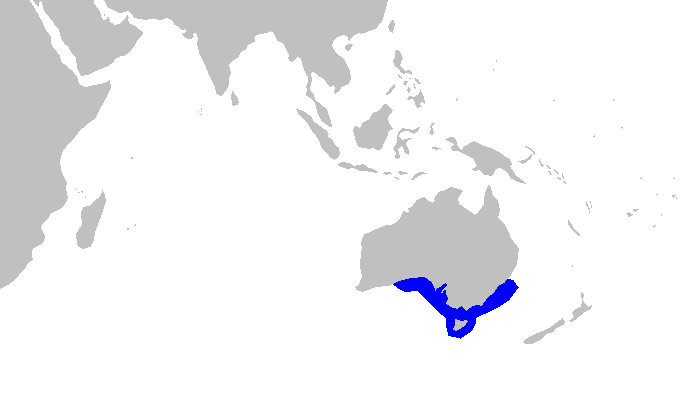
- Range of the Australian swellshark

Synonyms
- Cephaloscyllium nascione Whitley, 1932; Scyllium laticeps A. H. A. Duméril, 1853

= Australian swellshark =

Species of shark

The Australian swellshark (Cephaloscyllium laticeps) or draughtboard shark, is a species of catshark, and part of the family Scyliorhinidae, endemic to southern Australia. This bottom-dwelling species can be found on the continental shelf down to a depth of 220 m (720 ft). Usually measuring 1 m (3 ft 3 in) long, it is a stout-bodied, broad-headed shark with a short tail and a first dorsal fin much larger than the second. It can be identified by its variegated dorsal coloration of brown or grey patches and numerous spots.

Australian swellsharks are sedentary and mainly nocturnal, with most individuals remaining within the same local area throughout the year. It feeds on small crustaceans, cephalopods, and fish. When threatened, it responds by rapidly taking in water or air to inflate its body, hence the name "swellshark". This shark is oviparous and females lay pairs of distinctively ridged egg capsules at 20- to 30-day intervals. The eggs hatch after 11–12 months. Harmless and of little commercial interest, many Australian swellsharks are caught incidentally in gillnets and bottom trawls but usually survive to be released because of their extreme hardiness. As a result, the International Union for Conservation of Nature (IUCN) has assessed this species as of Least Concern.

== Taxonomy ==
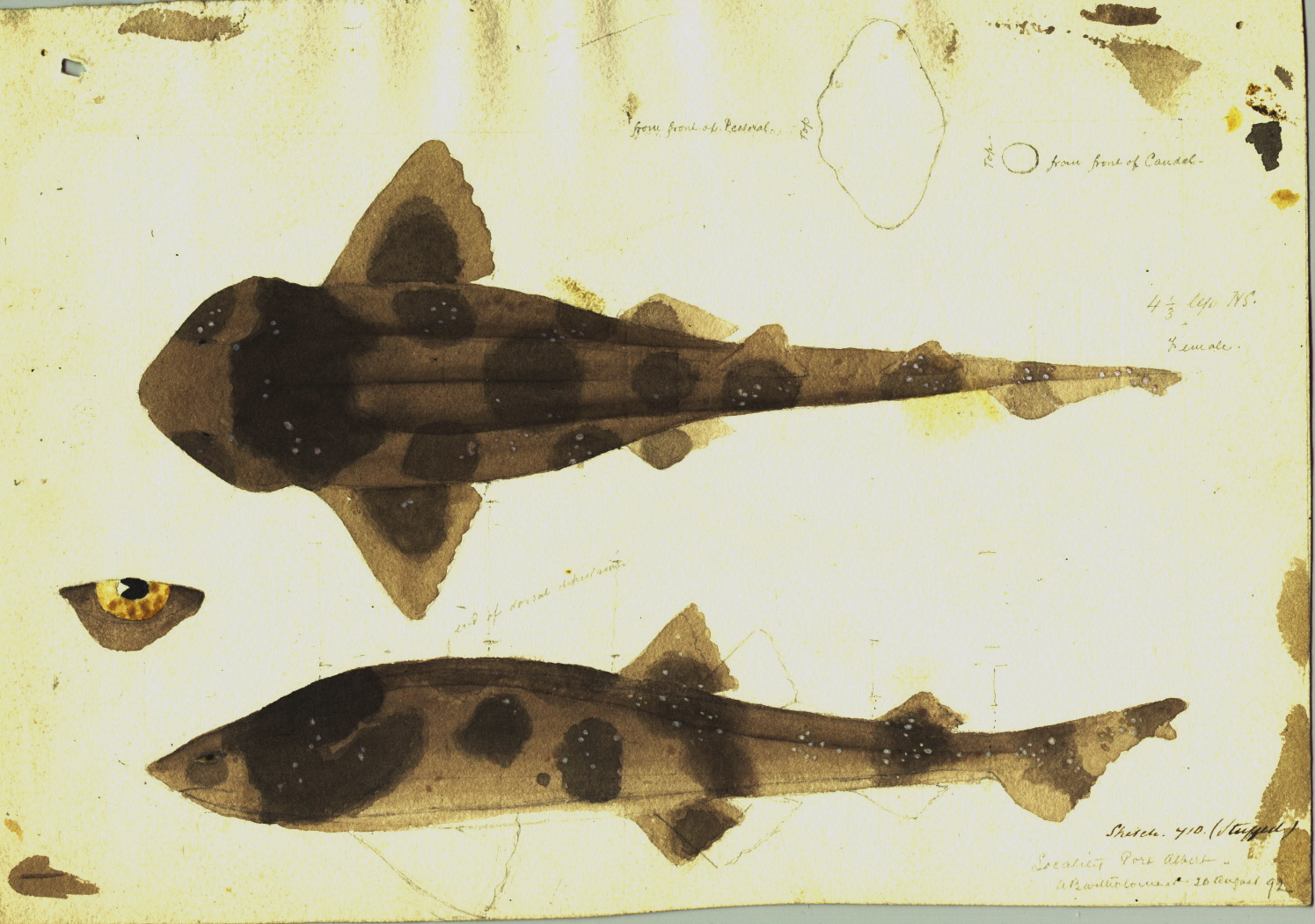
Early illustration of an Australian swellshark

The first scientific description of the Australian swellshark, as Scyllium laticeps, was published in 1853 by French zoologist Auguste Duméril, in the scientific journal Revue et Magasin de Zoologie. The type specimen was a 79-centimetre-long (31 in) male caught off Tasmania. The specific epithet laticeps is derived from the Latin latus, meaning "broad", with the suffix ceps, meaning "head". Other common names for this species include flopguts (a reference to its ability to inflate), Isabell's swell shark, nutcracker shark, rock shark, sleepy Joe, and spotted swellshark. This species is almost identical to the draughtsboard shark (C. isabellum) of New Zealand; the two species differ in coloration and the form of their egg cases (ridged in C. laticeps versus smooth in C. isabellum).

== Description ==
The Australian swellshark has a stocky, rounded body that tapers significantly to the short caudal peduncle. The head comprises no more than a fifth of the total length and is broad and moderately flattened, with a very short, thick, blunt snout. The nostrils are divided into small incurrent and excurrent openings by short, triangular flaps of skin that do not reach the mouth. The mouth is extremely large, without furrows at the corners. The teeth are numerous and small with multiple cusps; the upper teeth are exposed when the mouth is closed. The large, oval eyes are placed somewhat on the upper surface of the head, and have rudimentary nictitating membranes (protective third eyelids) and ridges underneath.

There are two dorsal fins, the first much larger than the second. The first dorsal originates over the forward half of the pelvic fin bases, while the second is located over the anal fin. The pectoral fins are large and broad, and the anal fin is larger than the second dorsal fin. The short and broad caudal fin has an indistinct lower lobe and a prominent ventral notch near the tip of the upper lobe. The skin is thick and covered by well-calcified, arrowhead-shaped dermal denticles, which are more sparse in young sharks. The back and sides are light grey to brown, with an irregular pattern of close-set darker saddles and blotches along with many dark (sometimes light) spots, and a dark stripe from under the eye to the pectoral fin origins. The fins do not have sharply lighter margins. The underside is cream-coloured, with some mottling on the fins and often a dark stripe running down the middle in adults. The maximum known length is 1.5 m (4 ft 11 in), though few exceed 1.0 m (3 ft 3 in).

== Distribution and habitat ==
The Australian swellshark inhabits the continental shelf of southern Australia, from the Recherche Archipelago off Western Australia to Jervis Bay in New South Wales, including Tasmania. It is commonly found on or near the bottom amongst rocky reefs or seaweed beds, from close to shore to a depth of 220 m (720 ft).

== Biology and ecology ==
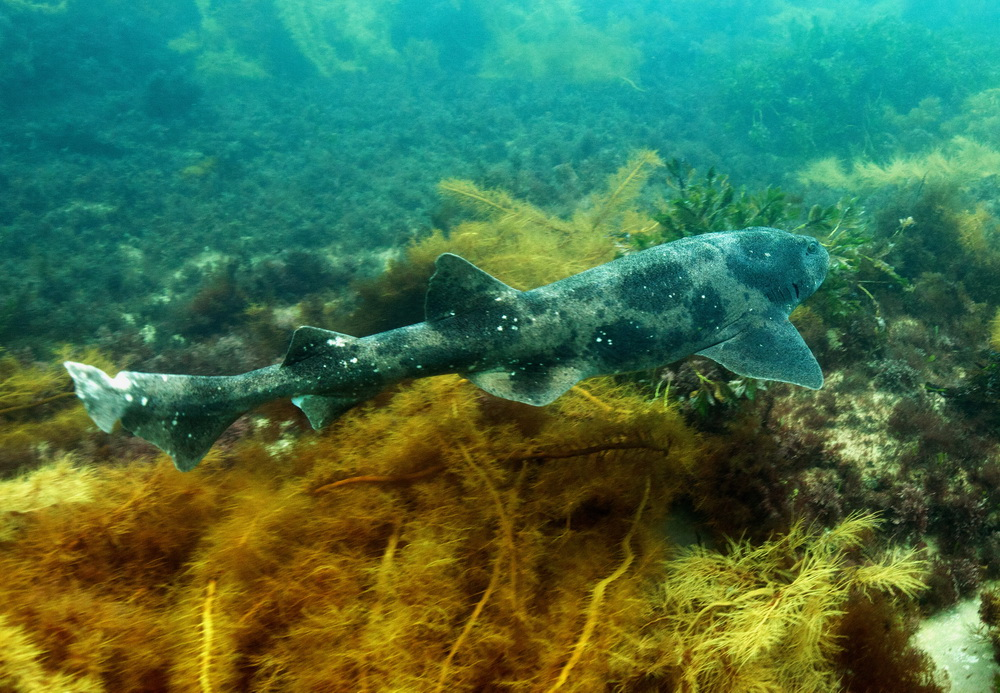
An Australian swellshark off Victoria; this species is abundant within its range.

The most abundant catshark species in the coastal waters of southern Australia, the Australian swellshark is a generally sluggish swimmer that is more active at night. During the day, it is often found resting singly or in groups under ledges or inside caves. Tracking studies have shown that some individuals are continuously active for months at a time, while others alternate activity with periods of stationary rest lasting up to five days. Most Australian swellsharks present within a given region tend to remain there year-round, frequenting established feeding areas or preferred habitats. On the other hand, a minority of sharks have been recorded covering distances of up to 300 km (190 mi). This extremely hardy species can survive for more than a day out of water.

One of the higher-level predators within its ecosystem, the Australian swellshark feeds on crustaceans (particularly crabs and rock lobsters), cephalopods (including squid and octopus), and small fishes. Even large-sized prey tends to be swallowed whole; the long periods of rest exhibited by some sharks may relate to digestion. Like the other members of its genus, this shark is capable of rapidly inflating its body by taking water or air into its stomach, as a defense against predators. These include larger fishes, such as the broadnose sevengill shark (Notorynchus cepedianus), and marine mammals. By inflating, the shark may be able to wedge itself inside crevices, make itself harder to swallow, or simply intimidate a would-be predator. Marine snails are known to prey upon this shark's eggs. The Australian swellshark serves as a host to a number of parasite species, but these are poorly documented.

=== Life history ===
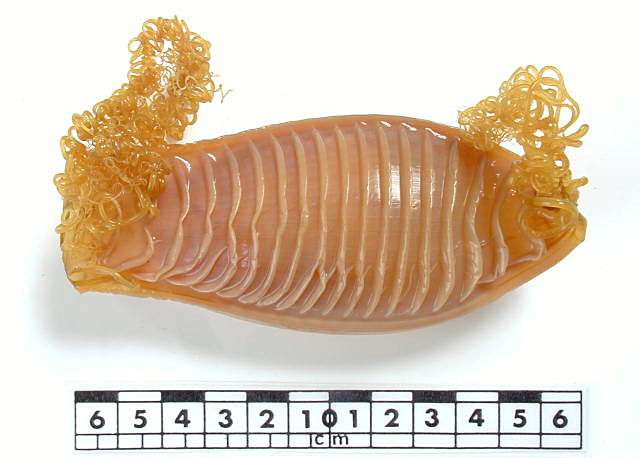
The egg case of the Australian swellshark is distinguished by crosswise ridges.

The Australian swellshark is oviparous. Males have larger teeth than females, with which to bite and hold onto them for copulation. Whether there is a specific mating season is uncertain, though in terms of sperm production males are capable of breeding year-round. Females have a single functional ovary and two oviducts, ovulating a single egg into each at a time. They can store sperm for at least 15 months. Females produce eggs throughout the year, laying them in pairs approximately once every 20 days from January to June, and once every 30 days the rest of the year. The second egg in a pair is deposited 12–24 hours after the first.

The pale, flask-shaped egg capsules measure 13 cm (5 in) long and 5 cm (2 in) across, and bear 19–27 crosswise ridges. There are long, curling tendrils at the four corners, which allow the female to attach the capsule to seaweed or other bottom structures. In captivity, the embryo develops external gills at two months old, which are retained until it is five months old, at which time the internal gills take over and the first pigmentation appears. At six months, embryonic growth accelerates and the yolk sac begins to shrink, disappearing by nine to ten months of age. Hatching usually occurs at eleven to twelve months; the newly emerged young are miniature versions of the adults measuring 14 cm (6 in) long. Males mature sexually at a length of 71–87 centimetres (28–34 in), and females at 75–86 centimetres (30–34 in).

== Human interactions ==
The Australian swellshark is harmless to humans and seldom utilised, though recently in parts of Tasmania some have begun to be marketed as a source of "flake". It is regarded as a nuisance by lobster fishers due to its habit of entering traps to eat the contents. Every year, substantial numbers of Australian swellsharks are caught as bycatch in the southeast Australian shark gillnet fishery, and more in bottom trawls and on longlines. These animals are usually released, and likely suffer minimal mortality due to their resilience. Since this species at present faces little risk from fisheries, the International Union for Conservation of Nature (IUCN) has listed it under Least Concern. Although commercial fisheries reported drops in Australian swellshark catches from 1973 to 1976 and 1998 to 2001, these appeared to have resulted from changing fishing habits rather than actual population declines. Nevertheless, as a precaution the government of Tasmania has instituted a possession limit of two sharks per person or five sharks per boat per day.
