= Reticulated swellshark =

Conservation status
- Critically Endangered (IUCN 3.1)

Scientific classification
- Kingdom: Animalia
- Phylum: Chordata
- Class: Chondrichthyes
- Subclass: Elasmobranchii
- Division: Selachii
- Order: Carcharhiniformes
- Family: Scyliorhinidae
- Genus: Cephaloscyllium
- Species: C. fasciatum

Binomial name
- Cephaloscyllium fasciatum Chan, 1966

Species of shark

The reticulated swellshark (Cephaloscyllium fasciatum) is a catshark of the family Scyliorhinidae. The Reticulated swellshark is found in the western Pacific Ocean between latitudes 21° N and 28° S, at depths between 220 and 450 m. It is a blunt snouted shark with an inflatable stomach, narrow eye slits and a pattern of spots and lines covering its body. It can grow up to 80 cm in length.

== Taxonomy ==
The Reticulated Swellshark belongs to the class of Chondrtichthyes, the subclass of Elasmobranchii, the order of Carcharhiniformes, and the division of Selachii. It is one of many Swell sharks in the Cephaloscyllium genus, the most common being the Cephaloscyllium ventriosum (common swell shark). The class of Chondrichthyes makes it part of the cartilaginous fishes meaning it was no bones and its skeleton is made of cartilage. While the subclass puts it in the category of sharks and rays, and its order places it in the group of ground sharks. Its closest relative being the Cephaloscyllium umbratile (blotchy swellshark or Japanese swellshark). The latin word "fasciata" means banded or reticulated which refers to its pattern. The first part of its scientific name "cephalo" rmeans to the word head while "scyllium" means to the word shark. The entire word together refers to "head-shark" and points out the sharks blunt and flat head. Putting both of the latin words together, Cephaloscyllium fasciatum means “banded head-shark".

== Description ==
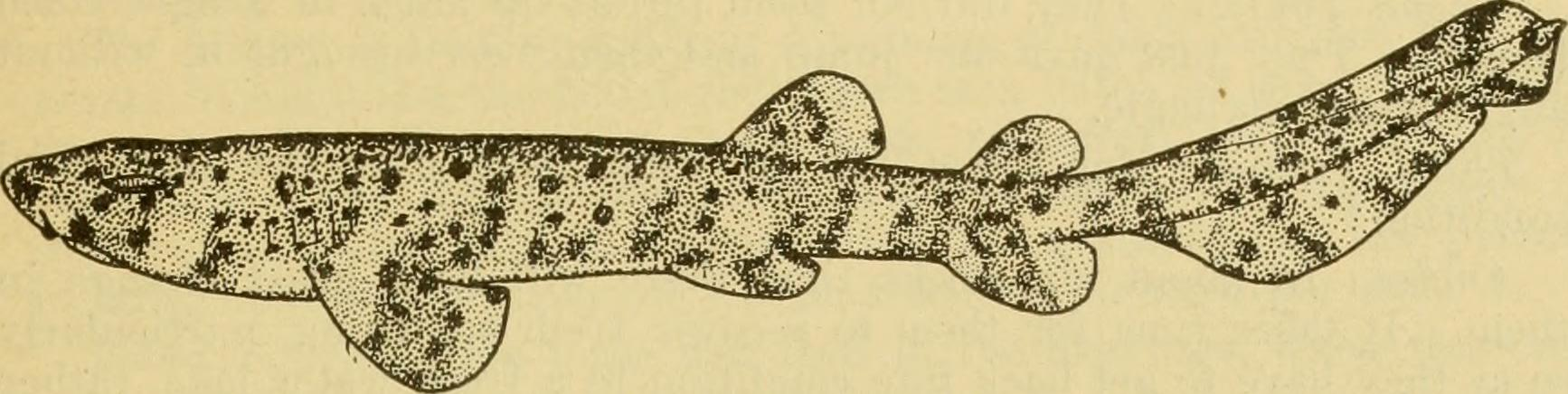

The Reticulated Swellshark is a catshark with a semi-flat body, rounded, blunt snout, and memorable pattern. It has narrow eye slits similar to those of a leopard shark. The shark is a light brown color all around with black and dark brown spots throughout its body. The bottom of its body is a lighter color from the top since it spends a lot of its time in rocky crevices. Its pattern can be described as dark saddle-like loops across its transverse plane. The saddle-like pattern reaches all of its fins as well. What differentiates the shark from other sharks is the lack of labial furrows, its oviparous ability, and the ability to inflate its body. The shark does this by swallowing water to inflate itself which makes it hard for predators to bite it. The catshark has 2 rounded dorsal fins, 2 rounded pectoral fins, 2 pelvic fins, an anal fin, and a long heterocercal caudal fin. It can get up to 1.5 feet in size with its tail taking up almost half of its body. It has an inferior mouth, four to five gills, and spiny, small teeth. The eggs that the swellsharks lay are springy and rubbery. They have a yellowish-brown color to them and are semi-translucent. It has the texture and look of seaweed, it's very easy to think it is a part of sea kelp. It is very easy to see the fetus through the egg casing. The eggs also have tendrils attached to the end of one side. The purpose of the tendrils is to get caught on sea kelp so that they do not float away or get dragged by the current.

== Distribution and maps ==
The shark has been studied and found in the western Pacific Ocean near China and Australia. Its been seen in coastal water and rocky crevices. While other Swellsharks can be tracked along the US and Mexico, the Reticulated Swellshark is more common around Asian waters and the Western Pacific Ocean. Many studies have been conducted in China, the Philippines, Taiwan, and Australia. They tend to stay away from the open ocean, most likely to avoid bigger predators that they cannot hide from. Open ocean predators also tend to have bigger and sharper teeth since the environment around them cannot protect them as well, which explains why even with the swellshark's defense mechanism, it would not be successful in the open ocean. They stick to the coast and to the bottom sea floor. Its flat-like body and inferior mouth indicates that it sticks to the bottom of coastal waters.

== Biology, behavior, and life history ==
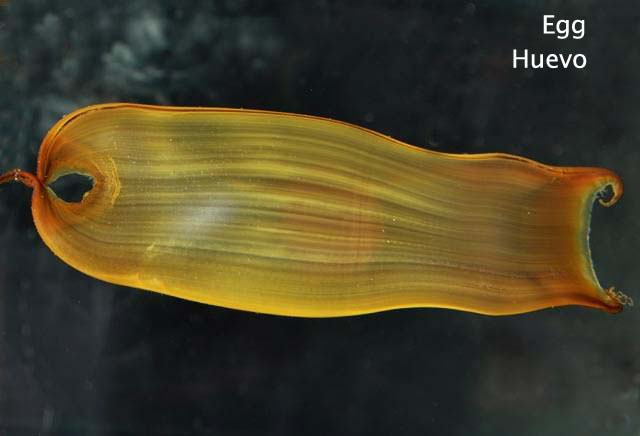

The catshark is known to be oviparous as opposed to other sharks. They lay springy and flexible eggs with tendrils attached to the eggs so they can get caught on sea kelp, giving them some stability. Once the fetus reaches about 5 inches after 9 months in the egg, it then bites and thrashes through the egg, and hatches. The life span of the catshark is an average of 25 years in rocky reefs. The shark does most of its hunting at night camouflaging with the rocky crevices it hides in. Due to its inferior mouth, its diet consists of other fish, usually smaller ones, and different crustaceans. Its first instinct would be to inflate itself to prevent being bitten (as a defense mechanism); the shark is a bit slow and does not tend to get in fights. It is harmless to humans, and no attack from this shark has been recorded. It tends to coast deep waters looking for prey and avoiding predators like the Elephant Seal. Not much is known about how the shark lives its day-to-day life. However, we do know that unlike other sharks, swell sharks tend to stay in the same areas rather than migrating long distances.

== Cultural and economic value ==
There is no known economic value for the Reticulated Swellshark. Fishermen do not tend to attempt to catch this shark, and when they do, it is by accident. They are not hunted for food nor for sport. However, there are guides on how to hunt these sharks which are methods of bottom fishing. While the Reticulated Swellshark may not be specifically hunted, there is a huge market for sharks. Sharks are often tracked and hunted for their fins, and once the fins are cut off, the fishermen leave them to die. It is a very brutal and immoral way of hunting and illegal in some countries. Although shark meat contains many toxins that can harm humans, it is in high demand. The entire industry, including shark and ray meat and shark fins, is worth over $4 billion with over 100 million sharks dying to finning. However, another industry that seems to have a lot of success is the shark tourism industry which makes over $300 million a year from shark diving and shark watching. This number is expected to increase in the next couple of years. There seems to be no cultural value to this shark. However, sharks, as a whole, represent strength, guidance, and protection. So while the reticulated swell shark specifically may not have cultural value, it being a shark has some value. It is usually indigenous communities from different countries that hold value to sharks. For example, the Māori from New Zealand believe the shark symbolizes protection, and "act as guardians of the oceans, ensuring the delicate equilibrium of marine ecosystems". It is not uncommon for other indigenous communities to share the same beliefs of sharks.

== Conservation status ==
While other swell sharks have not been deemed endangered, the reticulated swell shark has been categorized as critically endangered by the IUCN Red list in 2019. As of today, the status of the species has been noticed that its decreasing in population. While it is critically endangered, the reason is currently unknown. However, an educated guess would be that climate change and global warming are playing an effect on this shark. The shark tends to stick to coastal waters which have been getting slightly warmer. Perhaps too warm for the shark and the prey that it eats. Regardless, there are many non-profits and organizations that put in a lot of effort in making sure there are laws put in place to prevent people from finning and fishing sharks.

== Gallery ==
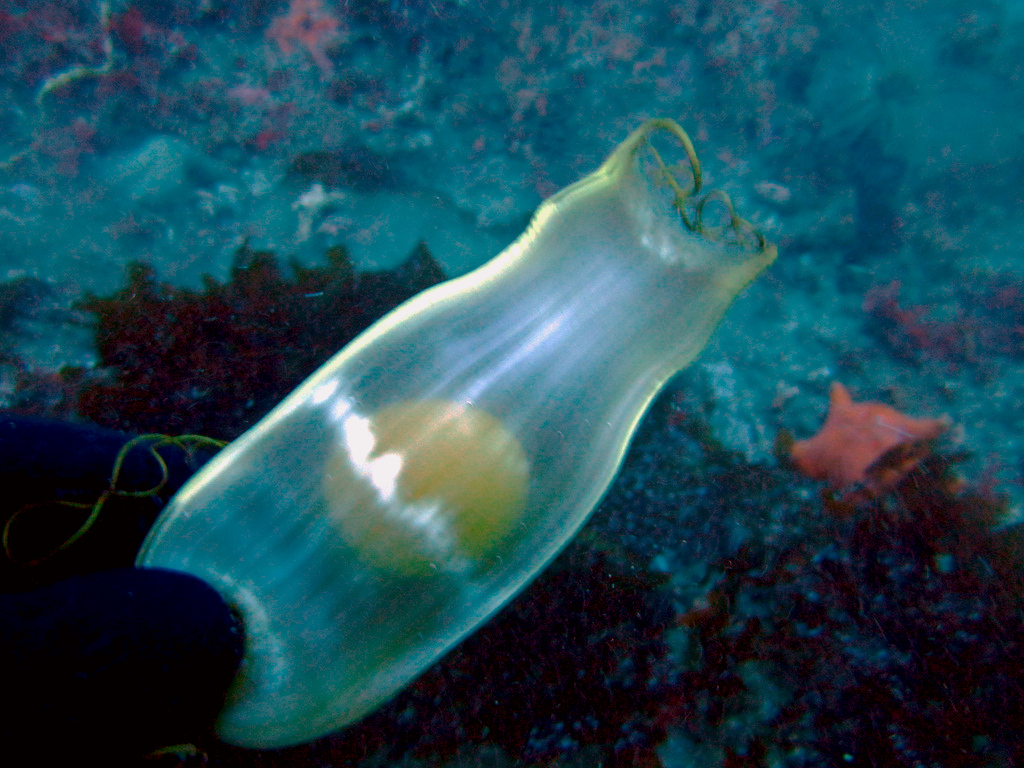
