= Sarawak pygmy swellshark =

Conservation status
- Critically Endangered (IUCN 3.1)

Scientific classification
- Kingdom: Animalia
- Phylum: Chordata
- Class: Chondrichthyes
- Subclass: Elasmobranchii
- Division: Selachii
- Order: Carcharhiniformes
- Family: Scyliorhinidae
- Genus: Cephaloscyllium
- Species: C. sarawakensis

Binomial name
- Cephaloscyllium sarawakensis Ka. Yano, A. Ahmad & Gambang, 2005

Synonyms
- Cephaloscyllium circulopullum Ka. Yano, A. Ahmad & Gambang, 2005

Species of shark

The Sarawak pygmy swellshark (Cephaloscyllium sarawakensis) is a species of catshark, belonging to the family Scyliorhinidae. It is found in the benthic zone near the edge of the Pacific continental shelf, at depths of 118–165 m.

== Description ==
The species reaches a maximum size of 40.8 cm length; males mature at 32.5 cm length and females at 35.4–40.8 cm length. The species uniquely uses sustained single oviparity producing larger but fewer eggs than others.

== Sustained single oviparity ==
The mode of oviparity in the Sarawak pygmy swellshark has been found to differ considerably from the two previously defined modes of oviparity found in Chondrichthyans. This unique form of oviparity has been described as "sustained single oviparity," a mode of oviparity characterized by the deposition and retention of a single egg case in each oviduct until the two embryos reach a length ranging 16.5–20.1% total length.
