= Clasper =

Male anatomical structure found in some groups of animals, used in mating

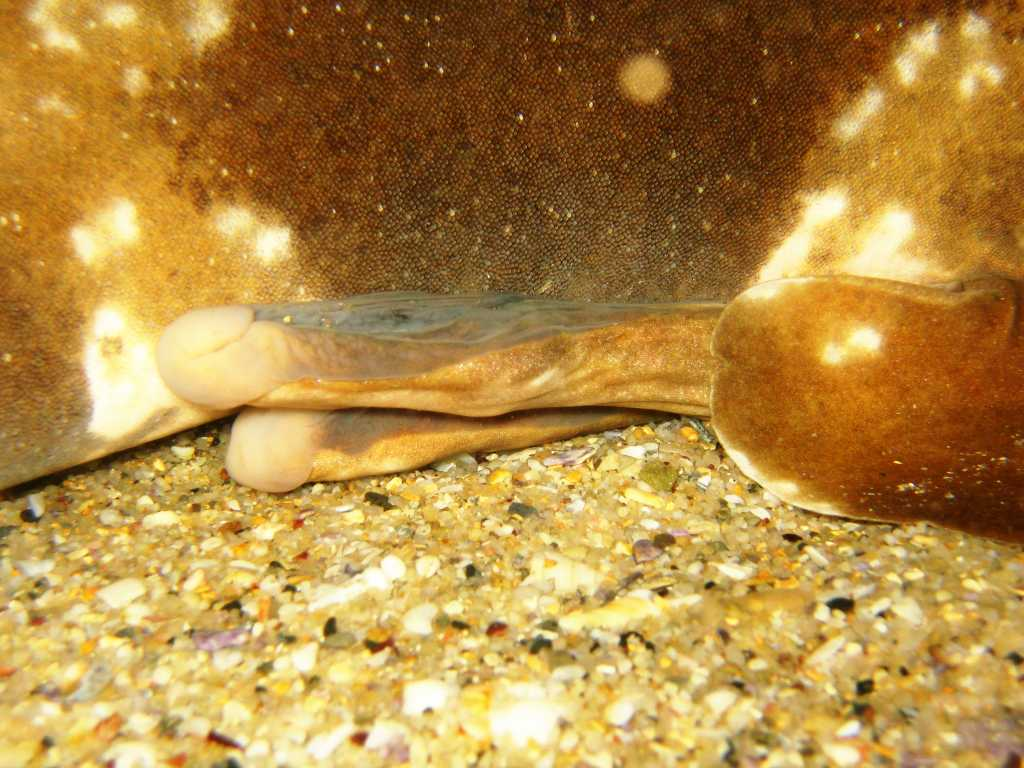
The claspers of a spotted wobbegong shark (Orectolobus maculatus)

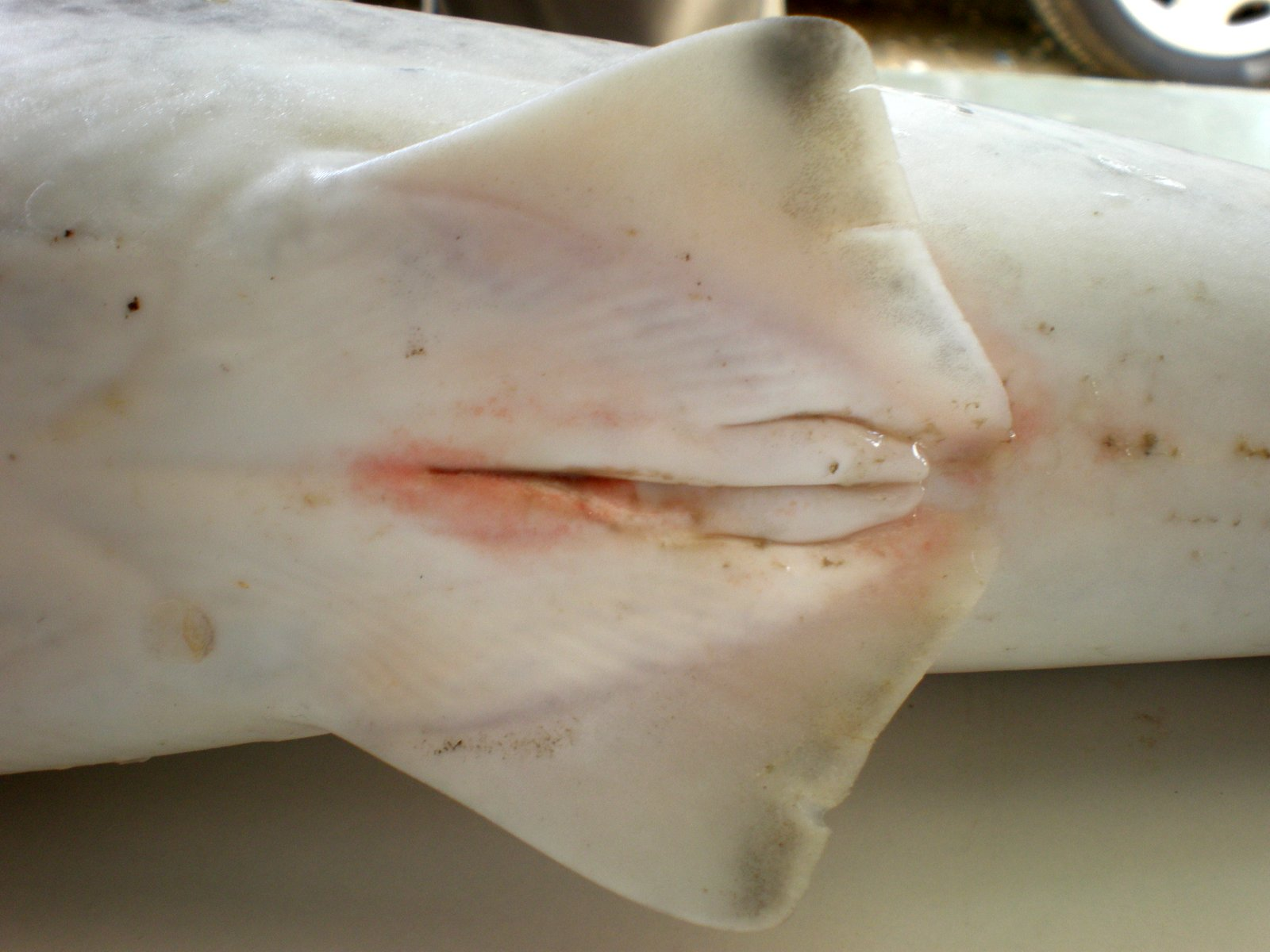
The claspers of a young spinner shark (Carcharhinus brevipinna)

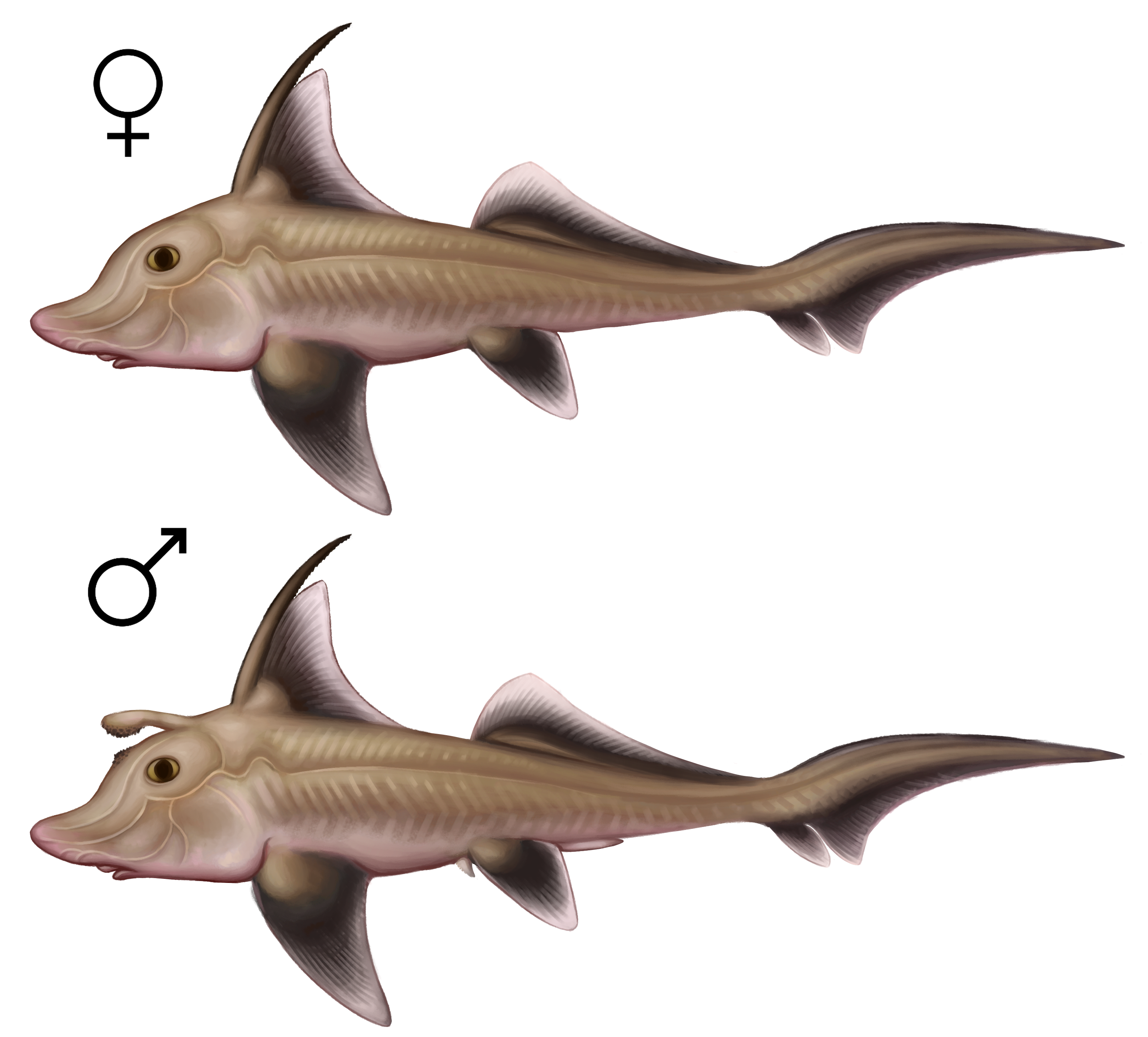
Life restoration of the extinct chimaera Ischyodus, showing the presence of a cephalic clasper on the head of males (as well as a pelvic clasper) but absent in females

In biology, a clasper is a male anatomical structure found in some groups of animals, used in mating.

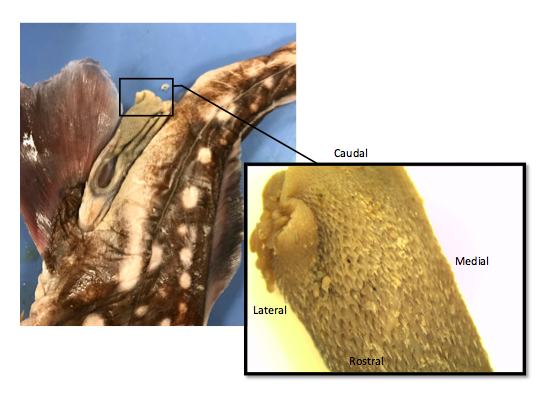
A close up view of a chimaera clasper (Hydrolagus collie). Note the many small tooth-like projections covering the exterior surface.

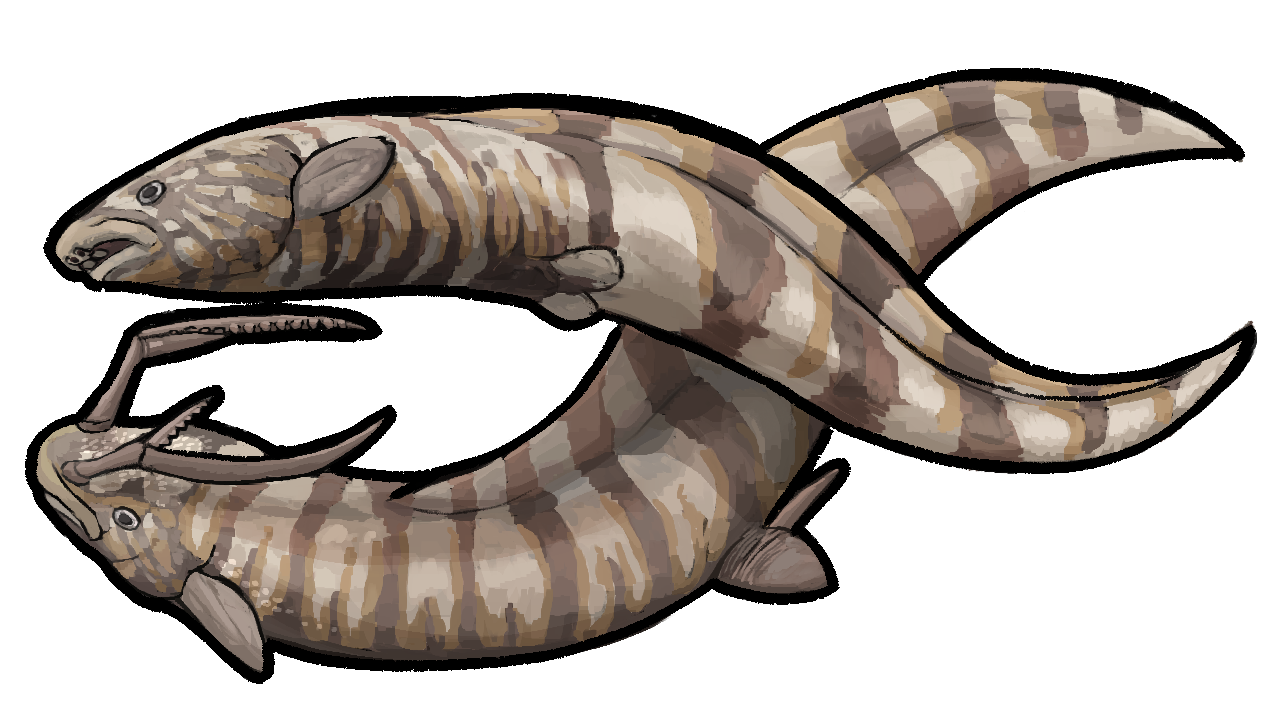
Illustration of Harpagofututor an extinct chimaera-relative in which males (below) had clasper structures on their heads

Male cartilaginous fish have claspers formed from the posterior portion of their pelvic fin which serve to channel semen into the female's cloaca during mating. The act of mating in some fish including sharks usually includes one of the claspers raised to allow water into the siphon through a specific orifice. The clasper is then inserted into the cloaca, where it opens like an umbrella to anchor its position. The siphon then begins to contract, expelling water and sperm. The claspers of many shark species have spines or hooks, which may hold them in place during copulation. Many male holocephalans, including living chimaeras, have cephalic claspers (tenacula) on their heads, which are thought to aid in holding the female during mating.

In entomology, it is a structure in male insects that is used to hold the female during copulation (see Lepidoptera genitalia for more).

== See also ==
- Sexual coercion among animals
