= Spiracle (vertebrates) =

Inspirational organ of most cartilaginous fish

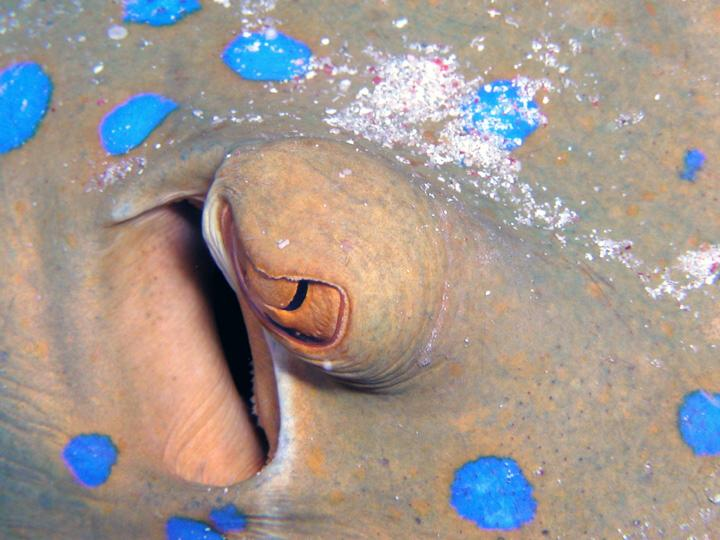
Spiracle of a bluespotted ribbontail ray, Taeniura lymma

Spiracles (/ˈspɪrəkəl, ˈspaɪ-/) are openings on the surface of some animals, which usually lead to respiratory systems.

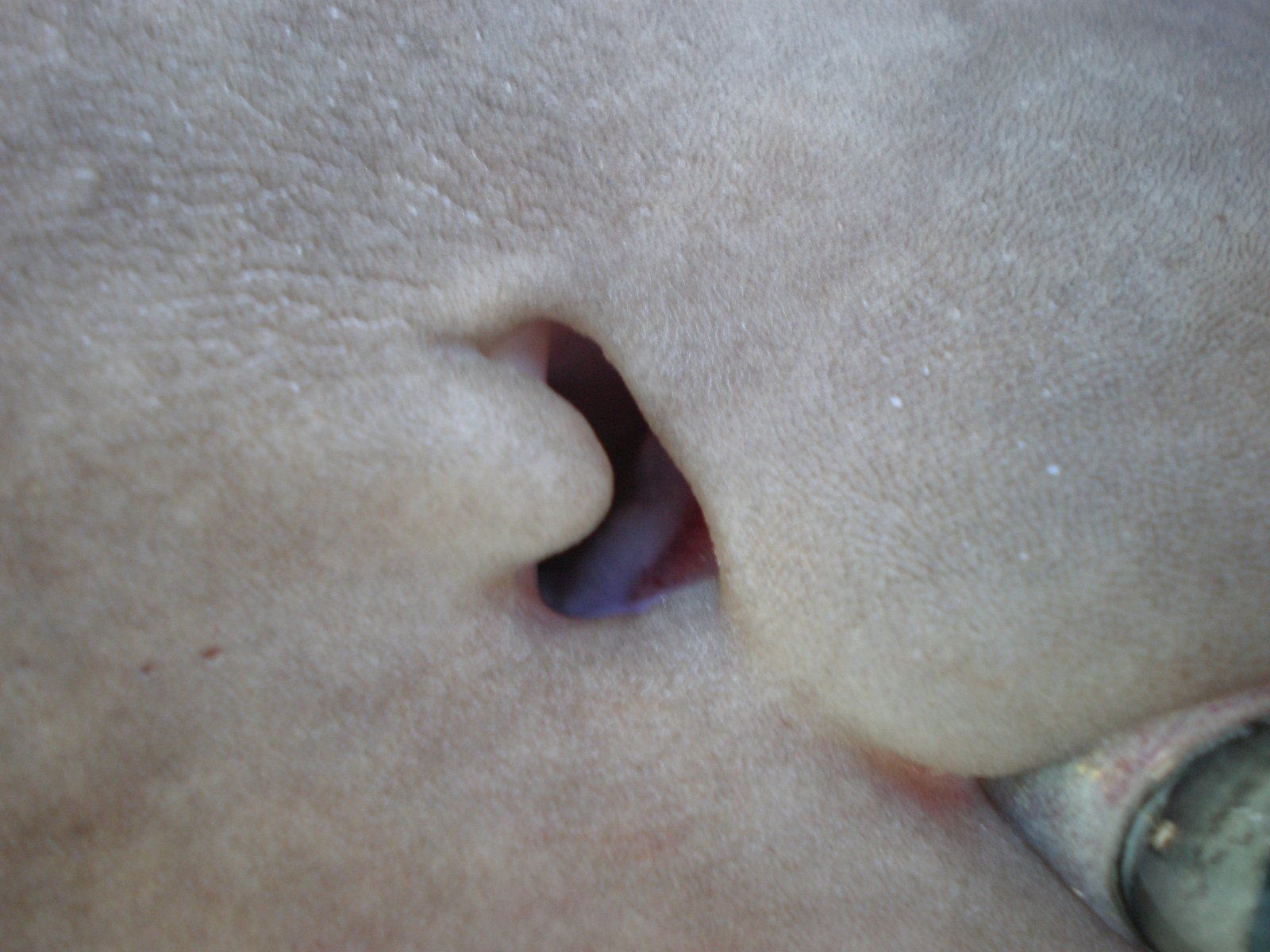
Spiracle of a shark (bighead spurdog, Squalus bucephalus)

The spiracle is a small hole behind each eye that opens to the mouth in some fish. In the jawless fish, the first gill opening immediately behind the mouth is essentially similar to the other gill openings. With the evolution of the jaw in the early jawed vertebrates, this gill slit was caught between the forward gill-rod (now functioning as the jaw) and the next rod, the hyomandibular bone, supporting the jaw hinge and anchoring the jaw to the skull proper. The gill opening was closed off from below, the remaining opening was small and hole-like, and is termed a spiracle.

In many species of sharks and all rays the spiracle is responsible for the intake of water into the buccal space before being expelled from the gills. The spiracle is often located towards the top of the animal allowing breathing even while the animal is mostly buried under sediments. As sharks adapted a faster moving lifestyle some became obligate ram ventilators, breathing exclusively by forcing water through their gills by swimming; among these are requiem sharks and hammerhead sharks, which have lost their spiracles.

In elasmobranchs (sharks and rays) the spiracle bears a small pseudobranch that resembles a gill in structure, but only receives blood already oxygenated by the true gills. The function of the pseudobranch is unknown, but it is believed that it supplies highly oxygenated blood to the optic choroid and retina and may have baroreceptor (pressure) and thermoregulation functions. It may also be a site of oxygen chemoreception.

Chimaeras lack spiracles, using gill opercula for buccal pumping instead. Bony fish have similar gill opercula, but the basalmost ray-finned fish, bichirs, use their spiracles for inhaling air into their lungs; this leads to speculation this may be the original air breathing mechanism ancestral to all bony fish and tetrapods. Coelacanths have closed off spiracles which may be a product of their deepwater lifestyle and loss of air breathing lungs. Bichirs as a whole may more closely resemble the common ancestor of lobe-finned fish and bony fish as a whole than coelacanths due to their deepwater adaptations.

Acipenseriformes including sturgeons and paddlefish have small seemingly vestigial spiracles much like coelacanths further reduced in Holostei and completely absent in Teleostei, the clade containing 96% of all extant species of fish.

In tetrapods the spiracle seems to have developed first into the otic notch of early tetrapods where it was still used in respiration and incapable of sensing sound, and then into the ear of modern tetrapods which by the Eustachian tube remains connected to the buccal cavity.

The spiracle is still found in all cartilaginous fish except requiem sharks, hammerhead sharks, and chimaeras, and is found in some primitive bony fishes (coelacanth, sturgeon, paddlefish and bichirs). It is also seen as an otic notch in the skull of the extinct labyrinthodonts, and is thought to be associated with the ear opening in amniotes and frogs.

Blowholes in cetaceans are also sometimes referred to as spiracles, but they are not homologous with the spiracles of fish, having instead developed from the trachea. In cetaceans and other mammals, the organs homologous with the spiracles of fish are the ears.
