= Marbled catshark =

Marbled catshark may refer to:

- Australian marbled catshark (Atelomycterus macleayi)
- Coral catshark (Atelomycterus marmoratus)
- Roughtail catshark (Galeus arae)
- Speckled carpetshark (Hemiscyllium trispeculare)
