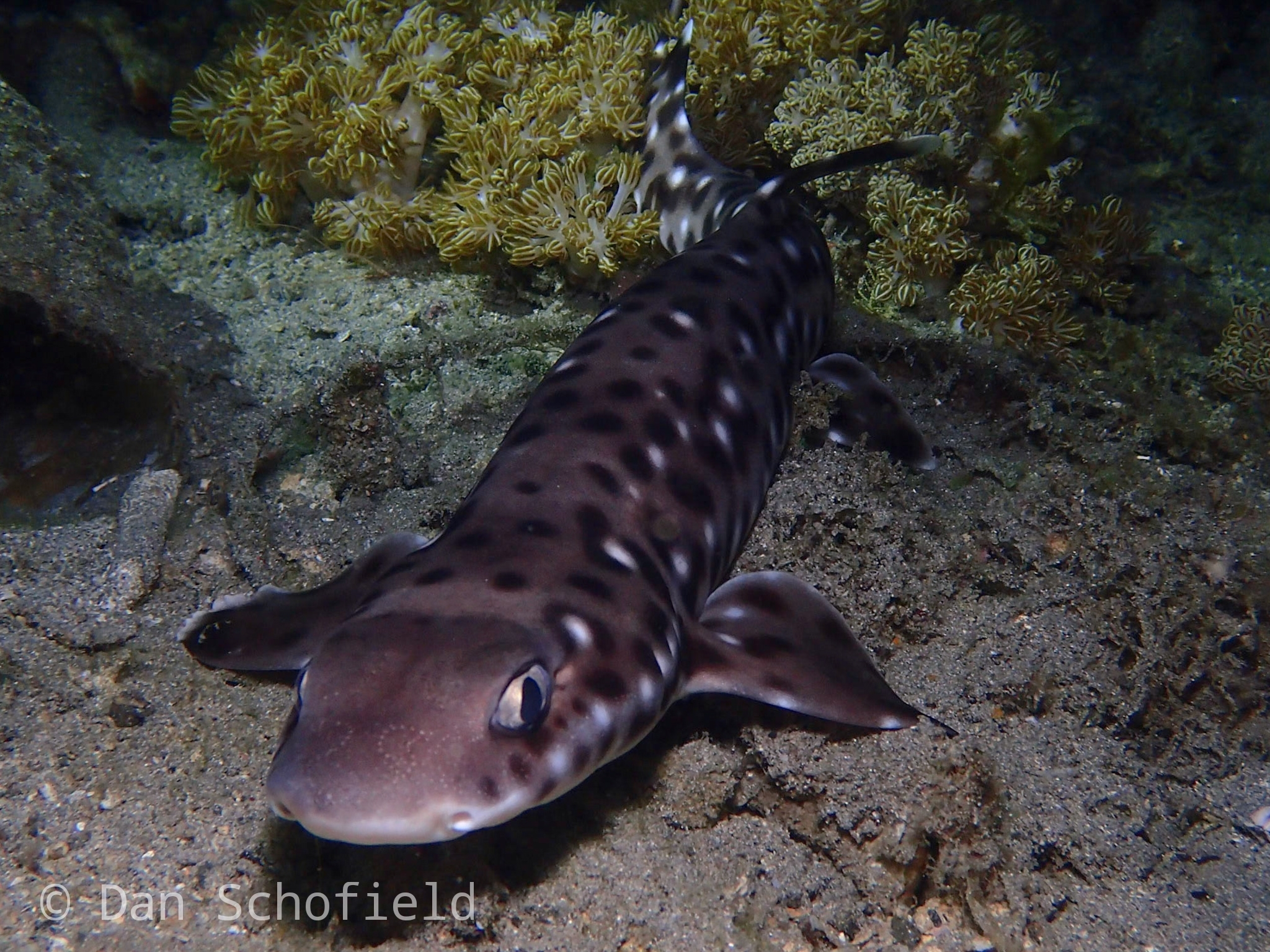

Conservation status
- Least Concern (IUCN 3.1)

Scientific classification
- Kingdom: Animalia
- Phylum: Chordata
- Class: Chondrichthyes
- Subclass: Elasmobranchii
- Division: Selachii
- Order: Carcharhiniformes
- Family: Atelomycteridae
- Genus: Atelomycterus
- Species: A. erdmanni

Binomial name
- Atelomycterus erdmanni Fahmi & W. T. White, 2015

= Spotted-belly catshark =

Species of shark

The spotted-belly catshark (Atelomycterus erdmanni) is a species of coloured catshark belonging to the family Atelomycteridae. It is found in eastern Indonesia. This species differs from Atelomycterus baliensis in having white spots present over the body a larger first dorsal fin, paired fins closer together, and pelvic fin further apart from the ventral caudal-fin origin. A. erdmanni differs from Atelomycterus marmoratus in having far less numerous white spotting a larger first dorsal fin, and the clasper glans about half length of clasper outer margin.
