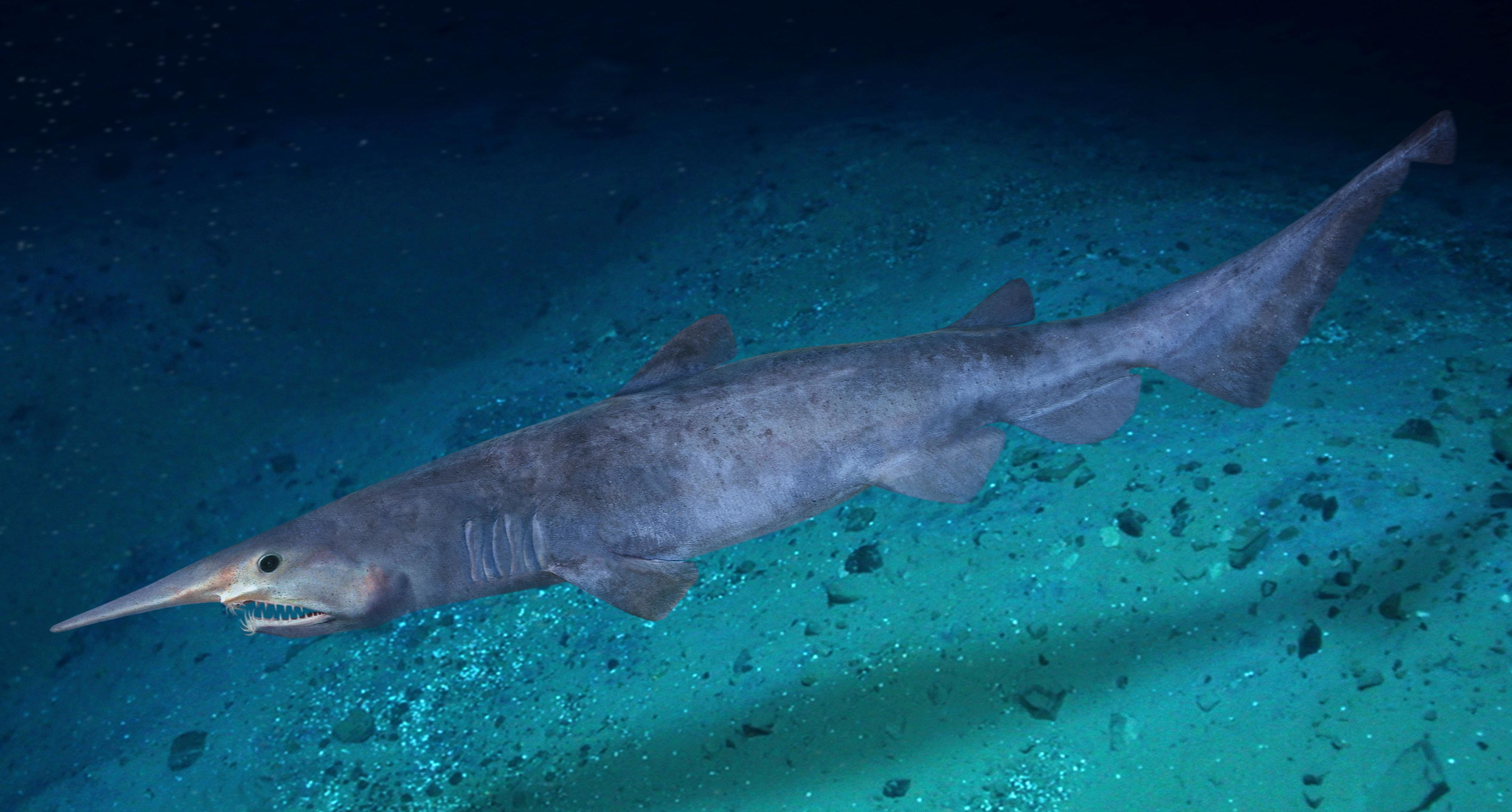

Conservation status
- Least Concern (IUCN 3.1)

Scientific classification
- Kingdom: Animalia
- Phylum: Chordata
- Class: Chondrichthyes
- Subclass: Elasmobranchii
- Division: Selachii
- Order: Lamniformes
- Family: Mitsukurinidae
- Genus: Mitsukurina
- Species: M. owstoni

Binomial name
- Mitsukurina owstoni D. S. Jordan, 1898
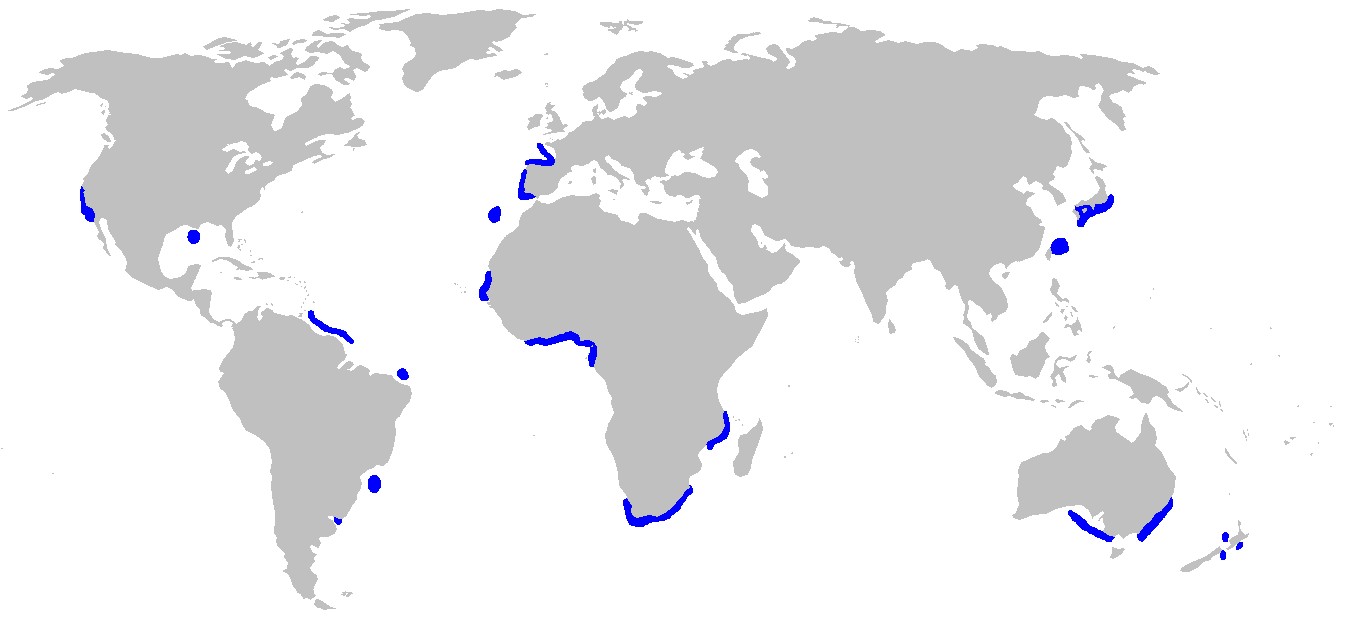
- Range of the goblin shark

Synonyms
- Odontaspis nasutus Bragança, 1904; Scapanorhynchus dofleini Engelhardt, 1912; Scapanorhynchus jordani Hussakof, 1909; Scapanorhynchus mitsukurii White, 1937

= Goblin shark =

Goblin shark Temporal range: Miocene–Holocene

Deep-sea shark

The goblin shark (Mitsukurina owstoni) is a rare species of deep-sea shark. Sometimes called a "living fossil", it is the only extant representative of the family Mitsukurinidae, a lineage some 125 million years old. This pink-skinned animal has a distinctive profile with an elongated, flat snout, and highly protrusible jaws containing prominent nail-like teeth. It typically reaches a length of 3 to 4 meters (10 to 13 feet) when fully grown, although it can grow significantly larger—such as one specimen captured in 2000, which was believed to measure around 6 meters (20 feet). Goblin sharks are benthopelagic creatures that inhabit upper continental slopes, submarine canyons, and seamounts throughout the world at depths greater than 100 m (330 ft), with adults found deeper than juveniles. Some researchers believed that these sharks could also dive to depths of up to 1,300 m (4,270 ft), for short periods; footage captured in 2024 suggests that their range could be deeper than previously thought, with a confirmed sighting of an adult swimming at 2,000 m (6,560 ft).

Various anatomical features of the goblin shark, such as its flabby body and small fins, suggest that it is sluggish in nature. This species hunts for teleosts, cephalopods, and crustaceans near the sea floor and in the middle of the water column. Its long snout is covered with ampullae of Lorenzini that sense minute electric fields produced by nearby prey, which it snatches by rapidly extending its jaws. Small numbers of goblin sharks are unintentionally caught by deepwater fisheries. The International Union for Conservation of Nature (IUCN) has assessed it as Least Concern, despite its rarity, citing its wide distribution and low incidence of capture.

== Taxonomy ==
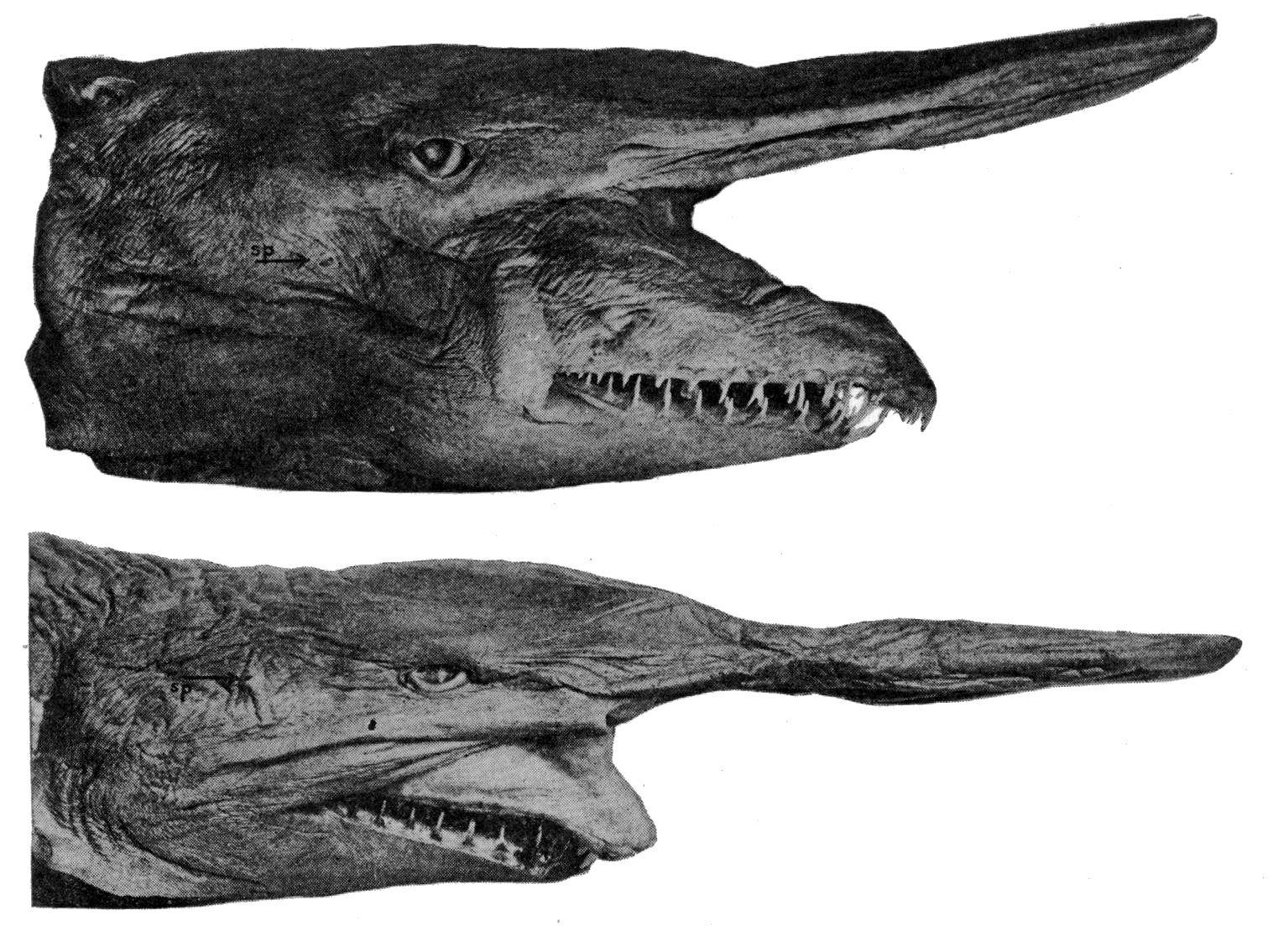
Differing jaw positions in preserved goblin sharks caused several specimens to be described erroneously as distinct species.

American ichthyologist David Starr Jordan described the goblin shark in an 1898 issue of Proceedings of the California Academy of Sciences, recognizing the peculiar fish not only as a new species, but also a new genus and family. He based his account on an immature male 107 cm (42 in) caught in Sagami Bay near Yokohama, Japan. The specimen had been acquired by shipmaster and naturalist Alan Owston, who had given it to Professor Kakichi Mitsukuri at the University of Tokyo, who in turn brought it to Jordan. Jordan named the shark Mitsukurina owstoni in honor of these two men.

The common name "goblin shark" is a calque of its traditional Japanese name 天狗鮫, tenguzame, a tengu being a Japanese mythical creature often depicted with a long nose and red face. Another name for this species is elfin shark.

Soon after Jordan's description was published, several scientists noted the similarity between Mitsukurina and the extinct Mesozoic shark Scapanorhynchus. For a time, the prevailing opinion was to treat Mitsukurina as a junior synonym of Scapanorhynchus. Eventually, more complete fossils revealed many anatomical differences between Scapanorhynchus and Mitsukurina, causing modern authors to again regard them as distinct genera. Several goblin shark specimens were described as separate species from 1904 to 1937, none of which are now considered valid. This taxonomic confusion began because the specimens' jaws were fixed at varying degrees of protrusion during preservation, giving the appearance of proportional differences among the heads.

== Phylogeny and evolution ==
Phylogenetic studies based on morphology have classified the goblin shark as the most basal member of the order Lamniformes, known as mackerel sharks. Studies using genetic data have also confirmed a basal classification for this species. The family Mitsukurinidae, represented by Mitsukurina, Scapanorhynchus, and Anomotodon, dates back to the Aptian age of the Cretaceous period (c. 125–113 Ma). Mitsukurina itself first appears in the fossil record during the period Middle Eocene (c. 49–37 Ma); extinct species include M. lineata and M. maslinensis. Striatolamia macrota, which lived in warm shallow waters during the Paleogene period (c. 66–23 Ma), may also be a Mitsukurina species. As the last member of an ancient lineage, and one that retains several "primitive" traits, the goblin shark has been described as a "living fossil".

== Description ==
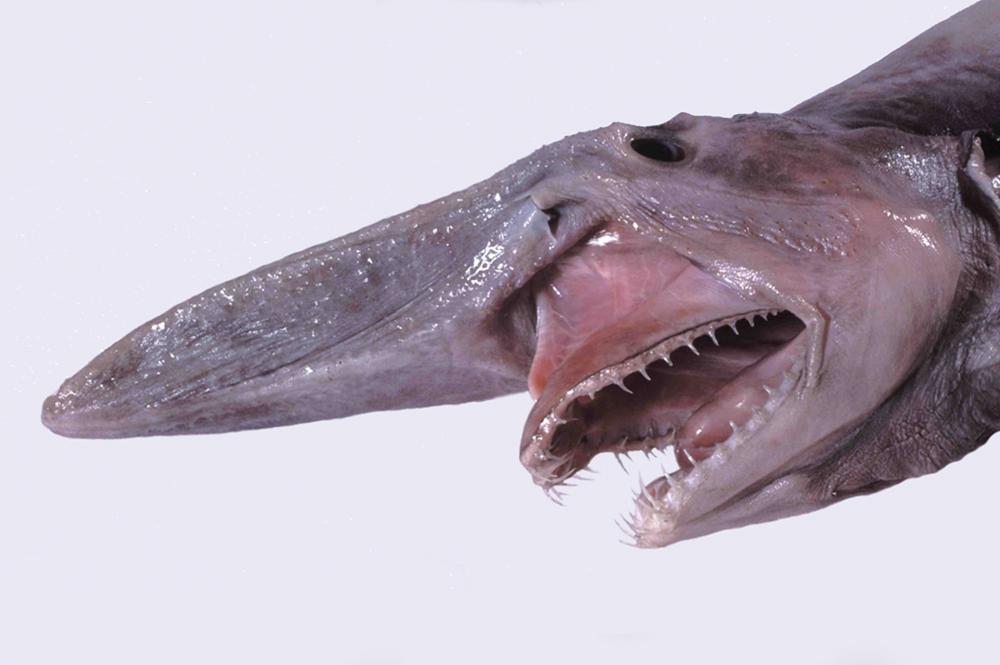
The goblin shark's jaws extend dramatically when feeding.

The goblin shark has a distinctively long and flat snout, resembling a blade. The proportional length of the snout decreases with age. The eyes are small and lack protective nictitating membranes; behind the eyes are spiracles. The large mouth is parabolic in shape. The jaws are very protrusible and can be extended almost to the end of the snout, though normally held flush against the underside of the head. It has 35–53 upper and 31–62 lower tooth rows. The teeth in the main part of the jaws are long and narrow, particularly those near the symphysis (jaw midpoint), and are finely grooved lengthwise. The rear teeth near the corners of the jaw are small and have a flattened shape for crushing. Much individual variation of tooth length and width occurs, as for whether the teeth have a smaller cusplet on each side of the main cusp, and regarding the presence of toothless gaps at the symphysis or between the main and rear teeth. The five pairs of gill slits are short, with the gill filaments inside partly exposed; the fifth pair is above the origin of the pectoral fins.

The body is fairly slender and flabby. The two dorsal fins are similar in size and shape – both being small and rounded. The pectoral fins are also rather small and rounded. The pelvic and anal fins have long bases and are larger than the dorsal fins, while caudal peduncle is flattened from side-to-side and lacks keels or notches. The asymmetric caudal fin has a long upper lobe with a shallow ventral notch near the tip, and an indistinct lower lobe. The soft, semi-translucent skin has a rough texture from a covering of dermal denticles, each shaped like a short upright spine with lengthwise ridges. Living sharks of this species are pink or tan due to visible blood vessels beneath the skin; the color deepens with age, and young sharks may be almost white. The fins' margins are translucent gray or blue, and the eyes are black with bluish streaks in the irises. After death, the coloration fades quickly to dull gray or brown. Adult sharks usually measure between 3 and 4 m (9.8 and 13.1 ft) long. However, the capture of an enormous female estimated at 5.4–6.2 m (18–20 ft) long during 2000 showed this species can grow far larger than suspected previously. A 2019 study suggested that it would have reached 7 m (23 ft) in maximum length. Until 2022, the maximum weight recorded was 210 kg (460 lb) for a shark of 3.8 m (12.5 ft) in length, but the following year, a heavily pregnant, 4.7-metre (15 ft) individual weighing 800 kg (1,800 lb), was landed in Taiwan.

== Distribution and habitat ==
The goblin shark has been caught in all three major oceans, indicating a wide global distribution. In the Atlantic Ocean, it has been recorded from the northern Gulf of Mexico, Suriname, French Guiana, and southern Brazil in the west, and France, Portugal, Madeira, and Senegal in the east. It has also been collected from seamounts along the Mid-Atlantic Ridge. In the Indo-Pacific and Oceania, it has been found off of the coasts of South Africa, Mozambique, Japan, Taiwan, Australia and New Zealand. This species has been recorded from off East Cape to Kaikōura Canyon and from the Challenger Plateau near New Zealand. A single eastern Pacific specimen is known, collected off southern California.

This species is most often found over the upper continental slope at depths of 270–960 m (890–3,150 ft). It has been caught as deep as 1,300 m (4,300 ft), a tooth has been found lodged in an undersea cable at a depth of 1,370 m (4,490 ft). It has been sighted as deep as 2,000 m (6,600 ft). Adults inhabit greater depths than juveniles. Immature goblin sharks frequent the submarine canyons off southern Japan at depths of 100–350 m (330–1,150 ft), with individuals occasionally wandering into inshore waters as shallow as 40 m (130 ft).

== Biology and ecology ==
Although observations of living goblin sharks are scant, its anatomy suggests an inactive and sluggish lifestyle. Its skeleton is reduced and poorly calcified, the muscle blocks along its sides (myomeres) are weakly developed, and its fins are soft and small. Its long caudal fin, held at a low angle, is also typical of a slow-swimming shark. The long snout appears to have a sensory function, as it bears numerous ampullae of Lorenzini that detect weak electric fields produced by other animals. Due to the snout's softness, it is unlikely to be used for stirring up prey from the bottom as has been proposed. Vision seems to be less important than other senses, considering the relatively small optic tectum in the shark's brain. Yet unlike most deep-sea sharks, it can change the size of its pupils, thus probably does use sight in some situations. Goblin sharks may be the prey of blue sharks (Prionace glauca). Parasites documented from this species include the copepod Echthrogaleus mitsukurinae, and the tapeworms Litobothrium amsichensis and Marsupiobothrium gobelinus.

=== Feeding ===
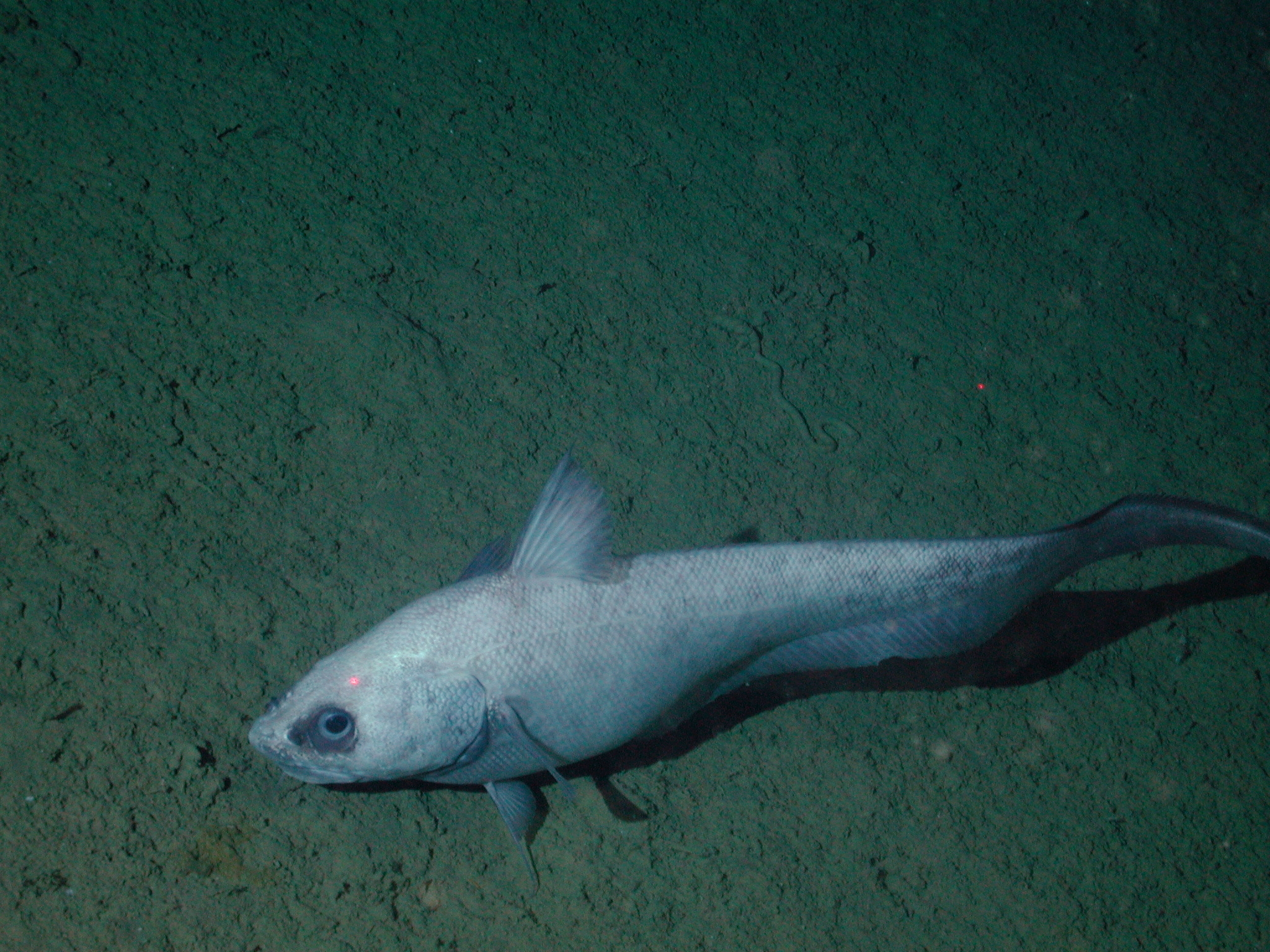
Rattails and other deep-living teleosts are the main food of the goblin shark.

The goblin shark feeds mainly on deep-sea teleost fishes such as rattails and dragonfishes. It also eats cephalopods and crustaceans, including decapods and isopods. Garbage has been recorded from the stomachs of some specimens. Its known prey includes bottom-dwelling species such as the blackbelly rosefish (Helicolenus dactylopterus), and midwater species such as the squid Teuthowenia pellucida and the ostracod Macrocypridina castanea rotunda. Thus, the goblin shark appears to forage for food both near the sea floor and far above it.

Since it is not a fast swimmer, the goblin shark may be an ambush predator. Its low-density flesh and large oily liver make it neutrally buoyant, allowing it to drift towards its prey with minimal motions so as to avoid detection. Once prey comes into range, the shark's specialized jaws can snap forward to capture it. The protrusion of the jaw is assisted by two pairs of elastic ligaments associated with the mandibular joint, which are pulled taut when the jaws are in their normal retracted position. Upon biting, the ligaments release their tension and "catapult" the jaws forward. At the same time, the well-developed basihyal (analogous to a tongue) on the floor of the mouth drops, expanding the oral cavity and sucking in water and prey. Striking and prey capture events were recorded for the first time in 2008 and 2011 and helped to confirm the use and systematics of the protrusible jaws. Goblin sharks use ram feeding, a type of prey capture typical of many mackerel sharks. The video evidence suggests that what makes the goblin shark unique is the kinematics of their jaw when feeding. The lower jaw seems to undergo more complex movements and is important in capturing the prey. The measured protrusions of the upper and lower jaw combined put the goblin shark jaws at 2.1–9.5 times more protrusible than other sharks. The lower jaw has a velocity about two times greater than the upper jaw because it not only protrudes forward, but also swings upward to capture the prey, and the maximum velocity of the jaws is 3.14 m/s (10.3 ft/s). The goblin shark has a re-opening and re-closing pattern during the strike, a behavior never observed in other sharks, and which could be related to the extent with which the goblin shark protrudes its jaws.

=== Growth and reproduction ===
The reproductive behaviors of the goblin shark are poorly understood and mating has never been observed. Fishermen in Taiwan captured a pregnant female carrying six pups in 2023. It likely shares the reproductive characteristics of other mackerel sharks, which are viviparous with small litter sizes and embryos that grow during gestation by eating undeveloped eggs (oophagy). The birth size is probably close to 82 cm (32 in), the length of the smallest known specimen. Males mature sexually at about 2.6 m (8.5 ft) long, while female maturation size is unknown. No data is available concerning growth and aging. Some researchers have estimated, based on their own research and prior findings, that male goblin sharks mature at approximately 16 years old and can live up to 60 years.

== Human interactions ==
As a deep-sea species, the goblin shark has not been shown to pose a danger to humans. After David Starr Jordan described the shark in 1898, more findings were published in 1910. "The new shark is certainly grotesque, [...] the most remarkable feature is the curiously elongated nose." A few specimens have been collected alive and brought to public aquariums, though they only survived briefly. One kept at Tokai University lived for a week, while another at Tokyo Sea Life Park lived for two days. Its economic significance is minimal; the meat may be dried and salted, while the jaws fetch high prices from collectors. At one time, the Japanese used it for liver oil and fertilizer. This shark is not targeted by any fisheries, but is occasionally found as bycatch in bottom gillnets and trawls, hooked on longlines, or entangled in fishing gear. Most captures are isolated incidents; one of the few areas where it is caught regularly is off southern Japan, where around 30 individuals (mostly juveniles) are taken each year. A black scabbardfish (Aphanopus carbo) fishery off Madeira also takes two or three goblin sharks annually. During April 2003, more than a hundred goblin sharks were caught off northwestern Taiwan; the cause of the event was unknown, though observers noted it was preceded by a major earthquake. The species had never been recorded in the area before, nor found in such numbers since.

The International Union for Conservation of Nature (IUCN) categorized the goblin shark as Least Concern. In addition to its wide range, most of its population is thought to reside in unfished environments because few adults are caught. Therefore, it is not believed to be threatened by human activity. However, during June 2018 the New Zealand Department of Conservation classified the goblin shark as "At Risk – Naturally Uncommon" with the qualifiers "Data Poor" and "Secure Overseas" using the New Zealand Threat Classification System.
