= Lizard catshark =

Conservation status
- Vulnerable (IUCN 3.1)

Scientific classification
- Kingdom: Animalia
- Phylum: Chordata
- Class: Chondrichthyes
- Subclass: Elasmobranchii
- Division: Selachii
- Order: Carcharhiniformes
- Family: Atelomycteridae
- Genus: Schroederichthys
- Species: S. saurisqualus

Binomial name
- Schroederichthys saurisqualus Soto, 2001

Species of shark

The lizard catshark (Schroederichthys saurisqualus) is a small shark species of the catshark family, Scyliorhinidae, found off the coast of southern Brazil on the upper continental shelf at depths of between 250 and 500 metres (820 and 1,640 ft).

== Description ==
The lizard catshark is a small species growing to a maximum size of 59 centimetres (23 in) for males and 69 centimetres (27 in) for females. It is similar in appearance to the slender catshark (Schroederichthys tenuis) but can be distinguished from it by the fact that it has white spotting, a longer distance between the two dorsal fins and a longer distance between the pelvic and anal fins. The dermal denticals on its skin are rounded rather than pointed and it has about 122 vertebrae while the slender catshark has only about 110.

== Distribution and habitat ==
The lizard catshark is native to the Atlantic coast of South America where it is present off Brazil. It is found on the upper part of the continental slope at depths of between 250 and 500 metres (820 and 1,640 ft) among deepwater reefs where there are corals, tube sponges, gorgonians, crinoids and brittle stars. There are often many freckled catsharks (Scyliorhinus haeckelii) in the same habitat.

== Biology ==
The lizard catshark lays a pair of eggs which are encased in greyish-green capsules with filamentous exteriors. The developing embryos feed on the egg yolks and hatch as miniature fish.

== Status ==
The lizard catshark has been assessed by the International Union for Conservation of Nature as being a "vulnerable species". This is because it has a small total population and a limited range, only 600 kilometres (370 mi) of coastline, and lays its eggs in patches of coral which are susceptible to damage through trawling. The water temperature is low (5 to 8 °C (41 to 46 °F)) in these parts and the coral is slow to regrow. The IUCN advocates the cessation of trawling on the lower continental shelf and upper slope of the reefs to prevent further decline in this species.
