= Litobothrium amsichensis =

Scientific classification
- Kingdom: Animalia
- Phylum: Platyhelminthes
- Class: Cestoda
- Order: Litobothriidea
- Family: Litobothriidae
- Genus: Litobothrium
- Species: L. amsichensis

Binomial name
- Litobothrium amsichensis Caira & Runkle, 1993

Species of flatworm

Litobothrium amsichensis is a species of tapeworms from the family Litobothriidae.

This species was first described (along with Marsupiobothrium gobelinus) from a specimen collected from the spiral valve digestive organ of a goblin shark (Mitsukurina owstoni) caught in New South Wales in Australia.
