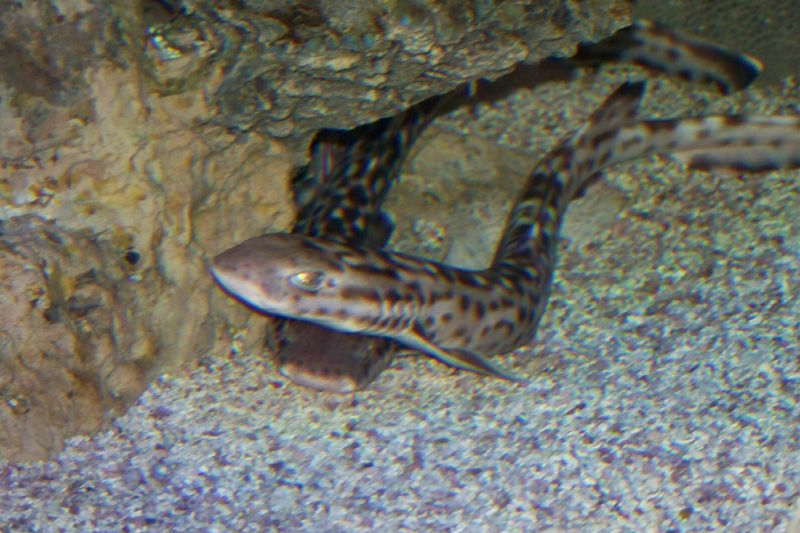
- Coral catshark (Atelomycterus marmoratus)

Scientific classification
- Kingdom: Animalia
- Phylum: Chordata
- Class: Chondrichthyes
- Subclass: Elasmobranchii
- Division: Selachii
- Order: Carcharhiniformes
- Suborder: Carcharhinoidei
- Family: Atelomycteridae; E. G. White, 1936

Genera
- See text

= Atelomycteridae =

Family of cartilaginous fish

Atelomycteridae, the coloured catsharks, is a family of sharks belonging to the order Carcharhiniformes. These sharks are found in the Indian, Pacific and Western Atlantic Oceans.

== Genera ==
Atelomycteridae contains the following genera and species:

  - Genus Atelomycterus Garman, 1913
    - Atelomycterus baliensis W. T. White, Last & Dharmadi, 2005 (Bali catshark)
    - Atelomycterus erdmanni Fahmi & W. T. White, 2015 (spotted-belly catshark)
    - Atelomycterus fasciatus Compagno & Stevens, 1993 (banded sand catshark)
    - Atelomycterus macleayi Whitley, 1939 (Australian marbled catshark)
    - Atelomycterus marmoratus Anonymous, referred to E. T. Bennett, 1830 (coral catshark)
    - Atelomycterus marnkalha Jacobsen & M. B. Bennett, 2007 (eastern banded catshark)
  - Genus Aulohalaelurus Fowler, 1934
    - Aulohalaelurus kanakorum Séret, 1990 (Kanakorum catshark)
    - Aulohalaelurus labiosus Waite, 1905 (Australian blackspotted catshark)
  - Genus Schroederichthys A. Smith, 1838
    - Schroederichthys bivius (J. P. Müller & Henle, 1838) (narrowmouthed catshark)
    - Schroederichthys chilensis (Guichenot, 1848) (redspotted catshark)
    - Schroederichthys maculatus S. Springer, 1966 (narrowtail catshark)
    - Schroederichthys saurisqualus Soto, 2001 (lizard catshark)
    - Schroederichthys tenuis S. Springer, 1966 (slender catshark)
