= New Caledonia catshark =

Conservation status
- Data Deficient (IUCN 3.1)

Scientific classification
- Kingdom: Animalia
- Phylum: Chordata
- Class: Chondrichthyes
- Subclass: Elasmobranchii
- Division: Selachii
- Order: Carcharhiniformes
- Family: Atelomycteridae
- Genus: Aulohalaelurus
- Species: A. kanakorum

Binomial name
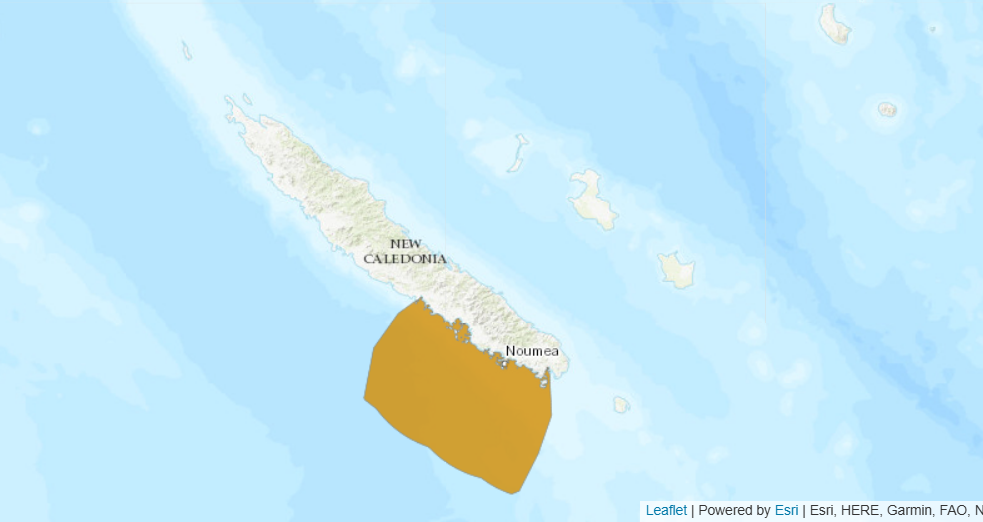
- Aulohalaelurus kanakorum Séret, 1990 Aulohalaelurus kanakorum range map

Species of shark

New Caledonia catshark (Aulohalaelurus kanakorum) is a species of catshark in the family Scyliorhinidae. It is a small shark known only from New Caledonia in the western central Pacific Ocean and has been assessed as Data Deficient on the IUCN Red List of Threatened Species.

== Taxonomy ==
Aulohalaelurus kanakorum was described by Bernard Séret in 1990. It belongs to the kingdom Animalia, phylum Chordata, class Chondrichthyes, order Carcharhiniformes, family Scyliorhinidae and genus Aulohalaelurus. Its English common name is New Caledonia catshark.

== Distribution and habitat ==
The New Caledonia catshark is native to New Caledonia. It is known only from the type locality at the pass of the islet N'Do, off Noumea in the southwestern lagoon of New Caledonia, where it was recorded on an external coral reef at a depth of 49 m. Additional records consist of underwater photographs of two specimens.

The species occurs in marine neritic waters and is associated with coral reef habitat in the western central Pacific (FAO Pacific – western central fishing area). It has been recorded at 49 m depth, which is both the upper and lower depth limit currently documented.

== Description ==
The New Caledonia catshark is a small shark reaching a maximum recorded size of 78.5 cm total length. Nothing else is known of its biology.

== Population ==
Aulohalaelurus kanakorum is known from a single specimen and two photographs, and its population size and structure are unknown. The area around the type locality has been well surveyed, and the species is therefore considered likely to be rare and localised. The current population trend is unknown.

== Threats ==
The only known specimen was taken by handline in 1986, and the species may be taken by subsistence fisheries.

The New Caledonia catshark may be susceptible to coral reef habitat deterioration and loss caused by sediment runoff and pollution from mining operations, coastal development and mangrove destruction, as well as the future effects of climate change, including coral bleaching. Long-term coral reef monitoring in New Caledonia indicates little evidence of decline in reef health and a strong ability to recover from disturbances, but the specific impact of these pressures on the New Caledonia catshark remains unknown.

== Conservation ==
In 2018, the New Caledonia catshark was assessed as Data Deficient under IUCN Red List criteria (version 3.1) because it is only known from one specimen and two photographs and there is insufficient information on its distribution, population status, ecology and threats to assess its risk of extinction beyond this category. A previous global assessment in 2003 listed the species as Vulnerable.

There are no species-specific conservation measures currently in place for Aulohalaelurus kanakorum. Further information is required on its full distribution, life history and threats, and monitoring of population trends has been identified as a research need. The lagoons of New Caledonia were declared World Heritage Sites in 2008, and existing Marine Protected Areas in the region may provide some habitat refuge for the species.
