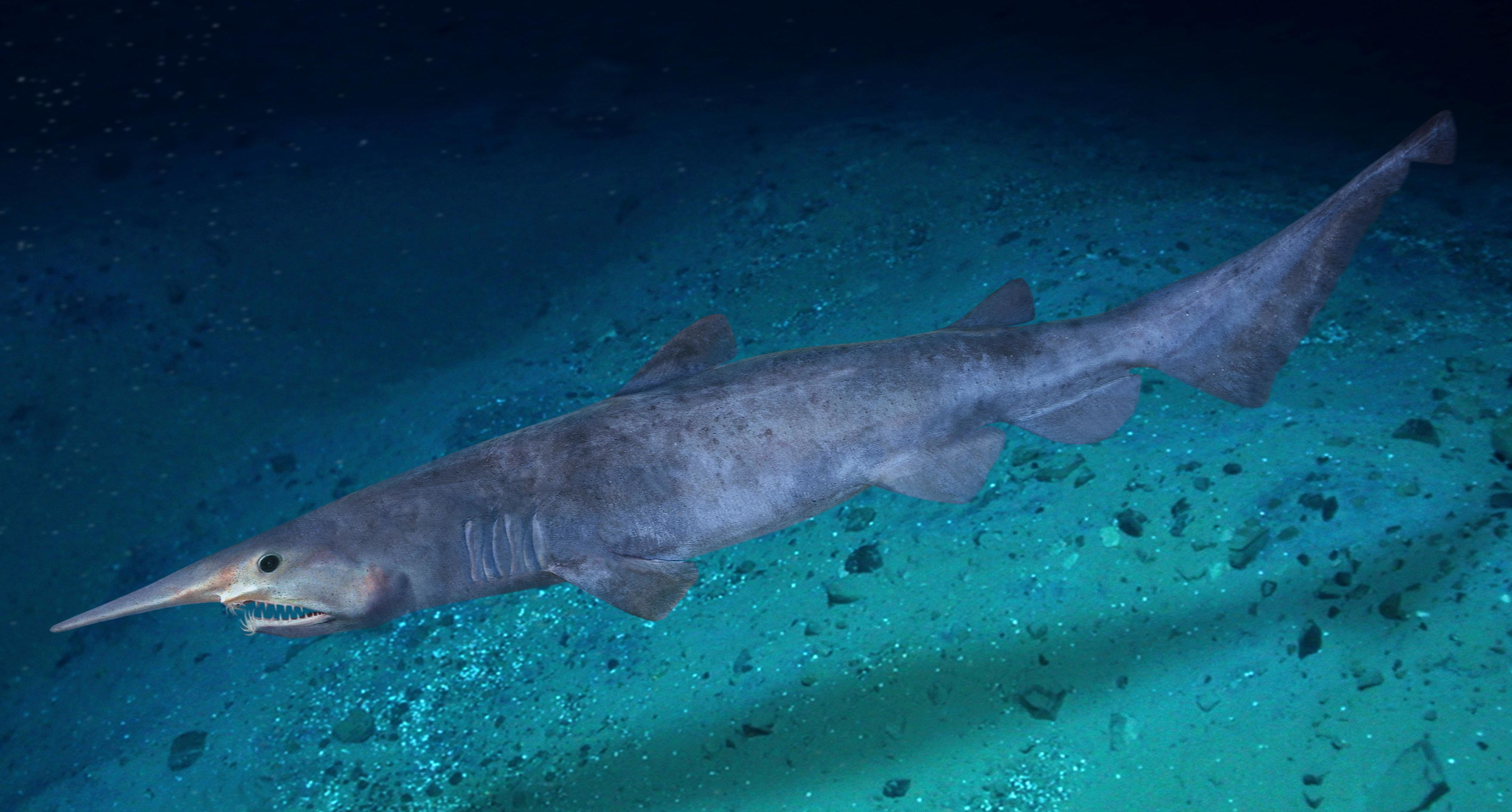
- Goblin shark (M. owstoni)

Scientific classification
- Kingdom: Animalia
- Phylum: Chordata
- Class: Chondrichthyes
- Subclass: Elasmobranchii
- Division: Selachii
- Order: Lamniformes
- Family: Mitsukurinidae
- Genus: Mitsukurina; D. S. Jordan, 1898

Type species
- Mitsukurina owstoni D. S. Jordan, 1898

Species
- †Mitsukurina lineata (Probst, 1879); †Mitsukurina maslinensis (Pledge, 1967); Mitsukurina owstoni Jordan, 1898 (goblin shark)

= Mitsukurina =

Mitsukurina Temporal range: Eocene - Holocene, 40–0 Ma

Genus of sharks

Mitsukurina is a genus of mackerel shark in the family Mitsukurinidae. It contains one extant species, the goblin shark (M. owstoni) and more extinct species. The genus was described by American ichthyologist David Starr Jordan in 1898 and named in honour of Kakichi Mitsukuri.

== Species ==
- †Mitsukurina lineata (Probst, 1879)
- †Mitsukurina maslinensis (Pledge, 1967)
- Mitsukurina owstoni Jordan, 1898 (goblin shark)
