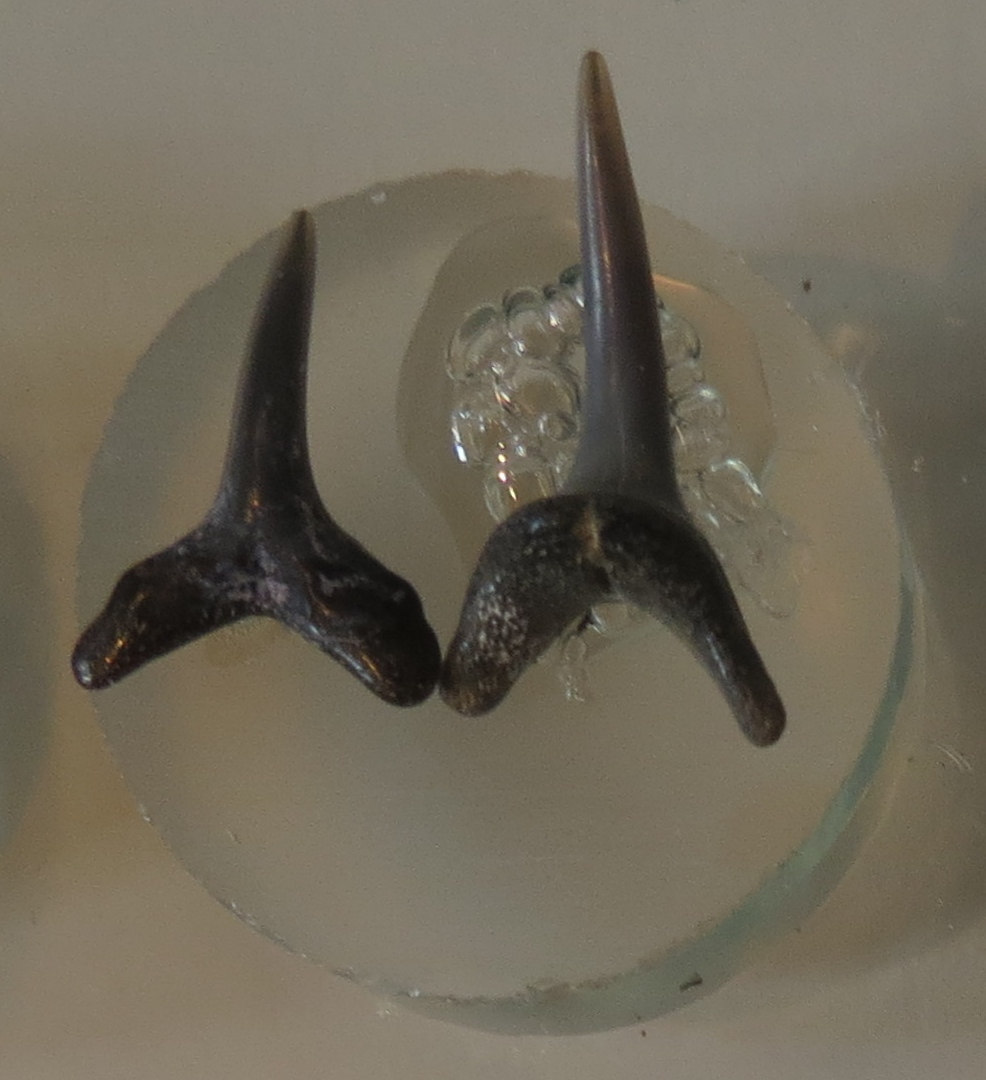
- Fossil tooth of A. novus

Scientific classification
- Kingdom: Animalia
- Phylum: Chordata
- Class: Chondrichthyes
- Subclass: Elasmobranchii
- Division: Selachii
- Order: Lamniformes
- Family: Mitsukurinidae
- Genus: †Anomotodon; Arambourg, 1952

Species
- A. cravenensis A. genaulti A. hermani A. kozlovi A. laevis A. multidenticulata A. novus A. plicatus A. principialis A. sheppeyensis A. toddi

= Anomotodon =

Anomotodon Temporal range: Early Cretaceous to Late Eocene

Extinct genus of sharks

Anomotodon is an extinct genus of shark related to the extant goblin shark (Mitsukurina owstoni). The distribution of Anomotodon fossils is worldwide, in formations indicating that members of the genus lived from the Early Cretaceous epoch through the Eocene epoch, and perhaps through the Oligocene as well. Described species include A. novus, A. plicatus, A. principalis, and A. multidenticula.

== See also ==
- Scapanorhynchus
