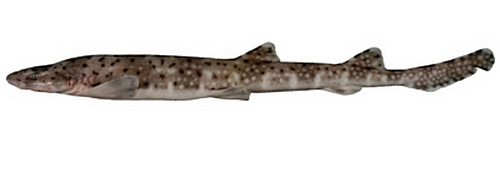

Conservation status
- Data Deficient (IUCN 3.1)

Scientific classification
- Kingdom: Animalia
- Phylum: Chordata
- Class: Chondrichthyes
- Subclass: Elasmobranchii
- Division: Selachii
- Order: Carcharhiniformes
- Family: Atelomycteridae
- Genus: Atelomycterus
- Species: A. marnkalha

Binomial name
- Atelomycterus marnkalha Jacobsen & Bennett, 2007

= Eastern banded catshark =

Species of shark

The eastern banded catshark (Atelomycterus marnkalha) is a species of catshark, and part of the family Scyliorhinidae. It is found along the northeastern coast of Australia.
