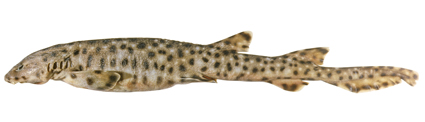

Conservation status
- Least Concern (IUCN 3.1)

Scientific classification
- Kingdom: Animalia
- Phylum: Chordata
- Class: Chondrichthyes
- Subclass: Elasmobranchii
- Division: Selachii
- Order: Carcharhiniformes
- Family: Atelomycteridae
- Genus: Aulohalaelurus
- Species: A. labiosus

Binomial name
- Aulohalaelurus labiosus (Waite, 1905)
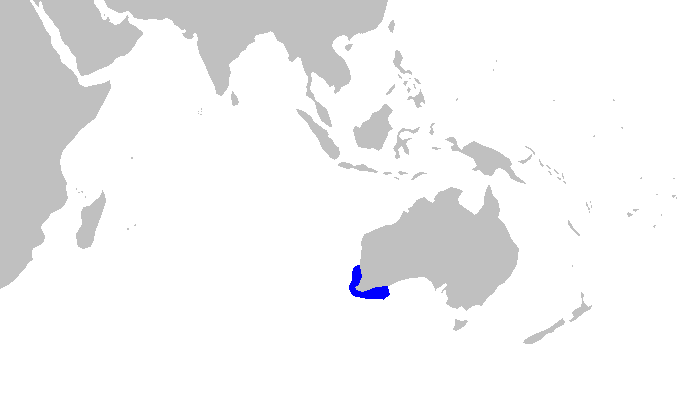
- Range of the Australian blackspotted catshark

= Australian blackspotted catshark =

Species of shark

The Australian blackspotted catshark (Aulohalaelurus labiosus) is a coloured catshark belonging to the family Atelomycteridae in the order Carcharhiniformes. They are commonly found in shallow coasts and offshore reefs in western Australia.
