= Narrowtail catshark =

Conservation status
- Least Concern (IUCN 3.1)

Scientific classification
- Kingdom: Animalia
- Phylum: Chordata
- Class: Chondrichthyes
- Subclass: Elasmobranchii
- Division: Selachii
- Order: Carcharhiniformes
- Family: Atelomycteridae
- Genus: Schroederichthys
- Species: S. maculatus

Binomial name
- Schroederichthys maculatus S. Springer, 1966
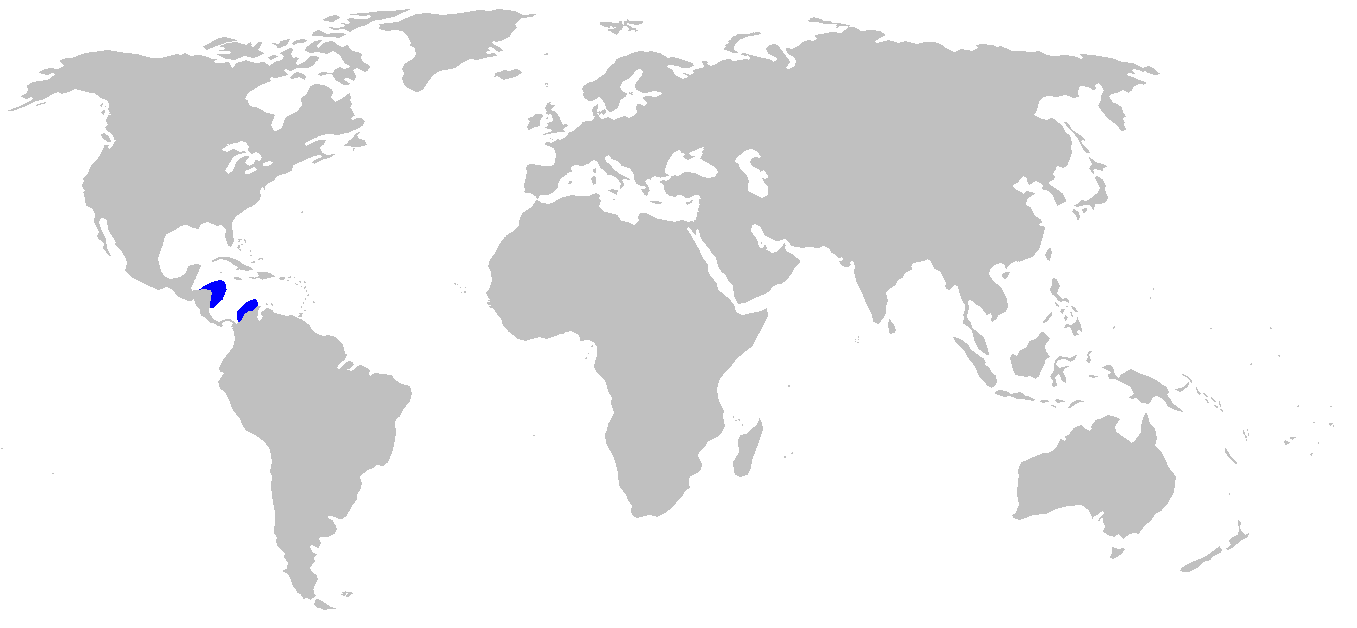

Species of shark

The narrowtail catshark (Schroederichthys maculatus) is a catshark of the family Scyliorhinidae, found off the coasts of Honduras and Nicaragua, between latitudes 18° N and 10° N, at depths between 190 and 410 m (620 and 1,350 ft). It can grow up to a length of 35 cm (14 in). The reproduction of this catshark is oviparous.

== Description ==
The narrowtail catshark is very elongated both as an adult and as a juvenile, growing to a length of about 35 cm (14 in). The dorsal surface and flanks are light grey or tan, spotted with white. Juveniles have six to nine light brown saddle-shaped markings dorsally, but these fade in adulthood. The underparts are pale.

== Distribution ==
The narrowtail catshark is endemic to the Caribbean Sea where it is found off the coasts of Honduras, Nicaragua and Colombia, and in the area of sea between Honduras and Jamaica. It occupies the edge of the continental shelf and the upper parts of the slope, its depth range being between about 190 and 410 m (620 and 1,350 ft). It prefers to be above seabeds composed of fine calcareous materials.

== Ecology ==
The narrowtail catshark is a demersal species, cruising along close to the seabed and feeding mainly on small fish and cephalopods. One specimen was found to have algae in its stomach. This catshark is oviparous, the female probably producing one egg in each oviduct, and the developing embryos depending on the egg yolk for nourishment. Because this species retains the same body proportions at all ages while other members of the genus do not, it has been suggested that it is a pedomorphic dwarf, retaining its juvenile form and maturing at a much smaller size than other members of the genus.

== Status ==
Very little is known about this shark and its ecology. It has a restricted range but is subject to little fishing pressure because there are no commercial trawl fisheries operating in the Caribbean Sea at the depths at which this fish lives. In the absence of known threats, the population is presumed to be stable, and the International Union for Conservation of Nature has assessed its conservation status as being of "least concern".
