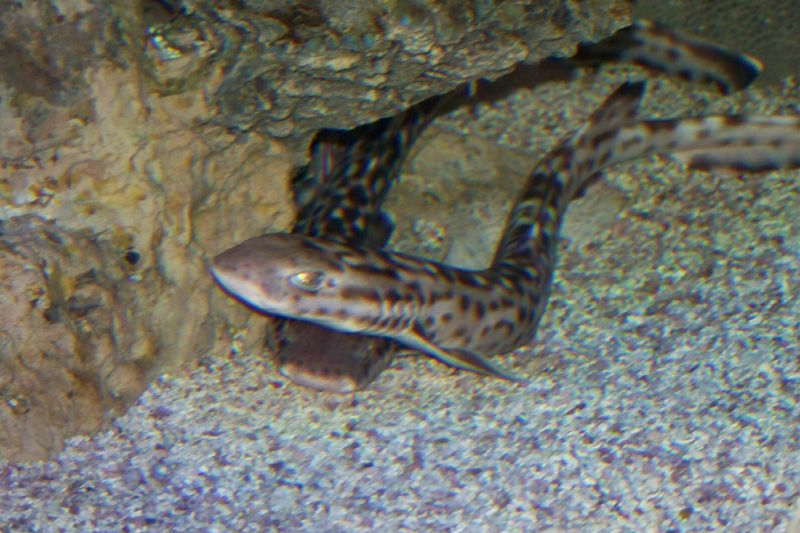
- Coral catshark (Atelomycterus marmoratus)

Scientific classification
- Kingdom: Animalia
- Phylum: Chordata
- Class: Chondrichthyes
- Subclass: Elasmobranchii
- Division: Selachii
- Order: Carcharhiniformes
- Family: Atelomycteridae
- Genus: Atelomycterus; Garman, 1913

Type species
- Scyllium marmoratum Anonymous, referred to E. T. Bennett, 1830

= Atelomycterus =

Genus of sharks

Atelomycterus is a genus of coloured catsharks in the family Atelomycteridae.

== Species ==
There are currently six recognized species in this genus:

- Atelomycterus baliensis W. T. White, Last & Dharmadi, 2005 (Bali catshark)
- Atelomycterus erdmanni Fahmi & W. T. White, 2015 (spotted-belly catshark)
- Atelomycterus fasciatus Compagno & Stevens, 1993 (banded sand catshark)
- Atelomycterus macleayi Whitley, 1939 (Australian marbled catshark)
- Atelomycterus marmoratus Anonymous, referred to E. T. Bennett, 1830 (coral catshark)
- Atelomycterus marnkalha Jacobsen & M. B. Bennett, 2007 (eastern banded catshark)
