= Kakichi Mitsukuri =

Japanese zoologist (1857–1909)

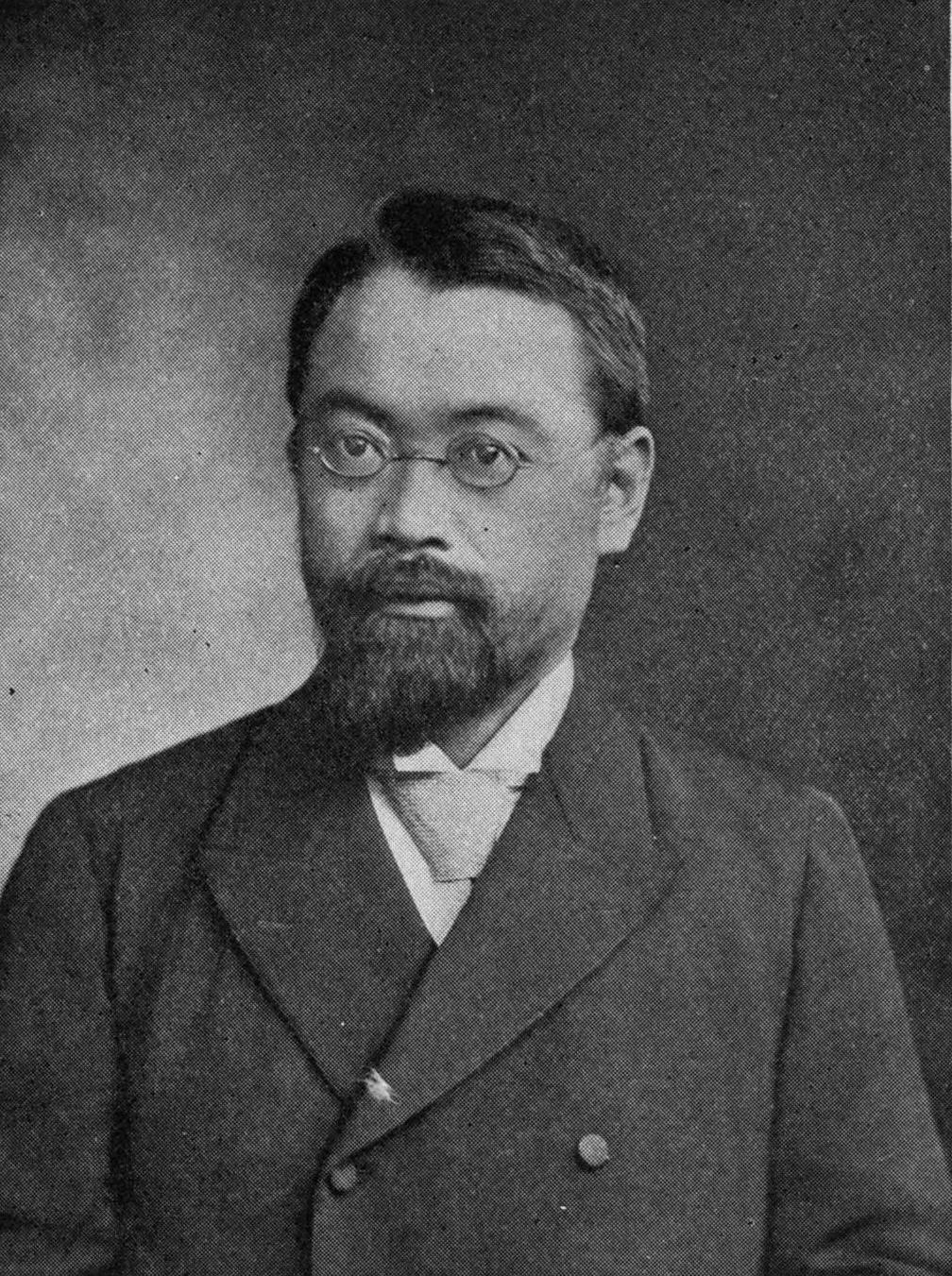
- Born: January 15, 1857; Japan Edo (now Tokyo)
- Died: September 16, 1909 (aged 52)
- Other name: 箕作 佳吉
- Occupation: zoologist

Kakichi Mitsukuri (箕作 佳吉, Mitsukuri Kakichi; January 15, 1857 – September 16, 1909) was a Japanese zoologist.

== Biography ==
Kakichi Mitsukuri was born in Edo. In 1873 he came to the United States, where he received a Ph.D. degree from Yale in 1879 and from Johns Hopkins in 1883. He was appointed professor at the College of Science of the Imperial University of Tokyo in 1882 and councilor of the university in 1893.

In 1896, he was made head of the fur seal commission (or a "member of the fur seal protection zone council" (Note: Ottosei hogo-ku hyōgikai iin (オットセイ保護区評議会委員; "member of the fur seal protection zone council")))) and sent as the Japanese delegate to the International Fur Seal Conference of 1897 held in the United States, alongside Shirō Fujita who had been given the proxy title of acting Fisheries Bureau chief and although they were charged with signing on behalf of Japan, a treaty with the United States and Great Britain, a formal accord treaty could not be concluded. While in the U.S. in 1897, he was invited by the Lowell Institute in Boston and gave lectures on "Social life in Japan", translated into French in 1922 as "La vie sociale au Japon".

In 1901 he became dean of the College of Science of Tokyo University, and in 1907 he was decorated with the Order of the Sacred Treasure (2nd Class, in 1906) in recognition of public service. In later life his time was largely occupied with administrative duties. He was regarded not only as one of the leading zoologists of Japan, but also as very influential in public life. His most important zoological publications, a series of papers on the embryology of the turtles, appeared at intervals from 1886 to 1896. Mitsukuri also brought the "holotype" goblin shark to the California Academy of Sciences where the genus was named after himself and Asian wildlife collector Alan Owston, with the scientific name Mitsukurina owstonii.

== Works ==
- Mitsukuri, Kakichi (1906), "The cultivation of marine and fresh-water animals in Japan", in Rogers, Howard Jason (ed.), Congress of arts and science: Universal exposition, St. Louis, 1904, Houghton, Mifflin and company, pp. 694–732

== Taxa described by him ==
- See Category:Taxa named by Kakichi Mitsukuri

== Taxa named in his honor ==
- Mitsukurina is a genus of mackerel shark in the family Mitsukurinidae. It contains one extant species, the goblin shark (M. owstoni) and more extinct species. The genus was described by American ichthyologist David Starr Jordan in 1898 and named in his honor.
