= Marsupiobothrium gobelinus =

Scientific classification
- Kingdom: Animalia
- Phylum: Platyhelminthes
- Class: Cestoda
- Order: Tetraphyllidea
- Family: Phyllobothriidae
- Genus: Marsupiobothrium
- Species: M. gobelinus

Binomial name
- Marsupiobothrium gobelinus Caira & Runkle, 1993

Species of flatworm

Marsupiobothrium gobelinus is a species of tapeworms with an unknown taxonomic affinity.

It can easily be distinguished from the other members of its family by its bothridial peduncles, longer in comparison to other family members. Its lacks arcuate cylindrical pads on the posterior bothridial margins. The tapeworm has a marginal, distinct apical scolex rather than a submarginal, diffuse apical sucker on each bothridium.

This species was first described (along with Litobothrium amsichensis) from a specimen collected from the spiral valve digestive organ of a goblin shark (Mitsukurina owstoni) caught in New South Wales in Australia.
