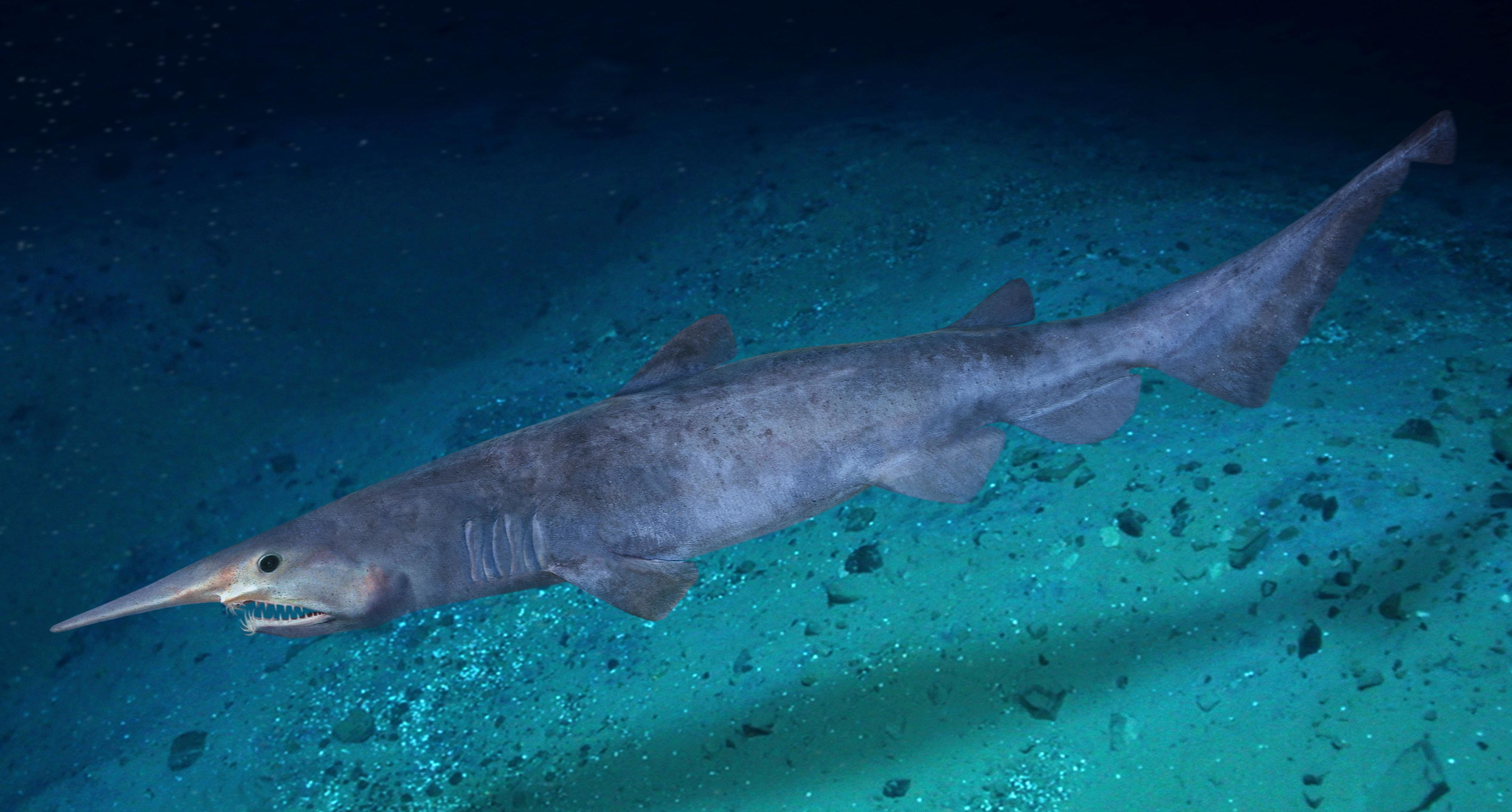
- Specimen of extant goblin shark
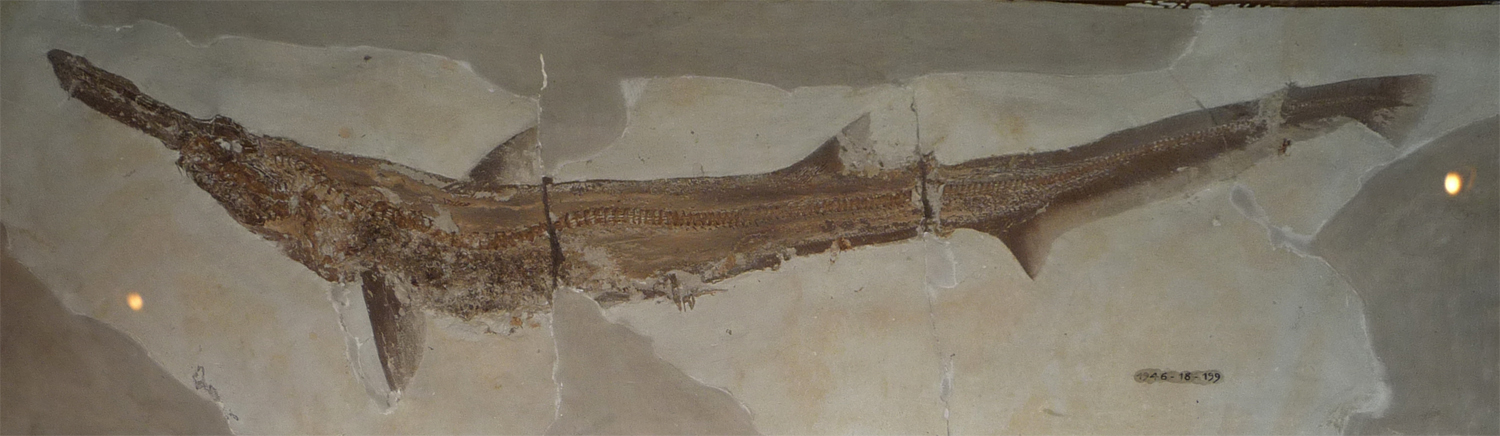
- Fossil of Scapanorhynchus from the early Late Cretaceous of Lebanon

Scientific classification
- Kingdom: Animalia
- Phylum: Chordata
- Class: Chondrichthyes
- Subclass: Elasmobranchii
- Division: Selachii
- Order: Lamniformes
- Family: Mitsukurinidae; D. S. Jordan, 1898

Genera
- Anomotodon †; Mitsukurina D. S. Jordan, 1898; Protoscapanorhynchus †; Scapanorhynchus †; Woellsteinia †

Synonyms
- Scapanorhynchidae

= Mitsukurinidae =

Mitsukurinidae Temporal range: 146–0 Ma Early Cretaceous to Present

Family of sharks

Mitsukurinidae is a family of sharks with one living genus, Mitsukurina, and four fossil genera: Anomotodon, Protoscapanorhynchus, Scapanorhynchus, and Woellsteinia, though some taxonomists consider Scapanorhynchus to be a synonym of Mitsukurina. The only known living species is the goblin shark, Mitsukurina owstoni.

This family of sharks is named in honour of Kakichi Mitsukuri who brought the holotype of the family's type species to David Starr Jordan to be scientifically described.

The most distinctive characteristic of the goblin sharks is the long, trowel-shaped, beak-like snout, much longer than those of other sharks. Its long snout is covered with ampullae of Lorenzini that enable it to sense minute electric fields produced by nearby prey, which it can snatch up by rapidly extending its jaws. They also possess long, protrusible jaws. When the jaws are retracted, the shark resembles a sand tiger shark, Carcharias taurus, with an unusually long nose. Its nose resembles the nose of a goblin, which is how it received its name. These sharks have only been seen about 50 times since their discovery in 1897.

== Geographic range ==
Originally caught in Japan, the range is wide, but not evenly distributed. The majority of known specimens come from bays of Japan while the rest are mostly found off New Zealand, southern Africa, and in the Eastern Atlantic and Indian Oceans. Two specimens have been taken off the Mississippi and California coasts of the United States. Though this probably encompasses the range of Mitsukurina owstoni, sightings are so rare and widespread that the presence of goblin sharks could extend well beyond these areas. (Duffy, 1997; Martin, 1999)

== Behavior ==
They are found in the open ocean from near the surface, down to depths of at least 4265 feet (1300 m). Scientists believe that Goblin Sharks are solitary, just like many other shark species. They also think that the fish are most active in the morning and evening. The Goblin Shark primarily feeds on teleost fishes such as rattails and dragonfish. It also eats cephalopods and crustaceans, such as decapods and isopods.
