= Narrowmouthed catshark =

Conservation status
- Least Concern (IUCN 3.1)

Scientific classification
- Kingdom: Animalia
- Phylum: Chordata
- Class: Chondrichthyes
- Subclass: Elasmobranchii
- Division: Selachii
- Order: Carcharhiniformes
- Family: Atelomycteridae
- Genus: Schroederichthys
- Species: S. bivius

Binomial name
- Schroederichthys bivius (Smith, 1838)
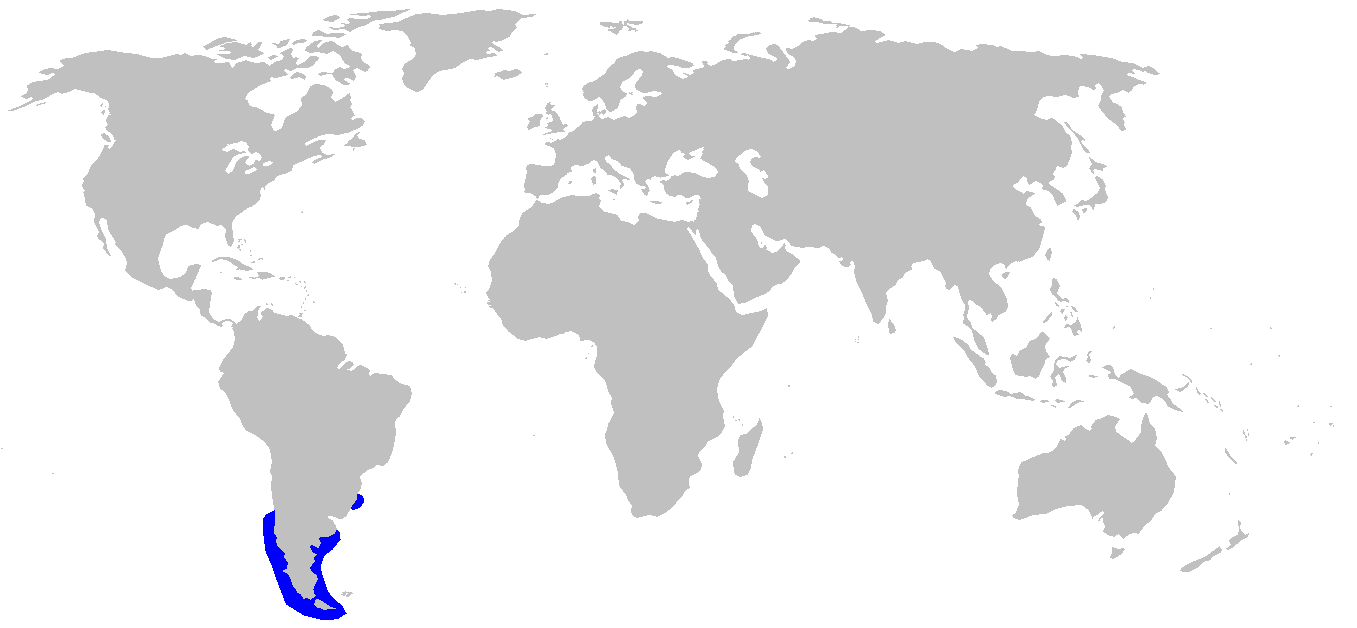

Synonyms
- Halaelurus bivius (Smith, 1838); Scyllium bivium Smith 1838

Species of shark

The narrowmouthed catshark (Schroederichthys bivius) is a coloured catshark belonging to the family Atelomycteridae, found from central Chile around the Straits of Magellan, to Argentina between latitudes 23° S and 56° S, at depths down to about 180 m (600 ft) in the Atlantic Ocean and about 360 m (1,200 ft) in the Pacific. It can grow to a length of up to 70 cm (28 in). The reproduction of this catshark is oviparous.

== Taxonomy ==
The narrowmouthed catshark was first formally described as Scyllium bivium in 1838 in the book Systematische Beschreibung der Plagiostomen written by Johannes Peter Müller and Friedrich Gustav Jakob Henle, in which they ascribe the name to the Scottish surgeon and zoologist Andrew Smith. Smith gave the type locality as the Cape of Good Hope when he published the name in the South African Quarterly Journal of October 1831. This species is classified within the genus Schroederichthys which is currently included in the family Atelomycteridae, the coloured catsharks.

== Description ==
As a juvenile, the narrowmouthed catshark is elongated and very slender, but as it grows, its proportions change and it becomes rather more thickset. Its adult length can reach 70 cm (28 in) or more. The snout is rounded and slender and the front nasal flaps are narrow and lobed. This fish displays heterodont dentition; the mouth is long in both sexes, but is longer and narrower in males, with teeth that are twice the height of those of females. The general colour of the dorsal surface of both sexes is greyish-brown, with seven or eight dark brown saddles. Some large dark spots are scattered along the body but do not occur on the saddles. There are also many small white spots on the upper half of the body.

== Distribution ==
The narrowmouthed catshark is endemic to the coasts of South America, between latitudes 23° S and 56° S. In the southwestern Atlantic Ocean its range extends from southern Brazil, southwards to the Beagle Channel and in the southeasterly Pacific Ocean, southwards from northern Chile. Its depth range is from the surface down to about 180 m (600 ft) in the Atlantic Ocean and about 360 m (1,200 ft) in the Pacific.

== Ecology ==
The narrowmouthed catshark is a demersal fish, feeding mostly on crustaceans and some fish. In the Beagle Channel in the summer it has been found to feed almost exclusively on the squat lobster, Munida gregaria, but in other places its diet is more varied.

The females are oviparous, the eggs being laid in egg cases which are attached to the seabed in estuaries and sheltered waters by tendrils. The newly hatched juvenile fish use these sheltered areas as nurseries.

== Status ==
The International Union for Conservation of Nature has assessed this species as "least concern".
