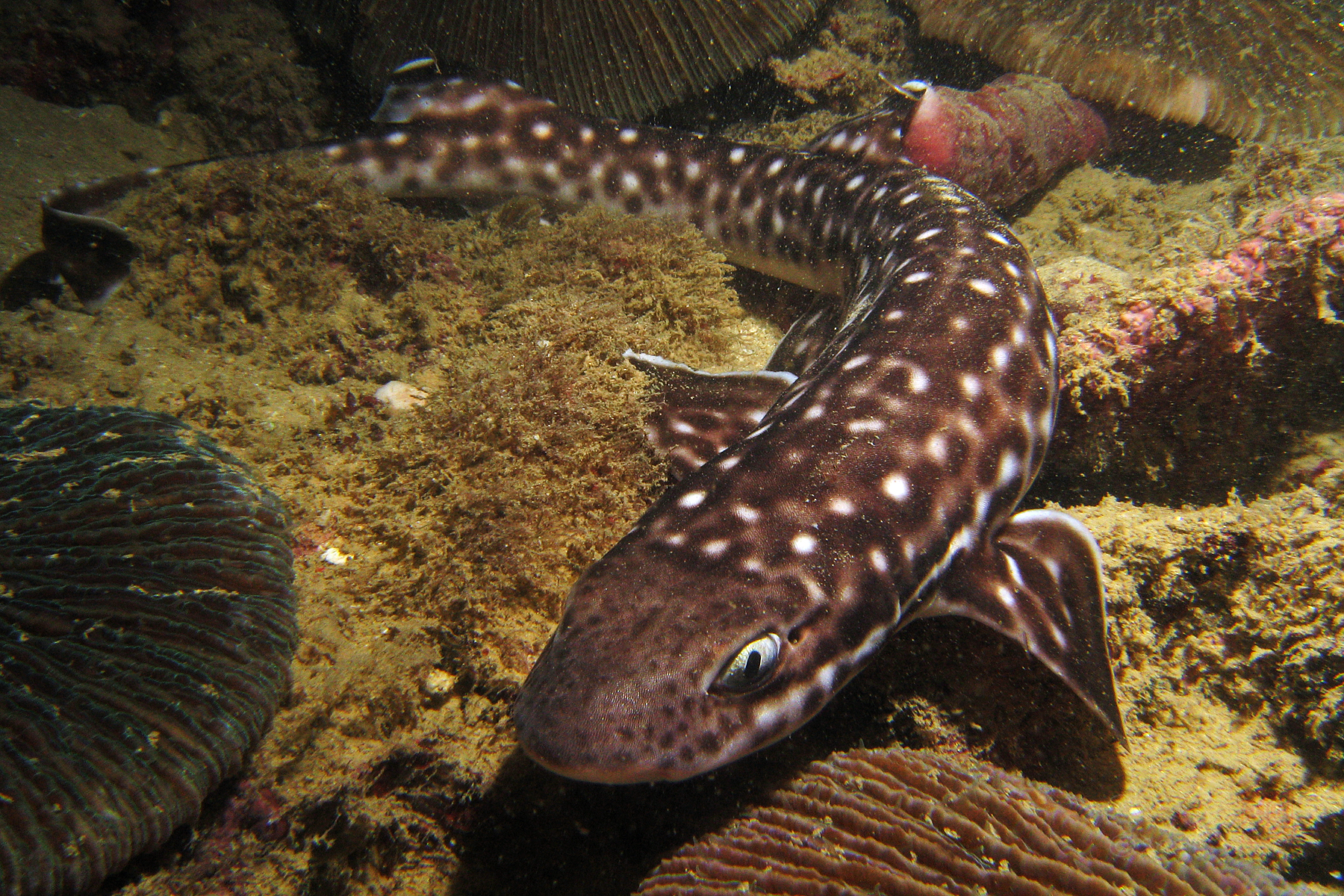

Conservation status
- Near Threatened (IUCN 3.1)

Scientific classification
- Kingdom: Animalia
- Phylum: Chordata
- Class: Chondrichthyes
- Subclass: Elasmobranchii
- Division: Selachii
- Order: Carcharhiniformes
- Family: Atelomycteridae
- Genus: Atelomycterus
- Species: A. marmoratus

Binomial name
- Atelomycterus marmoratus (Anonymous [E. T. Bennett], 1830)
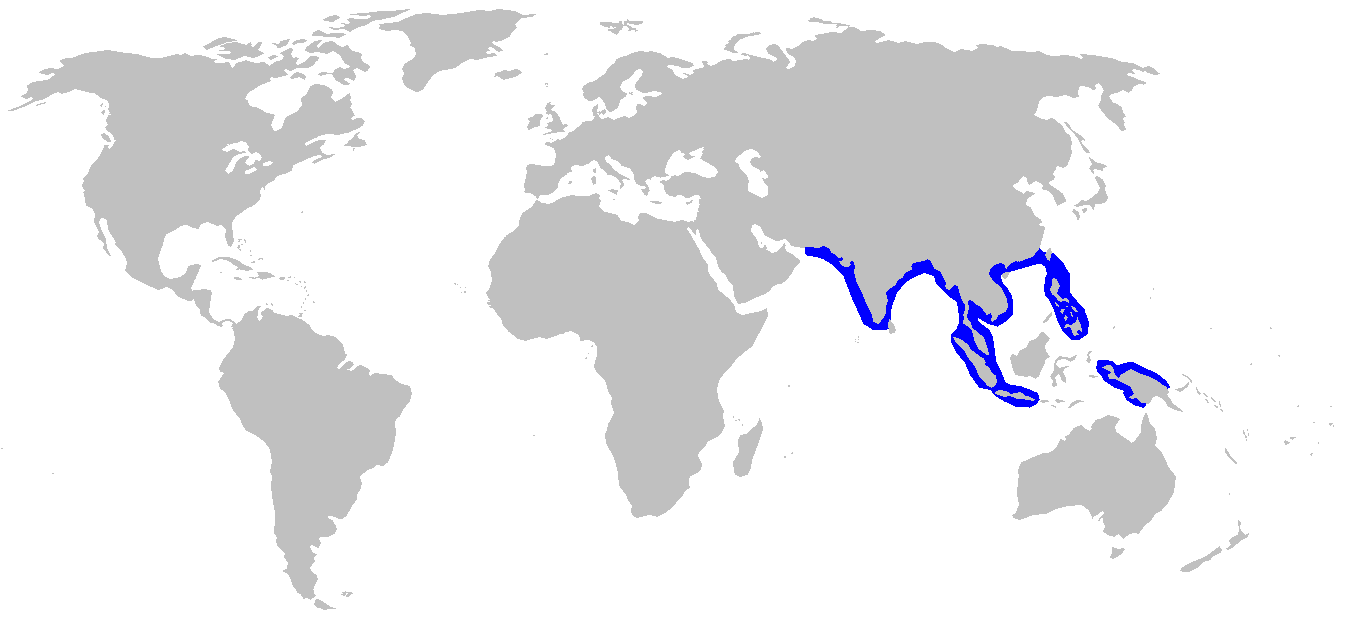
- Range of the coral catshark

Synonyms
- Scyllium maculatum Gray, 1830; Scyllium marmoratum Anonymous [Bennett], 1830; Scyllium pardus Temminck, 1838

= Coral catshark =

Species of shark

The coral catshark (Atelomycterus marmoratus) is a species of coloured catshark belonging to the family Atelomycteridae. It is common on shallow coral reefs across the Indo-West Pacific, from Pakistan to New Guinea. Reaching up to 70 cm (28 in) in length, the coral catshark has an extremely slender body, a short head and tail, and two dorsal fins that are angled backwards. It can be identified by the numerous black and white spots on its back, sides, and fins, which often merge to form horizontal bars. Furthermore, adult males have distinctively long and thin claspers.

Reclusive and inactive during the day, at dusk and at night, the coral catshark actively forages for small, bottom-living invertebrates and bony fishes. Its slender form allows it to access tight spaces on the reef. It is oviparous; females lay purse-shaped egg capsules two at a time on the bottom, and the young hatch after 4–6 months. This small, harmless shark adapts well to captivity and has reproduced in the aquarium; it is regarded as one of the most suitable shark species for private aquarists. The coral catshark is a minor bycatch of reef fisheries, with minimal commercial value. Increasing fishing activity and extensive habitat degradation occur within its range, leading to concern over its population and its assessment as near threatened by the International Union for Conservation of Nature.

== Taxonomy ==
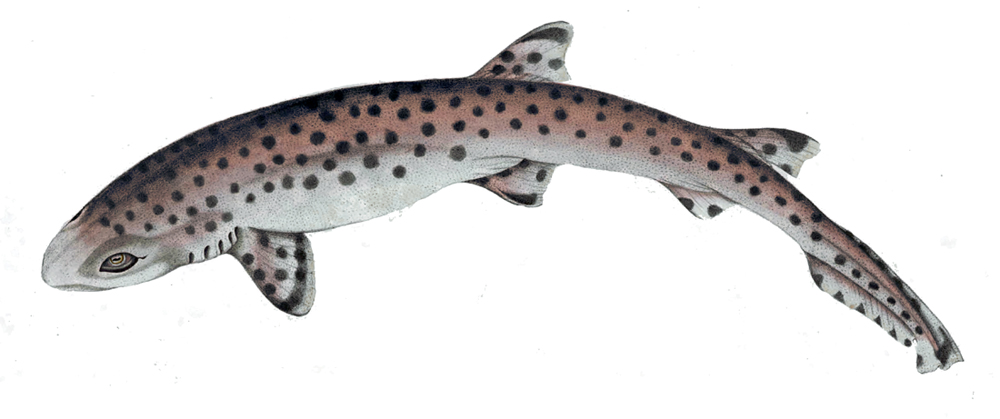
Early illustration of a coral catshark from Illustrations of Indian Zoology (1832)

The coral catshark was first described by an anonymous author, usually thought to be English zoologist Edward Turner Bennett, in the 1830 Memoir of the Life and Public Services of Sir Thomas Stamford Raffles. Its original name was Scyllium marmoratum, from the Latin marmoratus meaning "marbled". Hence, another common name for this species is marbled catshark. In 1913, Samuel Garman placed it in his newly created genus Atelomycterus. The type specimen was caught off Sumatra, and is thought to have been lost.

== Description ==
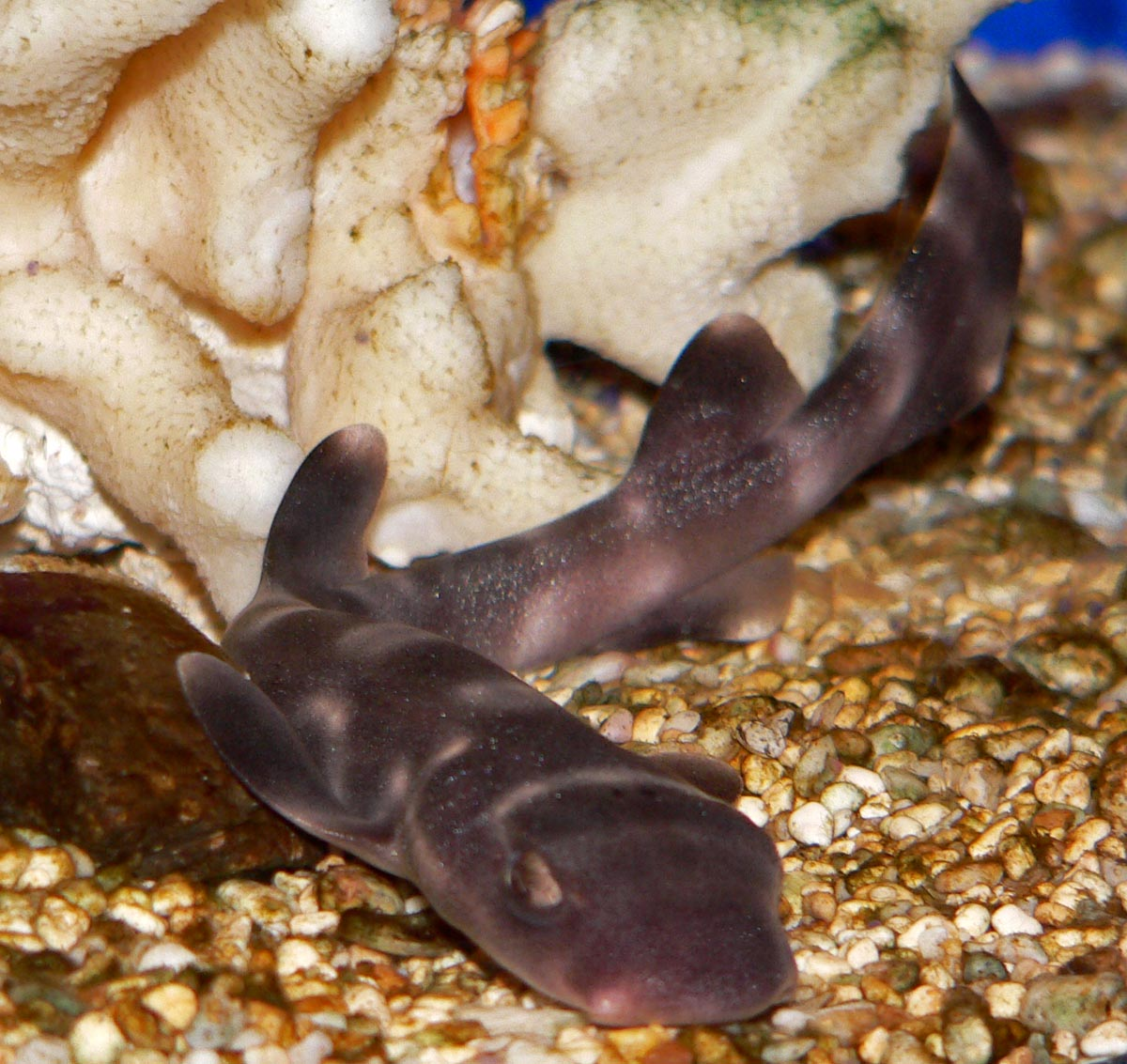
Characteristic traits of the coral catshark include its very thin body and pattern of dark and light spots.

The coral catshark has a very slender, cylindrical, firm body and a short, narrow head. The snout is short and slightly flattened, with a blunt tip. The eyes are horizontally oval and protected by rudimentary nictitating membranes; behind are spiracles of moderate size. The large nostrils are mostly covered by broad, triangular flaps of skin on their anterior margins, leaving small incurrent and excurrent openings. The nasal flaps reach the mouth, obscuring a pair of broad grooves connecting the excurrent openings and the mouth. The long, angular mouth has very long furrows at the corners extending onto both the upper and lower jaws. The small teeth have a narrow central cusp flanked by 1–2 cusplets on both sides. There are five pairs of gill slits.

The pectoral fins are fairly large. The first dorsal fin is angled backwards and originates over the rear of the pelvic fin bases; the second dorsal fin is similarly shaped and slightly smaller than the first, and originates over the front quarter of the anal fin base. Adult males have thin, tapering claspers that extend about two-thirds of the distance between the pelvic and anal fins. The anal fin is much smaller than the dorsal fins. The caudal fin is relatively short and broad, with an indistinct lower lobe and a ventral notch near the tip of the upper lobe. The skin is thick and covered by well-calcified dermal denticles. Extremely variable in coloration, the coral catshark lacks prominent saddle markings, but rather has many black and white spots on a grayish background. These spots often run together to form horizontal dashes, which include white tips on the dorsal fins and a white stripe through the gill slits. The underside is plain white. This species grows up to 70 cm (28 in) long.

== Distribution and habitat ==
The most widely distributed member of its genus, the coral catshark can be found from Pakistan and India to Southeast Asia and Taiwan, including the Philippines and New Guinea. Its range extends as far north as the Ryukyu Islands. Early records from Australian waters are in fact of the related Australian marbled catshark (A. macleayi) and banded sand catshark (A. fasciatus). Common and bottom-dwelling in nature, the coral catshark inhabits inshore coral reefs at depths not exceeding 15 m (49 ft).

== Biology and ecology ==
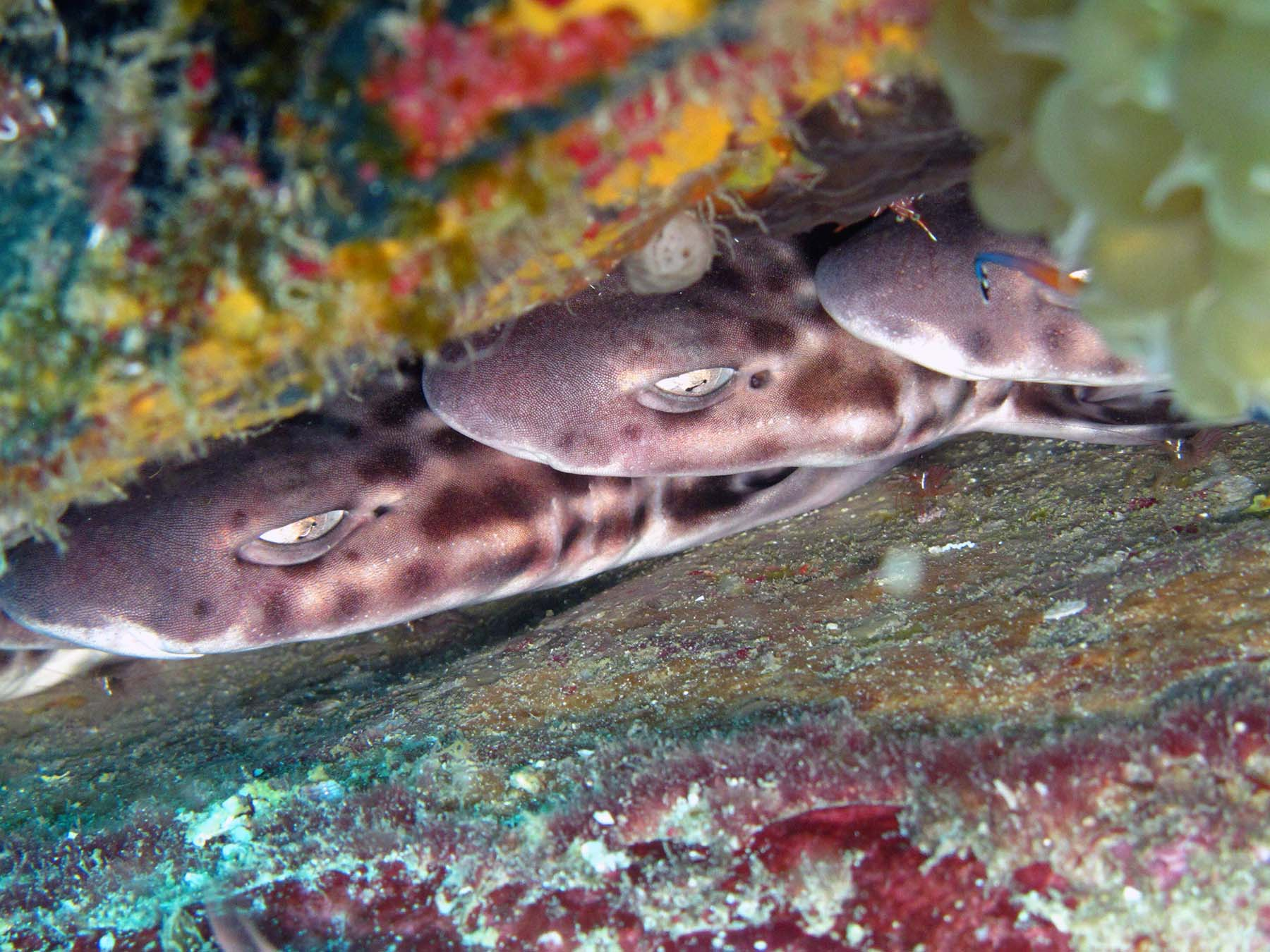
The coral catshark can usually be found resting and hidden in daytime.

The elongated body of the coral catshark allows it to move into and through small spaces in the reef environment, though it does not "crawl" using its pectoral and pelvic fins like the epaulette shark (Hemiscyllium ocellatum). It is primarily crepuscular and nocturnal, with active foraging activity beginning in the afternoon and ending before sunrise. During the day, it generally hides under shelter such as reef overhangs or sunken logs, either singly or in groups. Individual sharks may return to the same hiding place on successive days. This species feeds on small benthic invertebrates and bony fishes; captive specimens have been observed lying still and lunging at prey that comes into range.

The coral catshark is oviparous, with the female producing eggs two at a time. Each egg is enclosed in a purse-shaped capsule roughly 6–8 cm (2.4–3.1 in) long and 2 cm (0.79 in) wide, with two constricted "waists"; one end of the capsule is squared off, while the other bears two short "horns" that may terminate in short tendrils. The female deposits the eggs on the bottom, rather than attaching them to vertical structures. The capsule is light brown when freshly laid and darkens over time. The eggs hatch in 4–6 months at 26 °C (79 °F). Newly hatched sharks measure 10–13 cm (3.9–5.1 in) long and have a contrasting dorsal pattern of light and dark vertical bars, sometimes with black and white dots. At 3 months old, the young have grown by 4–5 cm (1.6–2.0 in) and their coloration has faded to match that of the adults. Males and females attain sexual maturity around 47–62 cm (19–24 in) and 49–57 cm (19–22 in), respectively.

== Human interactions ==
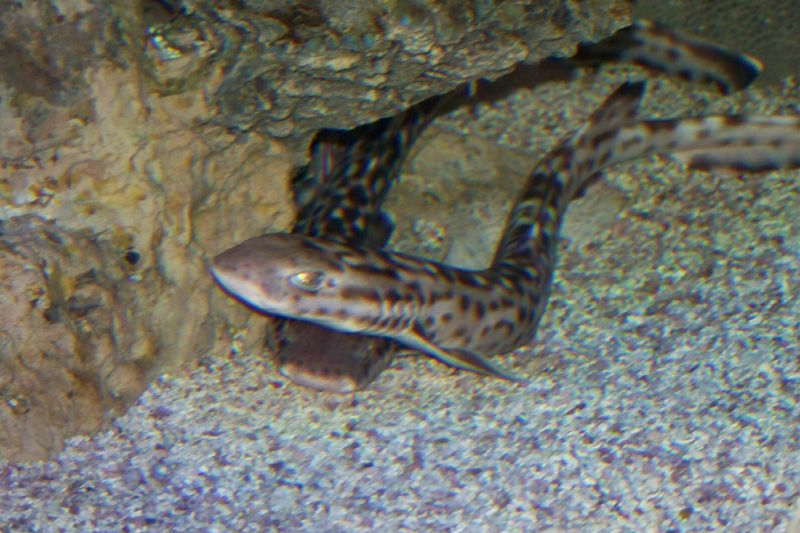
Coral catsharks (Atelomycterus marmoratus) at the Newport Aquarium.

Common in the aquarium trade, the coral catshark is regarded as well-suited to larger home aquaria because of its small size, hardiness, and attractive appearance. It requires a tank at least 3 metres (118 in) long, with sufficiently deep hiding places. This shark tends to be more aggressive than other small sharks, often attacking tankmates larger than it can consume. Captive individuals have been known to live up to 20 years, and the species has reproduced in the aquarium.

Small numbers of coral catsharks are caught incidentally by artisanal reef fishers in eastern Indonesia and likely elsewhere; it may be sold for meat or processed for fishmeal and liver oil, but its size limits its economic importance. The International Union for Conservation of Nature has assessed this species as near threatened, and notes that with more data, it may meet the criteria for vulnerable. It is likely threatened by the rising fishing pressure throughout its range, and by widespread habitat degradation from blast fishing, pollution, and the mining of coral for use as building material.
