= Schroederichthys =

Scientific classification
- Kingdom: Animalia
- Phylum: Chordata
- Class: Chondrichthyes
- Subclass: Elasmobranchii
- Division: Selachii
- Order: Carcharhiniformes
- Family: Atelomycteridae
- Genus: Schroederichthys; S. Springer, 1838

Type species
- Schroederichthys maculatus Springer, 1966

Genus of sharks

Schroederichthys is a genus of coloured catsharks in the family Atelomycteridae.

== Species ==
- Schroederichthys bivius (Smith, 1838) (narrowmouthed catshark)
- Schroederichthys chilensis (Guichenot, 1848) (redspotted catshark)
- Schroederichthys maculatus S. Springer, 1966 (narrowtail catshark)
- Schroederichthys saurisqualus Soto, 2001 (lizard catshark)
- Schroederichthys tenuis S. Springer, 1966 (slender catshark)

== Etymology ==
The genus name Schroederichthys honors ichthyologist William Charles Schroeder.
