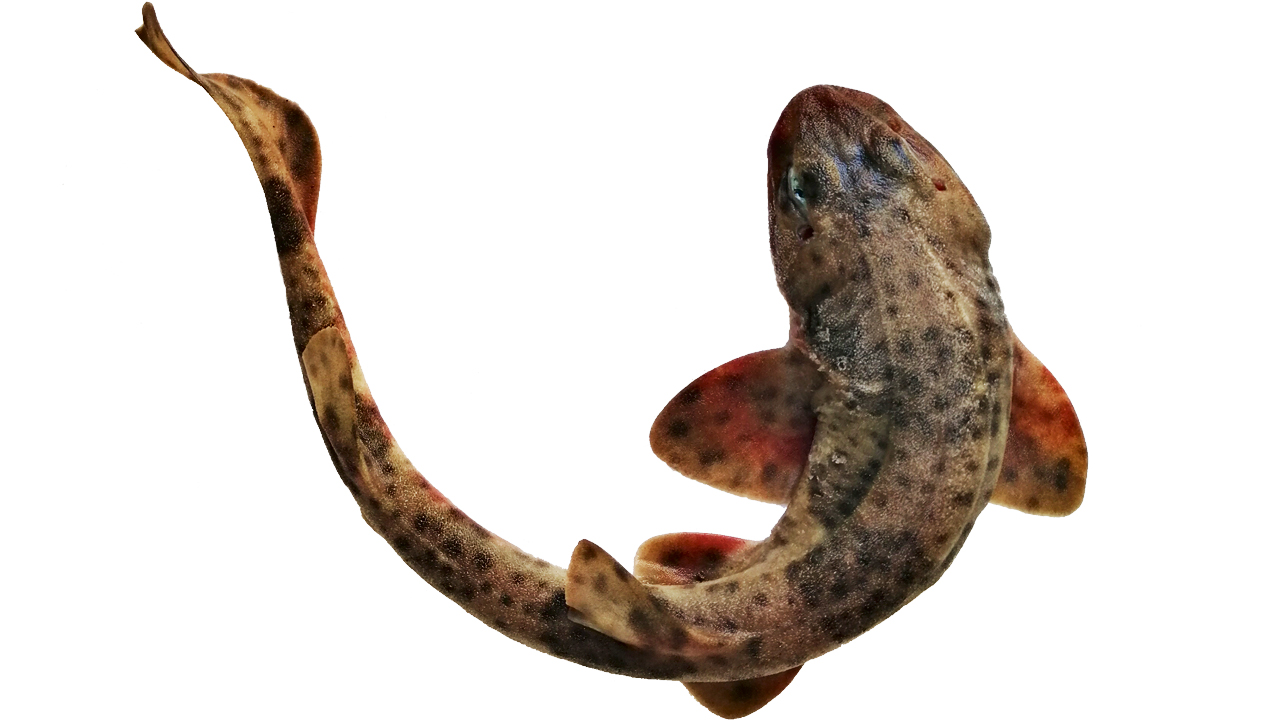

Conservation status
- Least Concern (IUCN 3.1)

Scientific classification
- Kingdom: Animalia
- Phylum: Chordata
- Class: Chondrichthyes
- Subclass: Elasmobranchii
- Division: Selachii
- Order: Carcharhiniformes
- Family: Atelomycteridae
- Genus: Schroederichthys
- Species: S. chilensis

Binomial name
- Schroederichthys chilensis (Guichenot, 1848)
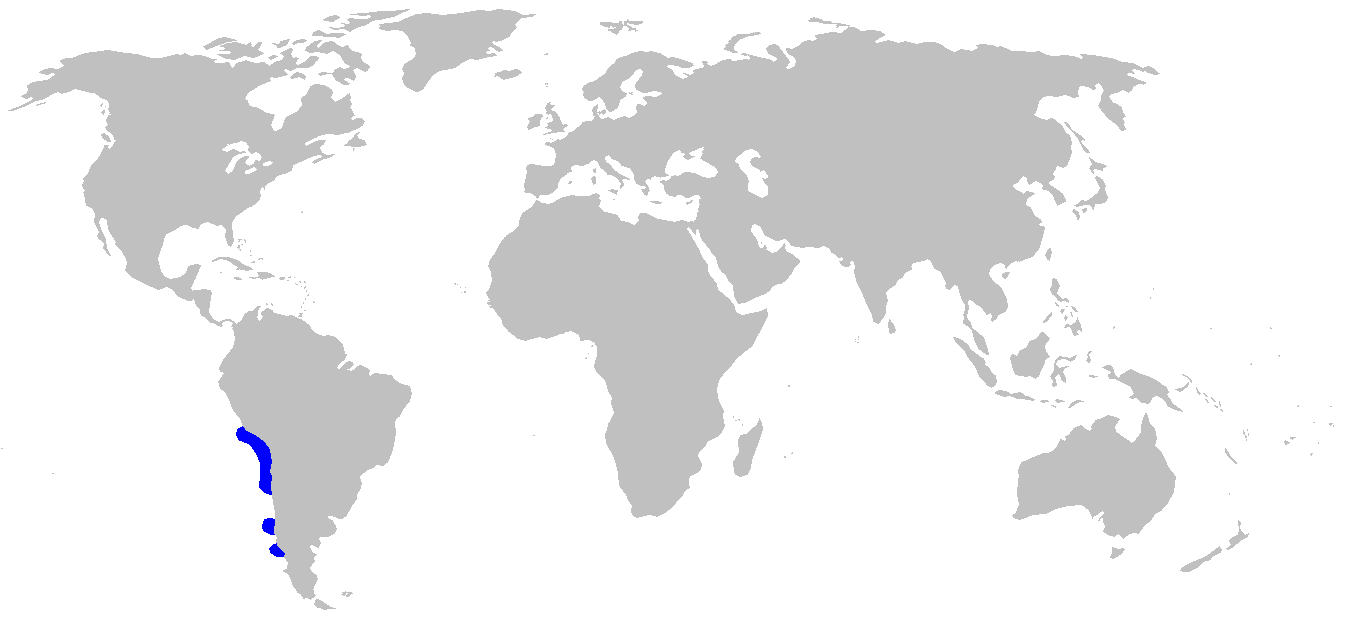

= Redspotted catshark =

Species of shark

The redspotted catshark (Schroederichthys chilensis), also known as the Chilean catshark, is a species of catshark commonly found in the coastal waters of the southeastern Pacific, from central Peru to southern Chile. They are typically found in the rocky sublittoral areas at the edge of the continental shelf, in waters down to 100 m in depth. They spend the spring, summer, and fall in rocky subtidal areas, but winter in deeper offshore waters due to the strong currents at that time of year.

== Description ==
Redspotted catsharks range in length from 30 to 66 cm, although these sizes are taken from captured sharks, and it is believed that they may grow larger than this.

Their bodies are elongate and sleek, typical of the catshark family. Their dorsal side is a dark reddish brown with dark saddle patterns on their side. Their ventral sides are a creamy white with reddish spots. Redspotted catsharks have two dorsal fins, with the first dorsal axil over the pelvic region. Their dorsal fins do not have spines, and their tails have no upward bend.

Redspotted catsharks have multicuspid teeth. However, males typically have longer teeth with fewer cusps. This is believed to aid in courtship biting.

== Behavior ==
Redspotted catsharks are solitary, nocturnal creatures. They stay in caves and crevices during the day and emerge at night to feed. They are migratory. However, they live most of the year near the edge of the continental shelf.

Communication specific to the redspotted catshark is unknown. However, as with most other sharks, including other members of the family Scyliorhinidae, it is believed that they have a well-developed sense of smell, and that they are electroreceptive, which allows them to detect electricity emitted by other animals, and may also allow them to detect magnetic fields, which aids in navigation.

Redspotted catsharks are host to trypanosomes, parasites that are passed into the catsharks' bloodstream through leeches.

There are no known predators to the catshark, although juveniles typically spend their early life in the deeper offshore waters. This is believed to be to avoid predators, although what those predators are is unknown. Breeding and oviposition seem to occur throughout the year in an annual cycle. The paucity of ovigerous females during fall probably indicates that eggs were laid during summer, when massive depositions of egg-cases occurred on fronds of the subtidal brown kelp 'Lessonia trabeculata'.

=== Feeding ===
Redspotted catsharks feed on organisms that dwell on the rocky bottom near the continental shelf. Their primary food sources are various species of crabs and the rhynchocinetid rock shrimp Rhynchocinetes typus. Redspotted catsharks are an important predator within their ecosystem. They have a large influence on commercially fished benthic organisms that dwell in the rocky near-shore areas.

The research of presence/absence effect of kelp Lessonia trabeculata on the isotopic niche of redspotted catshark present that males were characterized by higher trophic position and enriched carbon sources compared to females in locations where kelp was present. In contrast, males and females were characterized by similar isotopic niche in absence of kelp. These differences are most probably an effect of higher prey diversity associated with microhabitats generated by kelp forests that allow sexual segregation of isotopic niche. Therefore, extensive kelp harvest may cause significant effects in isotopic niche and nutritional status of adult redspotted catshark and may negatively affect its populations.

=== Reproduction ===
Redspotted catsharks are oviparous. Breeding occurs in individuals in an annual cycle. However, they mate seasonally, typically in spring and winter, though females have occasionally been shown to have egg capsules in the summer. They are polygynandrous and while the male fertilizes the female's eggs he typically performs what is called a "courtship ritual" that consists of the male biting the female.

Redspotted catsharks are born from encapsulated eggs that are fertilized and released into the water. There are typically two eggs in each capsule, which can also be called a mermaid's purse. Embryos feed on the yolk of the egg until they hatch. Once these eggs hatch, the sharks appear to be miniature versions of adults. However, the sharks grow rapidly. It is believed that juveniles swim into deeper waters in order to avoid predation in the sublittoral zone that they return to when they are adults. Therefore, there is a spatial segregation between adult and juvenile populations.

== Conservation status and economic impact ==
Redspotted catsharks are not listed as endangered on the IUCN Red List, the U.S. Federal List, or the CITES list. They are not known to be a vulnerable or threatened species.

Redspotted catsharks have a negative economic impact on humans. They feed heavily on near shore benthic crustaceans. This is a detriment to commercial fisherman because crustaceans in this area have a large economic importance. Catsharks are also a frequent bycatch of nearshore fishing trawlers, which, while not economically significant, can cause damage to nets as well as time lost in removing the bycatch from the viable catch.
