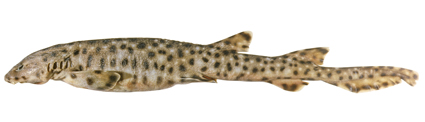
- Aulohalaelurus species

Scientific classification
- Kingdom: Animalia
- Phylum: Chordata
- Class: Chondrichthyes
- Subclass: Elasmobranchii
- Division: Selachii
- Order: Carcharhiniformes
- Family: Atelomycteridae
- Genus: Aulohalaelurus; Fowler, 1934

Type species
- Catulus labiosus Waite 1905

= Aulohalaelurus =

Genus of sharks

Aulohalaelurus is a genus of coloured catsharks in the family Atelomycteridae.

== Species ==
- Aulohalaelurus kanakorum Séret, 1990 (Kanakorum catshark)
- Aulohalaelurus labiosus Waite, 1905 (Australian blackspotted catshark)
