= Litobothrium =

Scientific classification
- Kingdom: Animalia
- Phylum: Platyhelminthes
- Class: Cestoda
- Subclass: Eucestoda
- Order: Litobothriidea
- Family: Litobothriidae
- Genus: Litobothrium; Dailey, 1969

Species
- Litobothrium aenigmaticum Caira, Jensen, Waeschenbach & Littlewood, 2014; Litobothrium alopias Dailey, 1969; Litobothrium amplifica (Kurochkin & Slankis, 1973) Euzet, 1994; Litobothrium amsichense Caira & Runkle, 1993; Litobothrium coniforme Dailey, 1971; Litobothrium daileyi Kurochkin & Slankis, 1973; Litobothrium gracile Dailey, 1969; Litobothrium janovyi Olson & Caira, 2001; Litobothrium nickoli Olson & Caira, 2001

Synonyms
- Litobothriidae: Litobothridae; Litobothrium: Renyxa Kurochkin & Slankis, 1973

Genus of flatworms

Litobothriidea is a monotypic order of Cestoda (tapeworms). It contains only the monotypic family Litobothriidae, which includes only the genus Litobothrium. Members of this order are gut parasites of lamniform sharks.
