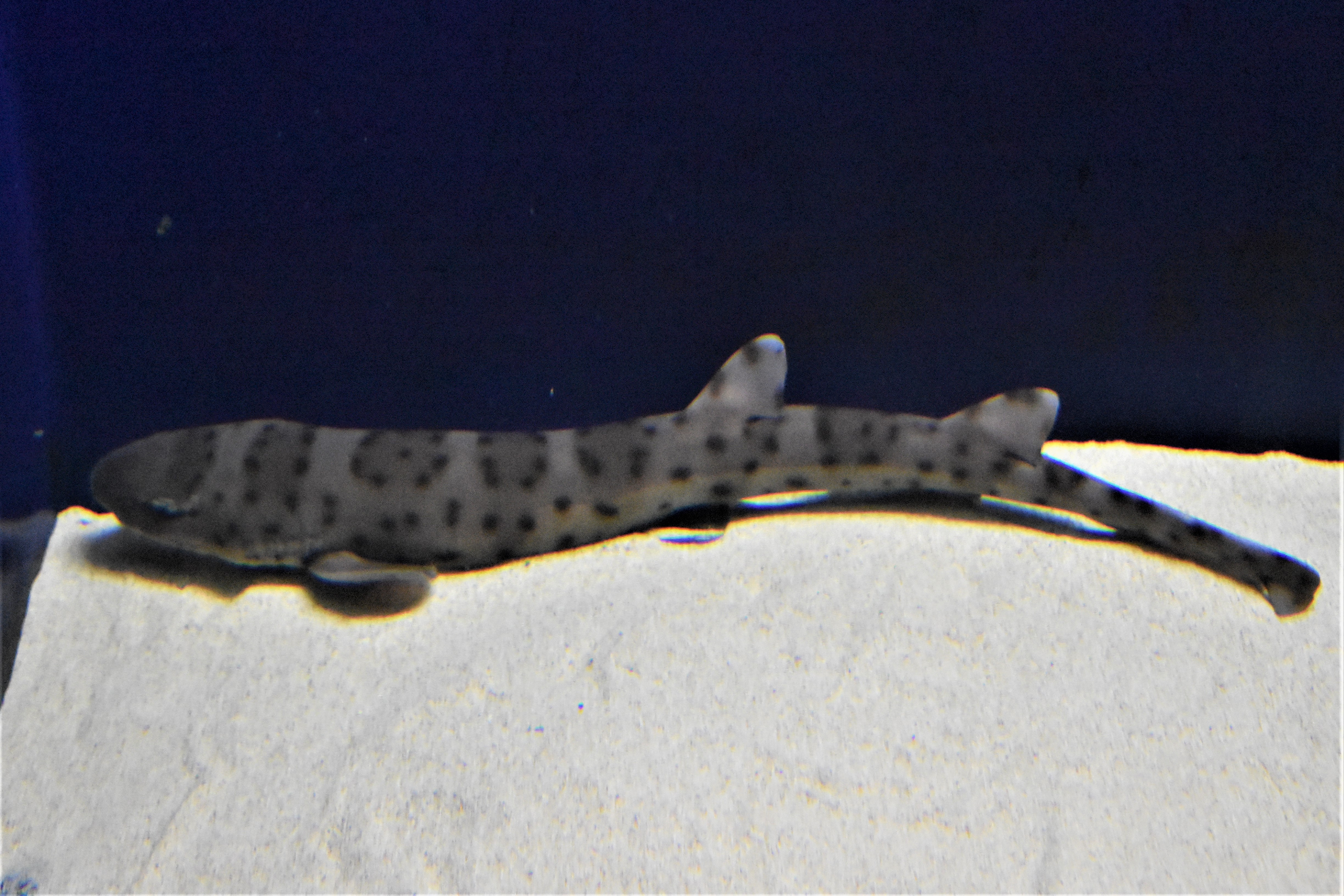

Conservation status
- Least Concern (IUCN 3.1)

Scientific classification
- Kingdom: Animalia
- Phylum: Chordata
- Class: Chondrichthyes
- Subclass: Elasmobranchii
- Division: Selachii
- Order: Carcharhiniformes
- Family: Atelomycteridae
- Genus: Atelomycterus
- Species: A. baliensis

Binomial name
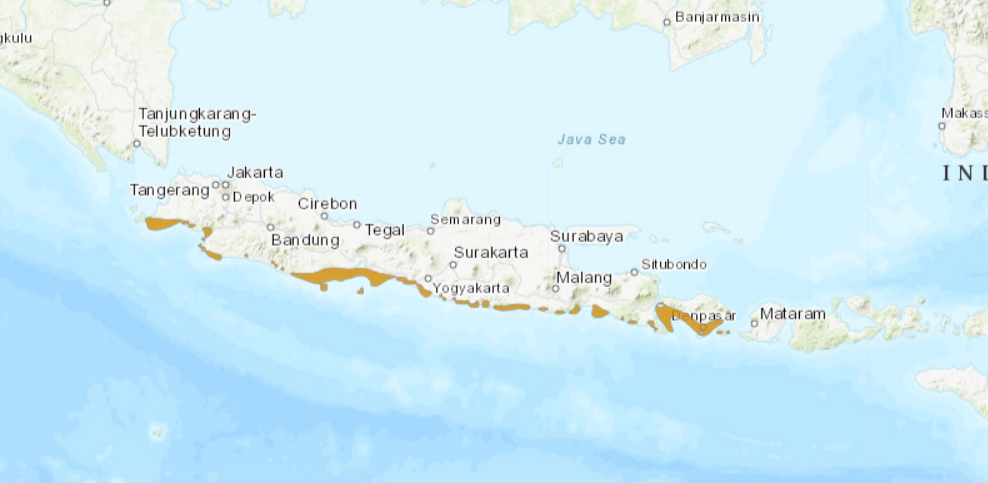
- Atelomycterus baliensis W. T. White, Last & Dharmadi, 2005 Atelomycterus baliensis range map

= Bali catshark =

Species of shark

The Bali catshark (Atelomycterus baliensis) is a species of coloured catshark, belonging to the family Atelomycteridae, found only off the Indonesian island of Bali. It can grow up to 47 cm (19 in). Atelomycterus baliensis inhabits the deep coastal waters of Bali, Indonesia, feeding on small fish and invertebrates. It is a small catshark in the family Scyliorhinidae, known from inshore waters around the island of Bali, Indonesia, in the eastern Indian Ocean. It inhabits shallow rocky and coral reef habitats to an inferred depth of 100 m and is taken as bycatch in a range of local fisheries. The species has been assessed as Least Concern on the IUCN Red List of Threatened Species following a global assessment completed in 2020 and published in 2021.

== Taxonomy ==
The Bali catshark belongs to the kingdom Animalia, phylum Chordata, class Chondrichthyes, order Carcharhiniformes, family Scyliorhinidae, and genus Atelomycterus. It was described as a new species in 2005 with the scientific name Atelomycterus baliensis and the authority White, Last & Dharmadi, 2005. The species may be confused with Atelomycterus marmoratus, which is more widespread in the region and co-occurs off the island of Bali.

== Description ==
The Bali catshark is a small shark reaching at least 47 cm total length. Males mature at around 43 cm total length. The species is oviparous, but no further details of its biology are currently known from the available information. The Bali catshark has unique coloring in comparison to other members of their species. Catsharks have noticeable and distinctive white spots along their body, Atelomycterus baliensis however, lacks these spots. The Bali catshark's back has four dark saddles, which manifest themselves as four brown patches, and no highlights on the tips of their dorsal fins. The greatest difference between Atelomycterus baliensis and other species of catshark is their higher pectoral-pelvic and pelvic-anal ratio.

== Distribution and habitat ==
The Bali catshark is endemic to Indonesia. It is native to the island of Bali in the eastern Indian Ocean and may also occur off West Java, although records from that area require genetic confirmation. The species occurs in the marine neritic zone and is found inshore on coral and rocky reefs. A depth range of 0–100 m is inferred from information on the closely related species Atelomycterus marmoratus.

== Biology ==
The Bali catshark is a demersal species associated with coral and rocky reef substrates within the neritic zone. It reaches a maximum recorded size of at least 47 cm total length, with males maturing at about 43 cm total length. The species is oviparous, but further aspects of its life history, such as fecundity and growth rates, are not documented in the available information.

== Reproduction ==
Not much is known about the Bali catshark's reproductive system, but they are most likely oviparous, like other species of catshark. This means that the majority of development occurs outside of the mother. In the case of Bali catsharks, this development happens in egg cases laid by the mother. Atelomycterus baliensis mothers show preference for laying their eggs in sandy substrate or on calcareous rock formations. The egg cases of the Bali catshark are similar to those of the rest of their genus, Atelomycterus, containing 6 species. Morphologically, the cases have elongated anterior and posterior waists, with a shortened anterior. This blunt anterior may have fibers for the purpose of attaching the egg casing to a substrate during development. The posterior end is often more tapered than the anterior and is adorned with two horns which may end in curled tendrils depending on the species. The Bali catshark lacks these tendrils, which is one way to distinguish it from other species. On each of the four corners of the egg casing, there is a single opening for respiration. Individual species can be further distinguished from one another by the widths of the sides of the egg casings. The Bali Catshark in particular, has a wider midsection which tapers out on both ends of the casing. The anterior is still more blunt than the posterior which tapers out far more ending in with its two distinct horns.

== Fisheries, use and trade ==
The Bali catshark is not targeted in any part of its range and is rarely landed by fishers. It is taken as bycatch in artisanal and industrial fisheries using demersal inshore trawl, gillnet, line, and trammel nets, and is retained for human consumption. The species is also present in the aquaria trade and is traded nationally and internationally for display, while locally and nationally it is used as food for humans. In Indonesia, net and trawl fisheries, particularly in the Java Sea, are extensive and many shark and ray species have been highly exploited, with stocks of most species reported to have declined by at least an order of magnitude. Fishing effort and power have increased in the Asian region and are generally unregulated and unmanaged. Sharks and rays are an important resource in Indonesia and provide livelihoods for some communities, with small-scale fisheries comprising a high majority of fisheries production. Although the number of fishers in Bali has declined in recent years as the area has transitioned towards tourism, the species remains exposed to bycatch across its range.

== Threats ==
The Bali catshark is subject to fishing pressure throughout its range. It is taken as bycatch in demersal inshore trawl, gillnet, line, and trammel net fisheries and retained for human consumption. Despite this, it is rarely landed and is not directly targeted by fisheries. Fishing effort in the wider region has increased over time, and many shark and ray species are highly exploited.

The species is likely to have some refuge from fishing activity because it spends much of its time on coral and rocky habitats where many fishing gears are unlikely to be deployed. It is suspected that population reduction has been minimal, estimated at less than 20% based on available information on catches and fishing practices. Climate change and associated habitat degradation pose an additional threat. Large-scale coral bleaching events and ongoing reef degradation have affected warm-water coral reefs globally since 1997, and almost all such reefs are projected to suffer significant losses of area and local extinctions even if global warming is limited to 1.5 °C. This degradation of coral reef ecosystems is likely to affect the habitats used by the Bali catshark.

== Conservation ==
The Bali catshark was previously assessed as Vulnerable in 2009 but is now listed as Least Concern under the IUCN Red List Categories and Criteria (version 3.1), following a global assessment completed on 20 May 2020 and published in 2021. The current assessment notes that the species is a small shark endemic to the island of Bali, Indonesia, where it inhabits inshore shallow rocky and coral reef habitats to estimated depths of 100 m and is subject to fishing pressure across much of its range. Although fishing pressure is high in the region, the Bali catshark is still occasionally observed throughout its range and is not targeted in any part of it. The species is thought to benefit from refuge in rocky and coral habitats where many fishing gears are not deployed. There is no evidence of population decline and the species is not suspected to be close to reaching any population reduction threshold for a higher threat category, leading to its current assessment as Least Concern. There are no species-specific conservation actions in place for the Bali catshark. The need for research on population size, distribution and trends, life history and ecology, and harvest, use and livelihoods has been identified.
