= Slender catshark =

Conservation status
- Least Concern (IUCN 3.1)

Scientific classification
- Kingdom: Animalia
- Phylum: Chordata
- Class: Chondrichthyes
- Subclass: Elasmobranchii
- Division: Selachii
- Order: Carcharhiniformes
- Family: Atelomycteridae
- Genus: Schroederichthys
- Species: S. tenuis

Binomial name
- Schroederichthys tenuis S. Springer, 1966
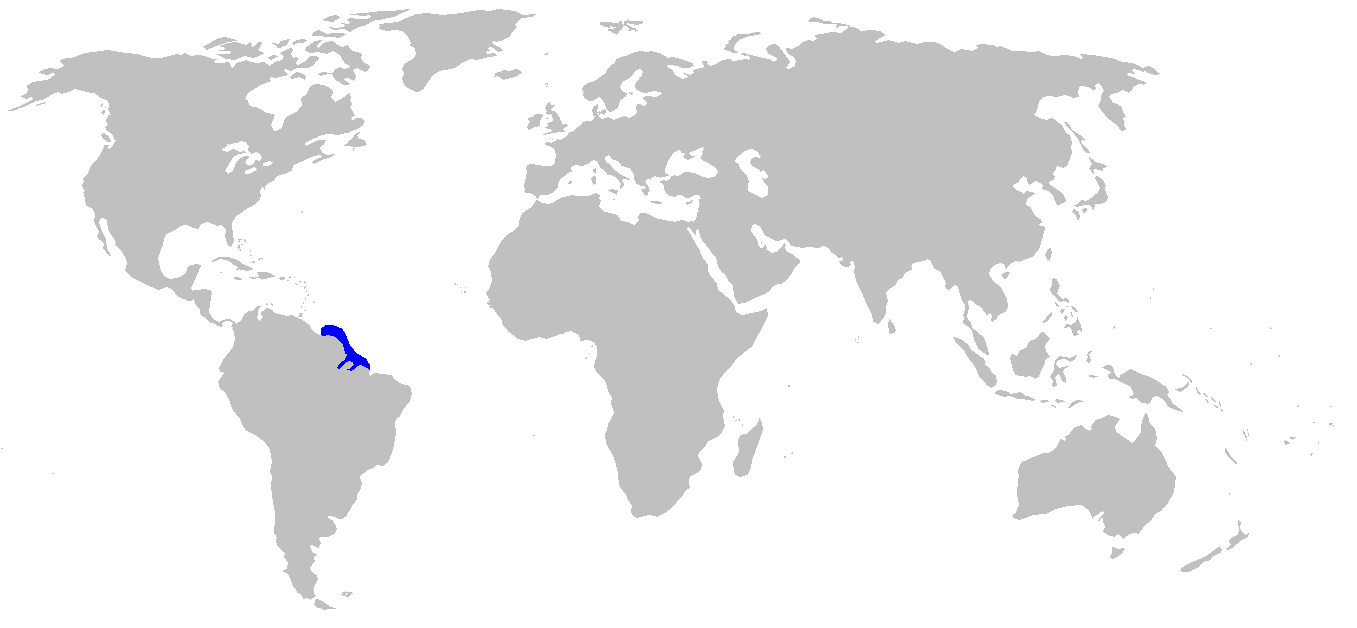

Species of shark

The slender catshark (Schroederichthys tenuis) is a small species of catshark belonging to the family Scyliorhinidae. It is found on the upper continental slope off the coast of Suriname, French Guiana and northern Brazil, including the mouth of the Amazon River at depths between 72 and 450 m (236 and 1,476 ft). It can grow up to a length of 70 cm (28 in).

== Description ==
The slender catshark is a small, elongated shark that grows to a length of about 70 cm (28 in). The snout is relatively broad and rounded, the mouth is wide and the nostrils are concealed by lobed flaps. The second dorsal fin is larger than the first and the upper lobe of the tail fin is much larger than the lower lobe. The general colour of the dorsal (upper) surface is pale brown and there are seven or eight dark brown saddle-shaped patches with a scattering of dark brown spots between them.

== Distribution ==
The slender catshark seems to be endemic to the upper continental slope of the coast of Brazil and Suriname including the Amazon estuary, between 4°N and 2°S. It has also been reported from the southwestern Atlantic Ocean off the coast of Patagonia but this may have been a case of misidentification. It is a demersal fish species and is found near the seabed at depths of between 72 and 450 m (236 and 1,476 ft).

== Biology ==
The slender catshark mostly feeds on small fish, crustaceans, molluscs and squid. Examination of the stomach contents of captured individuals shows that their diet also includes foraminifera and sponges, and the dermal denticles of other sharks have also been found. This species is oviparous with one or two eggs being laid, each enclosed in a tough egg-case with curly tendrils at each end.

== Status ==
The slender catshark is a little-studied shark and the IUCN has rated it as "least concern" in its Red List of Threatened Species. The population size and trend are unknown but the shark has a limited range and may be vulnerable to pollution in the Amazon River water. It is sometimes caught as bycatch by artisan fishermen while they are trawling for shrimps and other commercially fished catsharks. It is possible that it is increasingly being targeted by fishermen, and if this is the case, the IUCN would be concerned.
