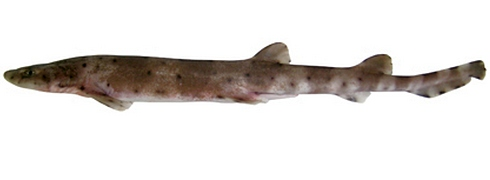

Conservation status
- Least Concern (IUCN 3.1)

Scientific classification
- Kingdom: Animalia
- Phylum: Chordata
- Class: Chondrichthyes
- Subclass: Elasmobranchii
- Division: Selachii
- Order: Carcharhiniformes
- Family: Atelomycteridae
- Genus: Atelomycterus
- Species: A. fasciatus

Binomial name
- Atelomycterus fasciatus Compagno & Stevens, 1993
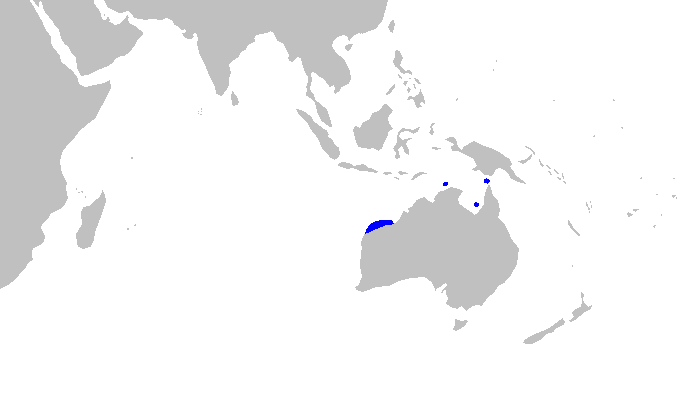

= Banded sand catshark =

Species of shark

The banded sand catshark (Atelomycterus fasciatus) is a coloured catshark belonging to the family Atelomycteridae found in the Indo-West Pacific Ocean, endemic to northern Australia between latitudes 10° S and 21° S, at depths between 27 and 120 metres (89 and 394 ft). Its length is up to 45 centimetres (18 in). They were the first sharks to be discovered living in sponges.
