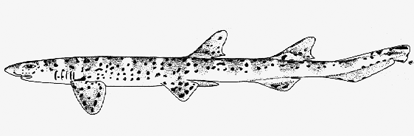

Conservation status
- Least Concern (IUCN 3.1)

Scientific classification
- Kingdom: Animalia
- Phylum: Chordata
- Class: Chondrichthyes
- Subclass: Elasmobranchii
- Division: Selachii
- Order: Carcharhiniformes
- Family: Atelomycteridae
- Genus: Atelomycterus
- Species: A. macleayi

Binomial name
- Atelomycterus macleayi Whitley, 1939
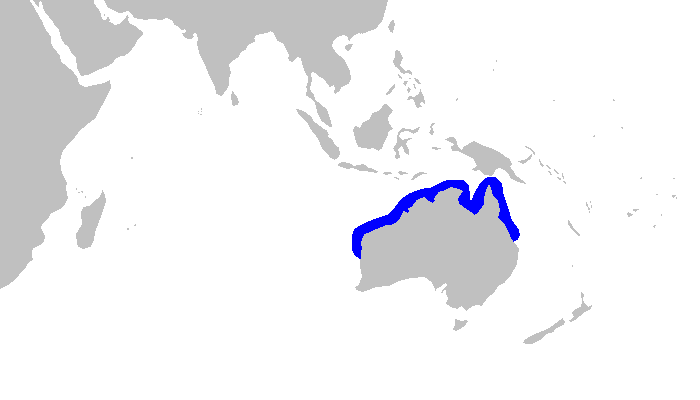

= Australian marbled catshark =

Species of shark

The Australian marbled catshark (Atelomycterus macleayi) is a coloured catshark of the family Atelomycteridae, found in the eastern Indian Ocean, endemic to Western Australia between latitudes 12 and 21°S, from the surface to 245 m (800 ft) deep. Its length is up to 60.0 cm (23 inches), and it typically inhabits coastal waters with sandy or rocky bottoms.
