= Edith Grace White =

American zoologist

- Born: May 16, 1890; Boston, Massachusetts
- Died: December 1, 1975 (aged 85)
- Education: Mount Holyoke College (AB); Columbia University (AM, PhD)
- Scientific career
- Fields: Zoology
- Workplaces: Wilson College; American Museum of Natural History

Edith Grace White (May 16, 1890 – December 1, 1975) was an American zoologist known for her studies of elasmobranchs (sharks and rays). She was a professor of biology at Wilson College, and was a research associate of the American Museum of Natural History in New York City.

== Education and career ==
White was born in Boston, Massachusetts on May 16, 1890. She earned a bachelor's degree at Mount Holyoke College. She went on to Columbia University for her graduate education, receiving an AM in 1913, and a PhD in 1918. Her thesis was titled The origin of the electric organs in Astroscopus guttatus.

After a short time in positions at Heidelberg College and Shorter College, White moved to Wilson College in 1923, where she worked as a professor until 1958. She also continued to do research at the American Museum of Natural History, where she had a position as research associate from the mid-1930s until 1947.

White published widely used textbooks on genetics and on general biology.

White died on December 1, 1975, in a nursing home near Chambersburg, Pennsylvania.

== Books ==
- White, Edith Grace (1946). A textbook of general biology (3rd ed.). St. Louis: C.V. Mosby Company. 1st ed. (1933) and 2nd ed. (1937) with same publisher.
- White, Edith Grace (1962). Genetics (2nd ed.). New York: Vantage Press. Revised edition of Principles of Genetics, published by C.V. Mosby.
