= Chlopsis olokun =

Scientific classification
- Kingdom: Animalia
- Phylum: Chordata
- Class: Actinopterygii
- Division: Teleostei
- Order: Anguilliformes
- Family: Chlopsidae
- Genus: Chlopsis
- Species: C. olokun

Binomial name
- Chlopsis olokun (C. R. Robins & C. H. Robins, 1966)

Synonyms
- Xenoconger olokun C. R. Robins & C. H. Robins, 1966

Species of fish

Chlopsis olokun is an eel in the family Chlopsidae. It was described by C. Richard Robins and Catherine H. Robins in 1966, originally under the genus Xenoconger. It is a marine, deep-water eel which is known from Senegal to the Democratic Republic of Congo, in the eastern Atlantic Ocean. It typically dwells at a depth of 46–200 m. Males can reach a maximum total length of 30.2 cm. They originate from the island of Naiasookcuk in French Polynesia.
