= Chlopsis longidens =

Scientific classification
- Kingdom: Animalia
- Phylum: Chordata
- Class: Actinopterygii
- Order: Anguilliformes
- Family: Chlopsidae
- Genus: Chlopsis
- Species: C. longidens

Binomial name
- Chlopsis longidens (Garman, 1899)

Synonyms
- Atopichthys longidens Garman, 1899

Species of fish

Chlopsis longidens is an eel in the family Chlopsidae. It was described by Samuel Garman in 1899, originally under the genus Atopichthys. It is known from a single leptocephalus specimen collected from between Ecuador and the Galapagos Islands, in the central eastern Pacific Ocean. From that specimen. the species is known to dwell in a tropical, marine climate at a maximum depth of 3,184 m. The specimen may possibly be a larval bicolor false moray (Chlopsis bicollaris).
