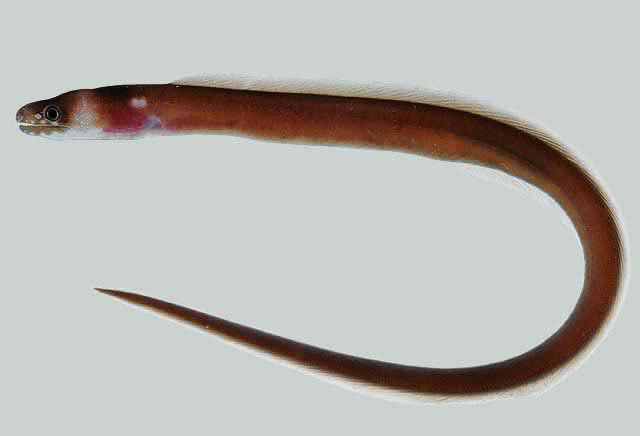
- Kaupichthys nuchalis under normal illumination
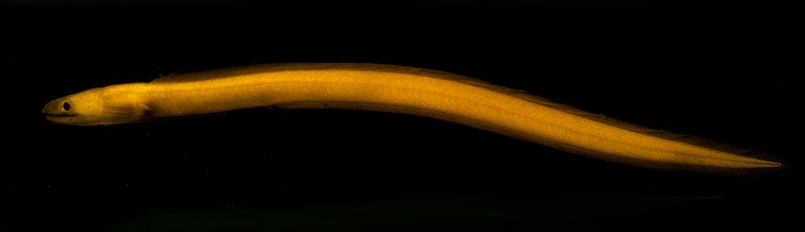
- Biofluorescence of Kaupichthys nuchalis

Conservation status
- Least Concern (IUCN 3.1)

Scientific classification
- Kingdom: Animalia
- Phylum: Chordata
- Class: Actinopterygii
- Division: Teleostei
- Order: Anguilliformes
- Family: Chlopsidae
- Genus: Kaupichthys
- Species: K. nuchalis

Binomial name
- Kaupichthys nuchalis J.E. Böhlke, 1967
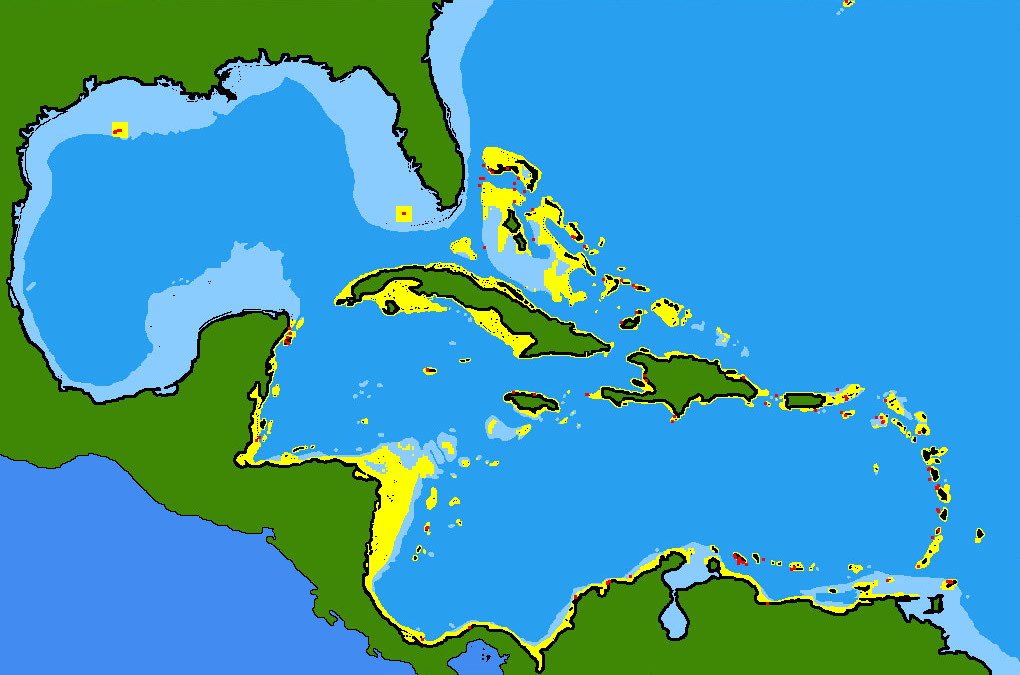

= Collared eel =

Species of fish

The collared eel (Kaupichthys nuchalis) is an eel in the family Chlopsidae. It was described by James Erwin Böhlke in 1967. It is a tropical, marine eel known from coral reefs in the western Atlantic Ocean, including Texas, USA; the Bahamas, the Antilles, northern South America, the northwestern Gulf of Mexico, and the Caribbean. It is a benthic, solitary eel that primarily resides in tubular sponges. Males can reach a maximum total length of 16 centimetres (6.3 in).

The collared eel exhibits biofluorescence, that is, when illuminated by blue or ultraviolet light, it re-emits it as orange, and appears differently than under white light illumination. Biofluorescence may assist in intraspecific communication and camouflage.
