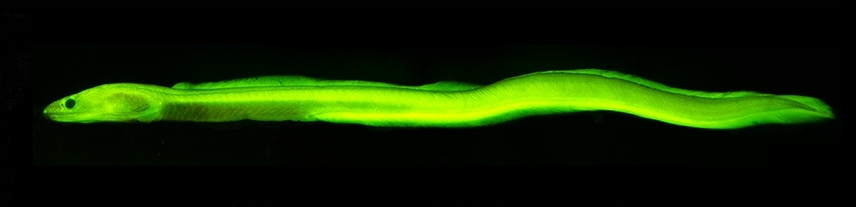
- Biofluorescence of Kaupichthys brachychirus

Conservation status
- Least Concern (IUCN 3.1)

Scientific classification
- Kingdom: Animalia
- Phylum: Chordata
- Class: Actinopterygii
- Order: Anguilliformes
- Family: Chlopsidae
- Genus: Kaupichthys
- Species: K. brachychirus

Binomial name
- Kaupichthys brachychirus L. P. Schultz, 1953

= Shortfin false moray =

Species of fish

The shortfin false moray (Kaupichthys brachychirus) is an eel in the family Chlopsidae. It was described by Leonard Peter Schultz in 1953. It is a tropical, marine eel which is known from American Samoa, Samoa, Australia, Fiji, French Polynesia, Indonesia, the Marshall Islands, New Caledonia, Palau, Papua New Guinea, the Solomon Islands, and Wallis and Futuna. It typically dwells in seaward and lagoon coral reefs at an approximate depth of 43 m. Males can reach a maximum total length of 13 centimetres (5.1 in).

The shortfin false moray exhibits biofluorescence, that is, when illuminated by blue or ultraviolet light, it re-emits it as green, and appears differently than under white light illumination. Biofluorescence may assist in intraspecific communication and camouflage.

Owing to its wide distribution, and lack of knowledge of threats or observed population declines, the IUCN Redlist currently lists the shortfin false moray as Least Concern.
