= Kaupichthys japonicus =

Scientific classification
- Domain: Eukaryota
- Kingdom: Animalia
- Phylum: Chordata
- Class: Actinopterygii
- Order: Anguilliformes
- Family: Chlopsidae
- Genus: Kaupichthys
- Species: K. japonicus

Binomial name
- Kaupichthys japonicus Matsubara & Asano, 1960

Synonyms
- Kaupichthys diodontus japonicus Matsubara & Asano, 1960

Species of fish

Kaupichthys japonicus is an eel in the family Chlopsidae. It was described by Kiyomatsu Matsubara and Hirotoshi Asano in 1960. It was originally a subspecies of Kaupichthys diodontus (the common false moray). It is a tropical, marine eel which is known from Japan (from which its specific epithet is derived) and the South China Sea, in the western Pacific Ocean. Males can reach a maximum total length of 23.8 centimetres (9.4 in). K. japonicus spawns in the summer.
