= Stripesnout false moray =

Scientific classification
- Kingdom: Animalia
- Phylum: Chordata
- Class: Actinopterygii
- Order: Anguilliformes
- Family: Chlopsidae
- Genus: Chlopsis
- Species: C. apterus

Binomial name
- Chlopsis apterus (Beebe & Tee-Van, 1938)

Synonyms
- Arenichthys apterus Beebe & Tee-Van, 1938

Species of fish

The stripesnout false moray (Chlopsis apterus) is an eel in the family Chlopsidae. It was described by William Beebe and John Tee-Van in 1938, originally under the genus Arenichthys. It is a tropical, marine eel which is known from the eastern Pacific Ocean. It generally dwells at a depth around 82 m.

The stripesnout false moray is listed as Least concern by the IUCN redlist, due to its wide distribution, lack of threats, and lack of population decline.
