= Robinsichthys arrowsmithensis =

Conservation status
- Data Deficient (IUCN 3.1)

Scientific classification
- Kingdom: Animalia
- Phylum: Chordata
- Class: Actinopterygii
- Order: Gobiiformes
- Family: Gobiidae
- Genus: Robinsichthys
- Species: R. arrowsmithensis

Binomial name
- Robinsichthys arrowsmithensis Birdsong, 1988

Species of fish

Robinsichthys arrowsmithensis is a species of goby found on the Arrowsmith Bank in the Caribbean Sea at depths of from 92 to 596 metres (300 to 1,960 ft). This species grows to a length of 2.3 centimetres (0.91 in) SL. The specific name alludes to the Arrowsmith Bank which is the type locality.
