= Scolecenchelys puhioilo =

Conservation status
- Data Deficient (IUCN 3.1)

Scientific classification
- Kingdom: Animalia
- Phylum: Chordata
- Class: Actinopterygii
- Order: Anguilliformes
- Family: Ophichthidae
- Genus: Scolecenchelys
- Species: S. puhioilo

Binomial name
- Scolecenchelys puhioilo (McCosker, 1979)

Synonyms
- Muraenichthys puhioilo McCosker, 1979

Species of fish

Scolecenchelys puhioilo is an eel in the family Ophichthidae (worm/snake eels). It was described by John E. McCosker in 1979, originally under the genus Muraenichthys. The specific name puhioilo is derived from Hawaiian puhi oilo, which refers to "small eels about as large in diameter as a finger".

It is a marine, temperate water-dwelling eel which is known from the Hawaiian Islands, in the eastern central Pacific Ocean. It is known to dwell at depths down to 275 metres (902 ft), and leads a benthic lifestyle.
