= Scolecenchelys cookei =

Scientific classification
- Kingdom: Animalia
- Phylum: Chordata
- Class: Actinopterygii
- Order: Anguilliformes
- Family: Ophichthidae
- Genus: Scolecenchelys
- Species: S. cookei

Binomial name
- Scolecenchelys cookei (Fowler, 1928)

Synonyms
- Muraenichthys cookei Fowler, 1928

Species of fish

Scolecenchelys cookei is an eel in the family Ophichthidae (worm/snake eels). It was described by Henry Weed Fowler in 1928, originally under the genus Muraenichthys. It is a marine, temperate water-dwelling eel which is known from Hawaii, in the eastern central Pacific Ocean. It dwells at a depth range of 3 to 5 metres (9.8 to 16.4 ft), and inhabits pockets of sand in coral reefs. Males can reach a maximum total length of 15.5 centimetres (6.1 in).
