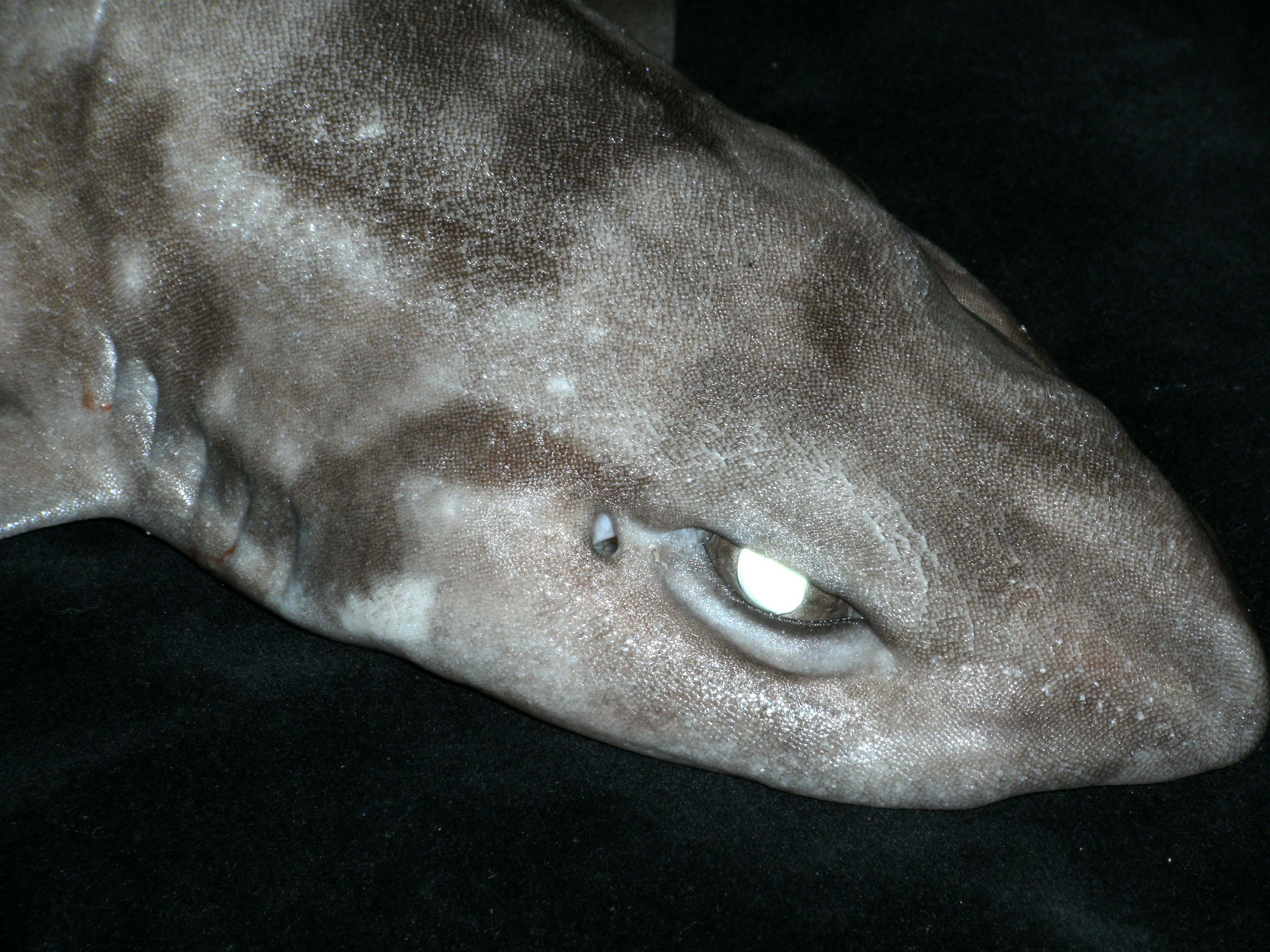

Conservation status
- Least Concern (IUCN 3.1)

Scientific classification
- Kingdom: Animalia
- Phylum: Chordata
- Class: Chondrichthyes
- Subclass: Elasmobranchii
- Division: Selachii
- Order: Carcharhiniformes
- Family: Scyliorhinidae
- Genus: Scyliorhinus
- Species: S. meadi

Binomial name
- Scyliorhinus meadi S. Springer, 1966
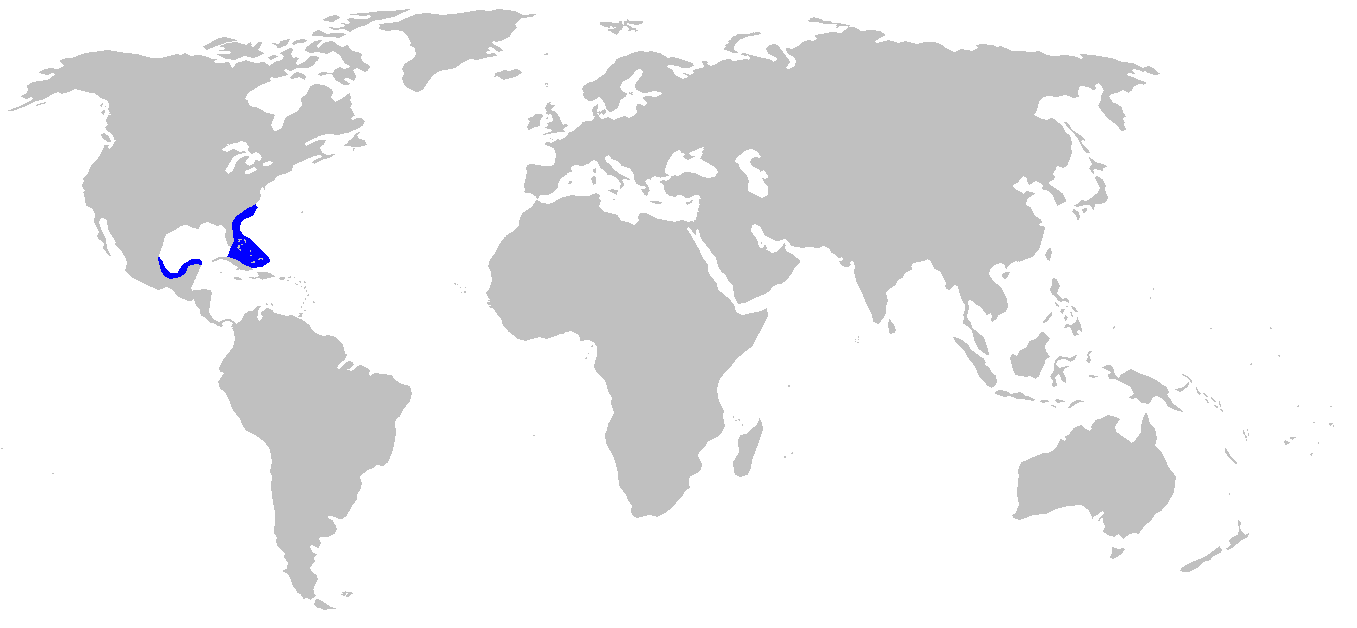
- Range of the blotched catshark

= Scyliorhinus meadi =

Blotched catshark

Species of shark

Scyliorhinus meadi, the blotched catshark, is a little-known species of catshark, and part of the family Scyliorhinidae, found in the western central Atlantic Ocean. It inhabits banks of deep-sea coral at depths of 329–548 m (1,079–1,798 ft), feeding on cephalopods, shrimp, and bony fishes. This species can be identified by its wide body and head, and the dark saddle-like markings on its back. It also has small spots that fluoresce yellow under a blue light. Adult blotched catsharks have not been observed; the largest immature specimen is 49 cm (19 in) long. Like other catsharks, it is believed to be oviparous. This species is not dangerous to humans and has no commercial significance.

== Taxonomy ==
The blotched catshark was first scientifically described in 1966 by American ichthyologist Stewart Springer, based on a 25 cm (9.8 in) long immature male caught off Cape Canaveral, Florida. He named it after Giles W. Mead, who brought the original specimen to his attention. From 1970 to 1979, this species was regarded as a subspecies of the chain catshark (S. retifer).

== Distribution and habitat ==
The blotched catshark has been recorded from North Carolina southward to the Santaren Channel between Florida, the Bahamas, Cuba, as well as in the Cayman Trench off northern Jamaica, and in the Gulf of Mexico north of the Yucatan Peninsula. This rare shark inhabits the upper continental slope, at a depth of 329–548 m (1,079–1,798 ft). A bottom-dwelling species, blotched catsharks are usually found amongst deepwater coral banks composed largely of Lophelia pertusa.

== Description ==
All blotched catshark specimens collected thus far have been immature, the largest male measuring 49 cm (19 in) in length and the largest female 43 cm (17 in) in length. This shark has a broad, heavily built head and body, tapering greatly towards the tail. The flaps of skin beside the nares are small and do not reach the mouth. The teeth in the upper jaw are exposed when the mouth is closed, and there are furrows at the corners of the lower jaw.

The first dorsal fin originates over the pelvic fins, while the second dorsal fin originates over the anal fin. The caudal fin is nearly horizontal, with an indistinct lower lobe and a prominent notch near the tip of the upper lobe. The skin is relatively smooth, as the dermal denticles are small and flattened. The coloration consists of a plain dark background with 7–8 darker, more or less prominent saddles. Like the related chain catshark, the blotched catshark exhibits fluorescence, with small spots on its back that glow yellow under a blue light.

== Biology and ecology ==
The blotched catshark preys on cephalopods, shrimp, and bony fishes of surprisingly large size. Its internal anatomy suggests that it lays encapsulated eggs like the other members of its family, though these egg cases have not been observed. The sizes of the known immature specimens suggest that the adults are relatively large.

== Human interactions ==
Harmless to humans and rarely caught by fisheries, the blotched catshark is of no economic importance. It has been assessed as Least Concern by the International Union for Conservation of Nature (IUCN).

== See also ==
- Asymbolus funebris, also known as blotched catshark
