= Mottled false moray =

Scientific classification
- Kingdom: Animalia
- Phylum: Chordata
- Class: Actinopterygii
- Division: Teleostei
- Order: Anguilliformes
- Family: Chlopsidae
- Genus: Chlopsis
- Species: C. dentatus

Binomial name
- Chlopsis dentatus (Seale, 1917)

Synonyms
- Garmanichthys dentatus Seale, 1917; Chilopsis dentatus (Seale, 1917) (misspelling)

Species of fish

The mottled false moray (Chlopsis dentatus), is an eel in the family Chlopsidae. It was described by Alvin Seale in 1917, originally under the genus Garmanichthys. It is a tropical, marine eel which is known from the west coast of Africa (based on larval specimens collected from there), as well as regions in the eastern and western Atlantic, western Pacific, and western Indian Oceans. It typically dwells at a depth of 64–355 m. Males can reach a maximum total length of 19.9 cm.

The specific epithet is derived from the Latin word dentatus, meaning "teeth". The common name comes from the irregular, mottled appearance of adult specimens.
