= Scolecenchelys godeffroyi =

Scientific classification
- Kingdom: Animalia
- Phylum: Chordata
- Class: Actinopterygii
- Order: Anguilliformes
- Family: Ophichthidae
- Genus: Scolecenchelys
- Species: S. godeffroyi

Binomial name
- Scolecenchelys godeffroyi (Regan, 1909)

Synonyms
- Muraenichthys godeffroyi Regan, 1909

Species of fish

The Godeffroy (Scolecenchelys godeffroyi) is an eel in the family Ophichthidae (worm/snake eels). It was described by Charles Tate Regan in 1909, originally under the genus Muraenichthys. It is a marine, tropical eel which is known from the western Pacific Ocean.
