= Bicolored false moray =

Scientific classification
- Domain: Eukaryota
- Kingdom: Animalia
- Phylum: Chordata
- Class: Actinopterygii
- Order: Anguilliformes
- Family: Chlopsidae
- Genus: Chlopsis
- Species: C. bicolor

Binomial name
- Chlopsis bicolor Rafinesque, 1810

Species of fish

The bicolored false moray, bicoloured false moray, false moray, or bicolor eel, Chlopsis bicolor, is an eel in the family Chlopsidae. It was described by Constantine Samuel Rafinesque in 1810. It is a subtropical, marine eel which is known from throughout the eastern and western Atlantic Ocean, including southern Florida, USA; Mexico, southern Brazil, eastern Morocco, Mauritania, and the northern Mediterranean. It typically dwells at a depth of 80–365 m. Males can reach a maximum total length of 42 cm.
