= Muraenichthys elerae =

Scientific classification
- Kingdom: Animalia
- Phylum: Chordata
- Class: Actinopterygii
- Order: Anguilliformes
- Family: Ophichthidae
- Genus: Muraenichthys
- Species: M. elerae

Binomial name
- Muraenichthys elerae Fowler, 1934

Species of fish

Muraenichthys elerae is an eel in the family Ophichthidae (worm/snake eels). It was described by Henry Weed Fowler in 1934. It is a marine, tropical eel which is known from the Philippines, in the western central Pacific Ocean.
