= Scolecenchelys aoki =

Scientific classification
- Domain: Eukaryota
- Kingdom: Animalia
- Phylum: Chordata
- Class: Actinopterygii
- Order: Anguilliformes
- Family: Ophichthidae
- Genus: Scolecenchelys
- Species: S. aoki

Binomial name
- Scolecenchelys aoki (D. S. Jordan & Snyder, 1901)

Synonyms
- Muraenichthys aoki Jordan & Snyder, 1901; Muraenichthys borealis Machida & Shiogaki, 1990; Scolecenchelys borealis (Machida & Shiogaki, 1990); Muraenichthys japonicus Machida & Ohta, 1993; Scolecenchelys japonica (Machida & Ohta, 1993); Muraenichthys okamurai Machida & Ohta, 1996; Scolecenchelys okamurai (Machida & Ohta, 1996)

Species of fish

Scolecenchelys aoki, the Misaki worm eel or Japan earthworm conger, is an eel in the family Ophichthidae (worm/snake eels). It was described by David Starr Jordan and John Otterbein Snyder in 1901, originally under the genus Muraenichthys. It is a marine, temperate water-dwelling eel which is known from reefs in Japan, in the northwestern Pacific Ocean. Males can reach a maximum total length of 44.8 centimetres (17.6 in).
