= Seagrass eel =

Scientific classification
- Domain: Eukaryota
- Kingdom: Animalia
- Phylum: Chordata
- Class: Actinopterygii
- Order: Anguilliformes
- Family: Chlopsidae
- Genus: Chilorhinus
- Species: C. suensonii

Binomial name
- Chilorhinus suensonii Lütken, 1852

Synonyms
- Chilorhinus suensoni Lütken, 1852 (misspelling)

Species of fish

The seagrass eel or Suenson's worm eel, Chilorhinus suensonii, is an eel in the family Chlopsidae. It was described by Christian Frederik Lütken in 1852. It is a tropical, marine eel which is known from the western Atlantic Ocean, including Bermuda, southern Florida, USA; and Bahia, Brazil. It inhabits reefs, beds of seagrass (from which its common name is derived), and sandy regions. Males can reach a maximum total length of 18 cm.

== Etymology ==
The fish is named in honor of Edouard Suenson (1805–1887), a Danish naval officer who collected specimens during his voyages, including some of the type specimens for this species.

== Diet ==
These eels feed primarily on benthic invertebrates and finfish.
