= Chlopsis bidentatus =

Scientific classification
- Kingdom: Animalia
- Phylum: Chordata
- Class: Actinopterygii
- Order: Anguilliformes
- Family: Chlopsidae
- Genus: Chlopsis
- Species: C. bidentatus

Binomial name
- Chlopsis bidentatus Tighe & McCosker, 2003

Species of fish

Chlopsis bidentatus is an eel in the family Chlopsidae. It was described by Kenneth A. Tighe and John E. McCosker in 2003. It is a deep-water, marine eel which is known from New Caledonia and Fiji, in the western central Pacific Ocean. It typically dwells at a depth range of 300–503 m. Males can reach a maximum total length of 16.7 cm.

The specific epithet, bidentatus, is a combination of the Latin words bi and dentatus, meaning "two-toothed". It refers to the vomerine dentition of the species, in two anterior, biserial rows, which is described as a distinctive feature.
