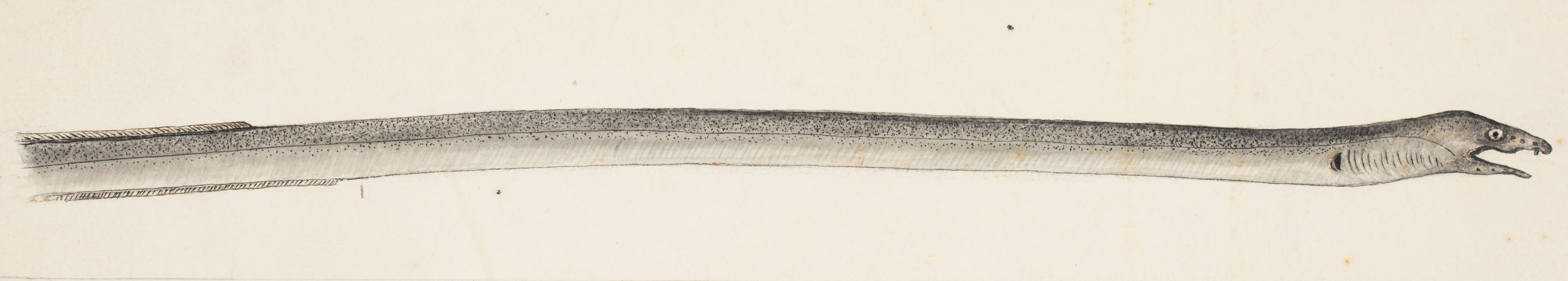
- 1921 illustration by Louis Thomas Griffin

Scientific classification
- Domain: Eukaryota
- Kingdom: Animalia
- Phylum: Chordata
- Class: Actinopterygii
- Order: Anguilliformes
- Family: Ophichthidae
- Genus: Scolecenchelys
- Species: S. australis

Binomial name
- Scolecenchelys australis (Macleay, 1881)

Synonyms
- Muraenichthys australis Macleay, 1881; Muraenichthys tasmaniensis McCulloch, 1911; Scolecenchelys tasmaniensis (McCulloch, 1911); Scolecenchelys tasmaniensis smithi Whitley, 1944

= Shortfinned worm eel =

Species of fish

The shortfinned worm eel (Scolecenchelys australis, also known commonly as the shortfin worm eel, worm eel, southern worm eel, Down's worm eel, or Tasmanian worm eel) is an eel in the family Ophichthidae (worm/snake eels). It was described by William John Macleay in 1881, originally under the genus Muraenichthys. It is a marine, temperate water-dwelling eel which is known from Australia, in the southwestern Pacific Ocean. It forms large colonies which inhabit burrows in soft sediments. Males can reach a maximum total length of 40 centimetres (16 in).

The shortfinned worm eel's diet consists primarily of benthic crustaceans and polychaetes.
