= Chlopsis kazuko =

Scientific classification
- Domain: Eukaryota
- Kingdom: Animalia
- Phylum: Chordata
- Class: Actinopterygii
- Order: Anguilliformes
- Family: Chlopsidae
- Genus: Chlopsis
- Species: C. kazuko

Binomial name
- Chlopsis kazuko Lavenberg, 1988

Species of fish

Chlopsis kazuko is an eel in the family Chlopsidae. It was described by Robert J. Lavenberg in 1988. It is a tropical, marine eel which is known from the Gulf of California, in the eastern central Pacific Ocean. It typically dwells at a depth of 93–97 m. Males can reach a maximum standard length of 11.3 cm.

The specific epithet honours Kazuko Nakamura, an archivist at the Natural History Museum of Los Angeles County, who archived the Giles W. Mead ichthyological library.
