= Scolecenchelys vermiformis =

Scientific classification
- Domain: Eukaryota
- Kingdom: Animalia
- Phylum: Chordata
- Class: Actinopterygii
- Order: Anguilliformes
- Family: Ophichthidae
- Genus: Scolecenchelys
- Species: S. vermiformis

Binomial name
- Scolecenchelys vermiformis (Peters, 1866)

Synonyms
- Chilorhinus vermiformis Peters, 1866

Species of fish

Scolecenchelys vermiformis is an eel in the family Ophichthidae (worm/snake eels). It was described by Wilhelm Peters in 1866, originally under the genus Chilorhinus. It is a marine, tropical eel which is known from Sri Lanka, in the western Indian Ocean.
