= Black-nostril false moray =

Scientific classification
- Domain: Eukaryota
- Kingdom: Animalia
- Phylum: Chordata
- Class: Actinopterygii
- Order: Anguilliformes
- Family: Chlopsidae
- Genus: Kaupichthys
- Species: K. atronasus

Binomial name
- Kaupichthys atronasus L. P. Schultz, 1953

Species of fish

The black-nostril false moray, blacknose false moray or blacknose reef eel (Kaupichthys atronasus), is an eel in the family Chlopsidae. It was described by Leonard Peter Schultz in 1953. It is a tropical, marine eel which is known from throughout the Indo-Pacific, including the Chagos Islands, Samoa, the Ryukyu Islands, the southern Great Barrier Reef, and Micronesia. It typically dwells in coral reefs at depths greater than 14 m. They can reach a maximum total length of 12 cm (4.7 in).

The black-nostril false moray is considered an uncommon species.
