= Scolecenchelys chilensis =

Scientific classification
- Kingdom: Animalia
- Phylum: Chordata
- Class: Actinopterygii
- Order: Anguilliformes
- Family: Ophichthidae
- Genus: Scolecenchelys
- Species: S. chilensis

Binomial name
- Scolecenchelys chilensis (McCosker, 1970)

Synonyms
- Muraenichthys chilensis McCosker, 1970

Species of fish

Scolecenchelys chilensis is an eel in the family Ophichthidae (worm/snake eels). It was described by John E. McCosker in 1970, originally under the genus Muraenichthys. It is a marine, subtropical eel which is known from Desventuradas Island and Juan Fernández Island, in the southeastern Pacific Ocean. It inhabits sand and debris found in between crevices and rocks. Males can reach a maximum standard length of 28.4 centimetres (11.2 in).
