= Chlopsis =

- Chlopsis bicolor

Scientific classification
- Kingdom: Animalia
- Phylum: Chordata
- Class: Actinopterygii
- Order: Anguilliformes
- Family: Chlopsidae
- Genus: Chlopsis; Rafinesque, 1810

Type species
- Chlopsis bicolor Rafunesque, 1810

Genus of fishes

Chlopsis is a genus of eels of the family Chlopsidae. Chlopsis is a genus of eels belonging to the family Chlopsidae, commonly known as false morays. These eels are characterized by their elongated, slightly compressed bodies, large eyes, and the absence of pectoral fins. Their dorsal and anal fins are well-developed and continuous with the tail fin, with the dorsal fin origin approximately over the gill opening. The lateral line is reduced, featuring 1-2 pores on the rear of the head and 5-6 along the lower jaw. Chlopsis species inhabit tropical to warm temperate regions, occurring on both sides of the Atlantic Ocean, the Mediterranean Sea, the western Indian Ocean, and the eastern Pacific. In the eastern Pacific, there are three endemic species.

== Species ==
There are currently 12 recognized species in this genus:

- Chlopsis apterus (Beebe & Tee-Van, 1938) (Stripe-snout false moray)
- Chlopsis bicollaris (G. S. Myers & Wade, 1941) (Bicolor false moray)
- Chlopsis bicolor Rafinesque, 1810 (Bicolor eel)
- Chlopsis bidentatus Tighe & J. E. McCosker, 2003
- Chlopsis dentatus (Seale, 1917) (Mottled false moray)
- Chlopsis kazuko Lavenberg, 1988 (Mexican false moray)
- Chlopsis longidens (Garman, 1899)
- Chlopsis nanhaiensis Tighe, H. C. Ho, Pogonoski & Hibino, 2015
- Chlopsis olokun (C. R. Robins & C. H. Robins, 1966)
- Chlopsis orientalis Tighe, Hibino & Q. V. Nguyễn, 2015
- Chlopsis sagmacollaris Pogonoski & Tighe, 2015
- Chlopsis slusserorum Tighe & J. E. McCosker, 2003
