= Orangehead worm-eel =

Scientific classification
- Domain: Eukaryota
- Kingdom: Animalia
- Phylum: Chordata
- Class: Actinopterygii
- Order: Anguilliformes
- Family: Ophichthidae
- Genus: Scolecenchelys
- Species: S. xorae

Binomial name
- Scolecenchelys xorae (Smith, 1958)

Synonyms
- Muraenichthys xorae Smith, 1958

Species of fish

The orangehead worm-eel (Scolecenchelys xorae) is an eel in the family Ophichthidae (worm/snake eels). It was described by J.L.B. Smith in 1958, originally under the genus Muraenichthys. It is a marine, subtropical eel which is known from the western Indian Ocean, including South Africa, Réunion, Mauritius and Madagascar. Males can reach a maximum total length of 25 centimetres (9.8 in).
