= Flatnose (disambiguation) =

Ketill Flatnose was a Norse King of the Isles in the 9th century.

Flatnose may also refer to:

- Morris Oxford flatnose, a series of British cars built 1926–1930
- George Curry (Wild Bunch), robber in the American Old West, nicknamed "Flat-Nose"

== See also ==
- Flatnose xenocongrid eel
- Flatnose catshark
- Flat-nosed pitviper
- Chapa flat-nosed snake
- Persian cat
