= Nichols's worm eel =

Scientific classification
- Kingdom: Animalia
- Phylum: Chordata
- Class: Actinopterygii
- Order: Anguilliformes
- Family: Ophichthidae
- Genus: Scolecenchelys
- Species: S. nicholsae

Binomial name
- Scolecenchelys nicholsae (Waite, 1904)

Synonyms
- Muraenichthys nicholsae Waite, 1904

Species of fish

Nichols's worm eel (Scolecenchelys nicholsae) is an eel in the family Ophichthidae (worm/snake eels). It was described by Edgar Ravenswood Waite in 1904, originally under the genus Muraenichthys.

It is a marine, subtropical eel which is known from Lord Howe Island and Norfolk Island, in the southwestern Pacific Ocean. It is known to dwell at a depth of 25 metres (82 ft).
