= Scolecenchelys iredalei =

Scientific classification
- Domain: Eukaryota
- Kingdom: Animalia
- Phylum: Chordata
- Class: Actinopterygii
- Order: Anguilliformes
- Family: Ophichthidae
- Genus: Scolecenchelys
- Species: S. iredalei

Binomial name
- Scolecenchelys iredalei (Whitley, 1927)

Synonyms
- Muraenichthys iredalei Whitley 1927; Muraenichthys erythraeensis Bauchot & Maugé, 1980; Muraenichthys erythraensis Bauchot & Maugé, 1980; Scolecenchelys erythraeensis (Bauchot & Maugé, 1980)

Species of fish

Scolecenchelys iredalei is a species of eel in the worm/snake eel family Ophichthidae. It was first described in the genus Muraenichthys by Gilbert Percy Whitley in 1927 and named in honour of ornithologist-malacologist Tom Iredale from the Australian Museum.

Scolecenchelys iredalei is a tropical, marine eel that is widespread in the Indo-West Pacific. It is associated with reefs and can grow to 20 cm (7.9 in) total length.
