= Sharpnose worm eel =

Scientific classification
- Kingdom: Animalia
- Phylum: Chordata
- Class: Actinopterygii
- Order: Anguilliformes
- Family: Ophichthidae
- Genus: Scolecenchelys
- Species: S. acutirostris

Binomial name
- Scolecenchelys acutirostris (Weber & de Beaufort, 1916)

Synonyms
- Muraenichthys acutirostris Weber & de Beaufort, 1916

Species of fish

The sharpnose worm eel (Scolecenchelys acutirostris) is an eel in the family Ophichthidae (worm/snake eels). It was described by Max Carl Wilhelm Weber and Lieven Ferdinand de Beaufort, originally under the genus Muraenichthys. It is a marine, tropical eel which is known from Indonesia, in the western Pacific Ocean. It inhabits sandy areas near reefs. Males can reach a maximum total length of 10 centimetres (3.9 in).
