= Chlopsis slusserorum =

Scientific classification
- Kingdom: Animalia
- Phylum: Chordata
- Class: Actinopterygii
- Order: Anguilliformes
- Family: Chlopsidae
- Genus: Chlopsis
- Species: C. slusserorum

Binomial name
- Chlopsis slusserorum Tighe & McCosker, 2003

Species of fish

Chlopsis slusserorum is an eel in the family Chlopsidae. It was described by Kenneth A. Tighe and John E. McCosker in 2003. It is a marine, deep-water eel which is known from Fiji and the Solomon Islands, in the western central Pacific Ocean. It typically dwells at a depth of 366–487 m. Males can reach a maximum total length of 14.1 cm.

The specific epithet honours Marion and Willis Slusser, whom the authors credit with supporting research and education in natural history.
