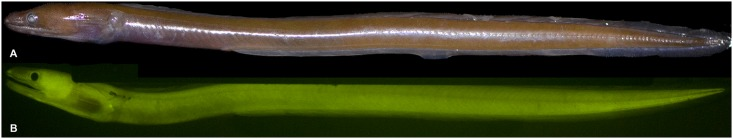
- Kaupichthys hyoproroides under white light (top) and green fluorescent light (bottom)

Scientific classification
- Domain: Eukaryota
- Kingdom: Animalia
- Phylum: Chordata
- Class: Actinopterygii
- Order: Anguilliformes
- Family: Chlopsidae
- Genus: Kaupichthys
- Species: K. hyoproroides

Binomial name
- Kaupichthys hyoproroides (Strömman, 1896)

Synonyms
- Leptocephalus hyoproroides Strömman, 1896; Kaupichthys hypoproroides (Strömman, 1896) (misspelling); Kaupichthys atlanticus Böhlke, 1956

= Kaupichthys hyoproroides =

Species of fish

Kaupichthys hyoproroides, the false moray, common false moray, grey reef eel, reef eel, plain false moray, or double-toothed xenocongrid eel, is an eel in the family Chlopsidae. It was described by Pehr Hugo Strömman in 1896, originally under the genus Leptocephalus. It is a subtropical, marine eel which is known from coral reefs and rocky shores in the western Atlantic Ocean, including southeastern Florida, USA; the Bahamas, Yucatan, Mexico; the Antilles, and Venezuela. It is a benthic, solitary eel that typically dwells at depths to 95 m. Males can reach a maximum total length of 30 cm.

Due to their similarities, Kaupichthys hyoproroides is sometimes considered synonymous with K. diodontus (more commonly known as the common false moray), but some authors list them as distinct species.
