= Scolecenchelys profundorum =

Scientific classification
- Kingdom: Animalia
- Phylum: Chordata
- Class: Actinopterygii
- Order: Anguilliformes
- Family: Ophichthidae
- Genus: Scolecenchelys
- Species: S. profundorum

Binomial name
- Scolecenchelys profundorum (McCosker & Parin, 1995)

Synonyms
- Muraenichthys profundorum McCosker & Parin, 1995

Species of fish

Scolecenchelys profundorum is an eel in the family Ophichthidae (worm/snake eels). It was described by John E. McCosker and Nikolai Vasilyevich Parin in 1995, originally under the genus Muraenichthys. It is a marine, deep water-dwelling eel which is endemic to the Nazca Ridge in the southeastern Pacific Ocean. It is known to dwell at a depth of 310 metres (1,020 ft). Males can reach a maximum total length of 33.4 centimetres (13.1 in).

The species epithet "profundorum" means "of the depths" in Latin, and refers to the deep-water habitat of the eel.
