= Draculo =

Scientific classification
- Kingdom: Animalia
- Phylum: Chordata
- Class: Actinopterygii
- Division: Teleostei
- Order: Syngnathiformes
- Family: Callionymidae
- Genus: Draculo; Snyder, 1911

Type species
- Draculo mirabilis Snyder, 1911

Species
- See text

Synonyms
- Charibarbitus J. L. B. Smith, 1963; Clathropus J. L. B. Smith, 1966; Pogonymus Gosline 1959

Genus of fishes

Draculo is a genus of dragonets found mainly in the tropical waters of the western Indo-Pacific.

== Species ==
There are currently five recognized species in this genus:

- Draculo celetus (J. L. B. Smith, 1963) (Dainty dragonet)
- Draculo maugei (J. L. B. Smith, 1966) (Maugé's dragone)
- Draculo mirabilis Snyder, 1911 (Wonder dragonet)
- Draculo pogognathus (Gosline, 1959) (Hawaiian wonder dragonet)
- Draculo shango (W. P. Davis & C. R. Robins, 1966) (Shango dragonet)
