= Philippines worm eel =

Scientific classification
- Kingdom: Animalia
- Phylum: Chordata
- Class: Actinopterygii
- Order: Anguilliformes
- Family: Ophichthidae
- Genus: Muraenichthys
- Species: M. philippinensis

Binomial name
- Muraenichthys philippinensis Schultz & Woods, 1949

Species of fish

The Philippines worm eel (Muraenichthys philippinensis) is an eel in the family Ophichthidae (worm/snake eels). It was described by Leonard Peter Schultz and Loren P. Woods in 1949. It is a marine, tropical eel which is known from the Philippines (from which its species epithet and common name are derived), in the western central Pacific Ocean. It is known to dwell at a depth of 59 metres (194 ft), and inhabits sandy sediments. Males can reach a maximum total length of 30 centimetres (12 in).
