= Indo-Pacific slender worm-eel =

Scientific classification
- Kingdom: Animalia
- Phylum: Chordata
- Class: Actinopterygii
- Order: Anguilliformes
- Family: Ophichthidae
- Genus: Scolecenchelys
- Species: S. gymnota

Binomial name
- Scolecenchelys gymnota (Bleeker, 1857)

Synonyms
- Muraenichthys gymnotus Bleeker, 1857; Scolecenchelys gymnotus (Bleeker, 1857); Muaenichthys gymnotus Bleeker, 1857; Sphagebranchus huysmani Weber, 1913; Muraenichthys fowleri Schultz, 1943

Species of fish

The Indo-Pacific slender worm-eel (Scolecenchelys gymnota, also known as the Slender worm eel) is an eel in the family Ophichthidae (worm/snake eels). It was described by Pieter Bleeker in 1857. It is a marine, tropical eel which is known from the Indo-Pacific, including the Red Sea, East Africa, the Line Islands, the Society Islands, Johnston Island, Japan, Rapa Iti, Micronesia, and the southern Great Barrier Reef. It forms burrows in inshore sediments of loose gravel and sand. Males can reach a maximum total length of 38 centimetres (15 in).
