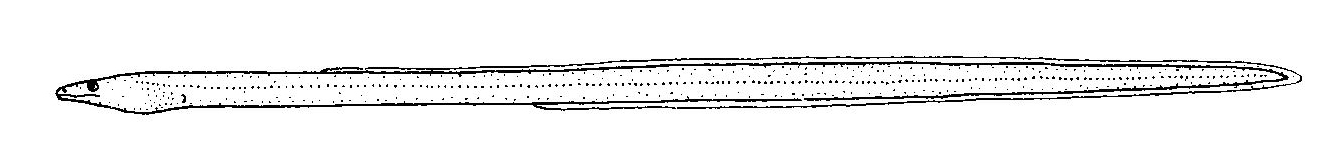
- Drawing by Dr Tony Ayling

Scientific classification
- Kingdom: Animalia
- Phylum: Chordata
- Class: Actinopterygii
- Order: Anguilliformes
- Family: Ophichthidae
- Genus: Scolecenchelys
- Species: S. breviceps

Binomial name
- Scolecenchelys breviceps (Günther, 1876)

= Long-finned worm eel =

Species of fish

The long-finned worm eel or short-headed worm eel, Scolecenchelys breviceps, is a snake eel of the genus Scolecenchelys, found in southern Australia between Rottnest Island and Tasmania, and around New Zealand, to depths of about 50 m, on sandy or muddy bottoms. Its length is between 40 and 60 cm.

The long-finned worm eel is a Māori traditional delicacy, and is skinned and dried mainly outdoors for a period not exceeding longer than 3 months. The eel is not dangerous to humans, but can pack a fight in the sense of it feeling threatened, where it will nip the person or other mammal as a sense of protection. These eels are also very difficult to handle by hand and can be without water for up to 6 or more hours.

The long-finned worm eel is nocturnal, venturing out at night to hunt for invertebrates.
