= Slender snake eel =

Scientific classification
- Kingdom: Animalia
- Phylum: Chordata
- Class: Actinopterygii
- Order: Anguilliformes
- Family: Ophichthidae
- Genus: Scolecenchelys
- Species: S. macroptera

Binomial name
- Scolecenchelys macroptera (Bleeker, 1857)

Synonyms
- Muraenichthys macropterus Bleeker, 1857; Muraenichthys owstoni Jordan & Snyder, 1901; Echidna uniformis Seale, 1901

Species of fish

The slender snake eel (Scolecenchelys macroptera, also known as the narrow worm eel) is an eel in the family Ophichthidae (worm/snake eels). It was described by Pieter Bleeker in 1857. It is a marine, tropical eel which is known from the Indo-Pacific, including East Africa, the Society Islands, the Ryukyu Islands, and the Great Barrier Reef. It dwells at a depth range of 30 to 33 metres (98 to 108 ft), and inhabits sand sediments, tidepools and swamps in mangroves. Males can reach a maximum total length of 25 centimetres (9.8 in).
