= Muraenichthys hattae =

Scientific classification
- Kingdom: Animalia
- Phylum: Chordata
- Class: Actinopterygii
- Order: Anguilliformes
- Family: Ophichthidae
- Genus: Muraenichthys
- Species: M. hattae

Binomial name
- Muraenichthys hattae D. S. Jordan & Snyder, 1901

Species of fish

Muraenichthys hattae is a species of eel in the family Ophichthidae.
