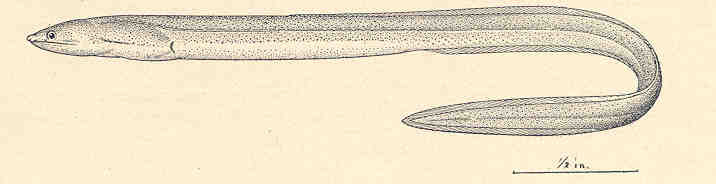

Scientific classification
- Kingdom: Animalia
- Phylum: Chordata
- Class: Actinopterygii
- Order: Anguilliformes
- Family: Ophichthidae
- Genus: Muraenichthys
- Species: M. thompsoni

Binomial name
- Muraenichthys thompsoni Jordan & Richardson, 1908

= Thompson's snake eel =

Species of fish

The Thompson's snake eel (Muraenichthys thompsoni) is an eel in the family Ophichthidae (worm/snake eels). It was described by David Starr Jordan and Robert Earl Richardson in 1908. It is a marine, tropical eel which is known from the western central Pacific Ocean, including Vietnam, Australia, and the Philippines.
