= Scolecenchelys fuscapenis =

Scientific classification
- Kingdom: Animalia
- Phylum: Chordata
- Class: Actinopterygii
- Order: Anguilliformes
- Family: Ophichthidae
- Genus: Scolecenchelys
- Species: S. fuscapenis

Binomial name
- Scolecenchelys fuscapenis McCosker, Ide & Endo, 2012

Species of fish

Scolecenchelys fuscapenis is a species of eels in the family Ophichthidae (worm/snake eels). It was described by John E. McCosker, S. Ide, and Hiromitsu Endo in 2012.
