= Flatnose xenocongrid eel =

Scientific classification
- Domain: Eukaryota
- Kingdom: Animalia
- Phylum: Chordata
- Class: Actinopterygii
- Order: Anguilliformes
- Family: Chlopsidae
- Genus: Chilorhinus
- Species: C. platyrhynchus

Binomial name
- Chilorhinus platyrhynchus (Norman, 1922)

Synonyms
- Brachyconger platyrhynchus Norman, 1922

Species of fish

The flatnose xenocongrid eel, flat-nosed xenocongrid eel, or flat-nosed conger eel, Chilorhinus platyrhynchus, is an eel in the family Chlopsidae. It was described by John Roxborough Norman in 1922, originally under the genus Brachyconger. It is a tropical marine eel which is known from the Pacific Ocean. It typically dwells at depths from 5 to 25 m, and leads a benthic lifestyle. Males can reach a maximum standard length of 17.8 cm.
