= Siboga worm eel =

Scientific classification
- Kingdom: Animalia
- Phylum: Chordata
- Class: Actinopterygii
- Order: Anguilliformes
- Family: Ophichthidae
- Genus: Muraenichthys
- Species: M. sibogae

Binomial name
- Muraenichthys sibogae Weber & de Beaufort, 1916

Species of fish

The Siboga worm eel (Muraenichthys sibogae) is an eel in the family Ophichthidae (worm/snake eels). It was described by Max Carl Wilhelm Weber and Lieven Ferdinand de Beaufort in 1916. It is a marine, tropical eel which is known from reefs in Timor and Samoa, in the Pacific Ocean. Males can reach a maximum total length of 13.5 centimetres (5.3 in).
