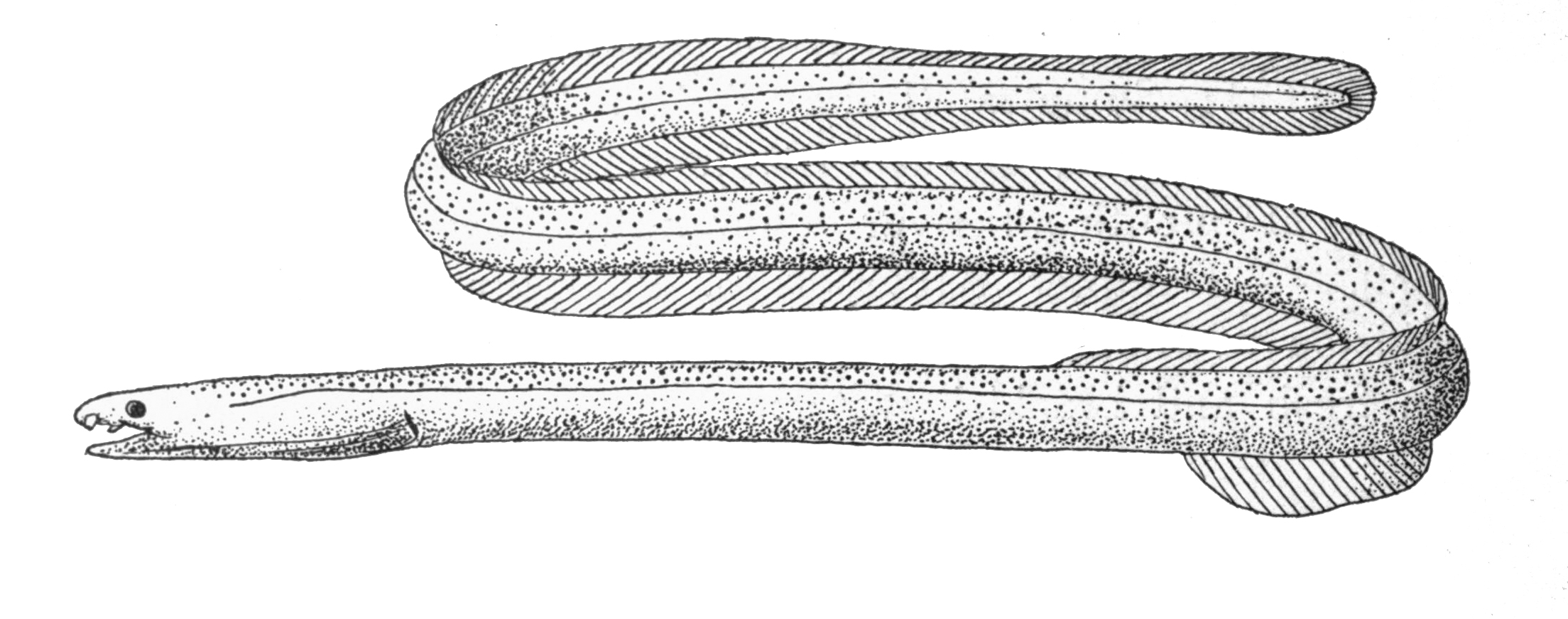

Scientific classification
- Domain: Eukaryota
- Kingdom: Animalia
- Phylum: Chordata
- Class: Actinopterygii
- Order: Anguilliformes
- Family: Ophichthidae
- Genus: Muraenichthys
- Species: M. gymnopterus

Binomial name
- Muraenichthys gymnopterus (Bleeker, 1853)

Synonyms
- Muraena gymnopterus Bleeker, 1853; Muraenichthys microstomus Bleeker, 1864

= Muraenichthys gymnopterus =

Species of eel in the family Ophichthidae

Muraenichthys gymnopterus is an eel in the family Ophichthidae (worm/snake eels). It was described by Pieter Bleeker in 1853, originally under the genus Muraena. It is a marine, tropical eel which is known from the western Pacific Ocean, including China, Indonesia, and India. It inhabits rocky reefs in shallow, warm seas. Males can reach a maximum total length of 30 centimetres (12 in).

The diet of M. gymnopterus consists of finfish and phytoplankton.
