= Powellichthys =

Conservation status
- Data Deficient (IUCN 3.1)

Scientific classification
- Kingdom: Animalia
- Phylum: Chordata
- Class: Actinopterygii
- Order: Anguilliformes
- Family: Chlopsidae
- Genus: Powellichthys; J. L. B. Smith, 1966
- Species: P. ventriosus

Binomial name
- Powellichthys ventriosus J. L. B. Smith, 1966

Genus of eels

Powellichthys is a genus of eels in the family Chlopsidae. The sole species is Powellichthys ventriosus, which inhabits tropical reefs around the Cook Islands in the central western Pacific Ocean. It is a non-migratory species.
