= Catesbya =

Conservation status
- Data Deficient (IUCN 3.1)

Scientific classification
- Kingdom: Animalia
- Phylum: Chordata
- Class: Actinopterygii
- Order: Anguilliformes
- Family: Chlopsidae
- Genus: Catesbya; J. E. Böhlke & D. G. Smith, 1992
- Species: C. pseudomuraena

Binomial name
- Catesbya pseudomuraena J. E. Böhlke & D. G. Smith, 1992

Genus of fishes

Catesbya is a genus of eel in the family Chlopsidae (false moray eels). It contains the single species Catesbya pseudomuraena, which inhabits tropical reefs around the Bahamas in the central western Atlantic Ocean. It dwells at a depth range of 0 to 9 metres (0 to 30 ft). Males can reach a maximum total length of 13.9 centimetres (5.5 in).
