= Common false moray =

Scientific classification
- Domain: Eukaryota
- Kingdom: Animalia
- Phylum: Chordata
- Class: Actinopterygii
- Order: Anguilliformes
- Family: Chlopsidae
- Genus: Kaupichthys
- Species: K. diodontus

Binomial name
- Kaupichthys diodontus L. P. Schultz, 1943

Species of fish

The common false moray, false moray, grey reef eel, or plain false moray, (Kaupichthys diodontus), is an eel in the family Chlopsidae. It was described by Leonard Peter Schultz in 1943. It is a tropical, marine eel which is known from seaward reefs in the Indo-Pacific regions. It typically dwells at a depth around 56 metres (184 ft). Males can reach a maximum total length of 30 centimetres (12 in).

Due to their similarities, Kaupichthys diodontus is sometimes considered synonymous with K. hyoproroides (more commonly known as the false moray), but some authors list them as distinct species.
