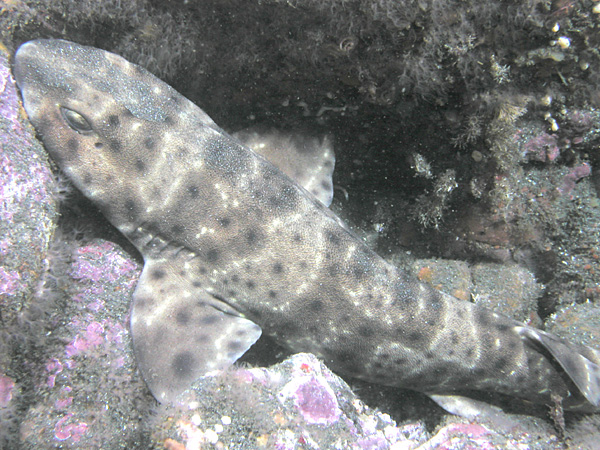

Conservation status
- Least Concern (IUCN 3.1)

Scientific classification
- Kingdom: Animalia
- Phylum: Chordata
- Class: Chondrichthyes
- Subclass: Elasmobranchii
- Division: Selachii
- Order: Carcharhiniformes
- Family: Scyliorhinidae
- Genus: Cephaloscyllium
- Species: C. ventriosum

Binomial name
- Cephaloscyllium ventriosum (Garman, 1880)

Synonyms
- Scyllium ventriosum (Garman, 1880); Cephaloscyllium uter (Jordan & Gilbert, 1896); Catulus uter (Jordan & Gilbert, 1896))

= Swell shark =

Species of shark

The swell shark (Cephaloscyllium ventriosum) is a catshark in the family Scyliorhinidae. It is found in the tropical and subtropical eastern Pacific Ocean from between central California to southern Mexico, with an additional population off the coast of Chile. They are known to have brown and white spots along with broad heads. As a defense, the swell shark is able to expand to approximately double its regular size by swallowing water. They depend on electrical signals to find prey, camouflaging in rocky crevices.

== Taxonomy ==
When discovered in 1880, the swell shark was first described as Scyllium ventriosum, but was later changed to Cephaloscyllium ventriosum. The genus name comes from the Greek word kephale, which means "head", and skylla, which means a certain kind of shark. The species name comes from the Latin word ventrĭōsus, which means "large-bellied". The species name refers to its ability to enlarge itself by taking in water.

== Distribution and habitat ==
The swell shark is found in the eastern Pacific Ocean, from the central California coast to southern Mexico. There is an additional population off the coast of Chile. It can be found between the depths of 5 and 457 m (16 and 1,499 ft), but is most common between 5 and 37 m (16 and 121 ft).

Swell sharks are often found over algae-covered rocky bottoms where it hides in crevices during the day.

== Description ==
Swell sharks are typically around 90 cm (35 in) in length, with a maximum length of 110 cm (43 in). They have flat, broad heads with large gold eyes that have nictitating eyelids. Swell sharks have a yellow-brown coloration, with brown and white spots. The spots cover their underside, but are not present on their fins. Usually the younger sharks are lighter in color than the adults. The gills of a swell shark are usually very small and tight.

Every swell shark has around 55–60 teeth. Teeth typically have three smooth cusps, but can have as many as five cusps. The middle cusp is the longest.

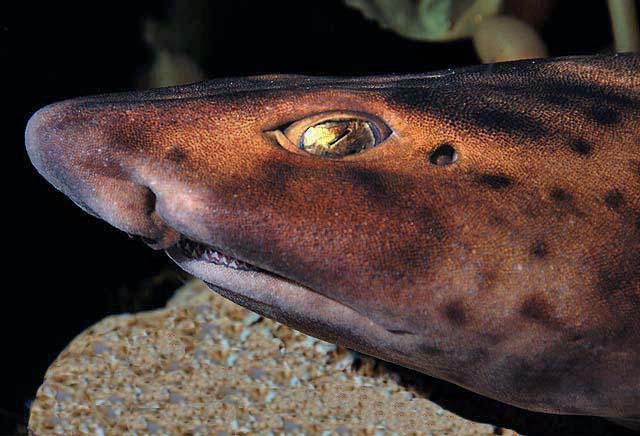
Head

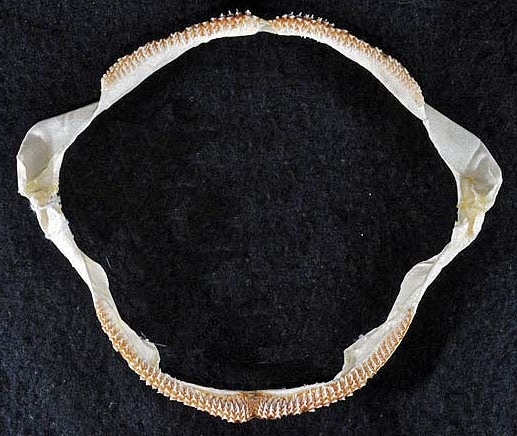
Jaws

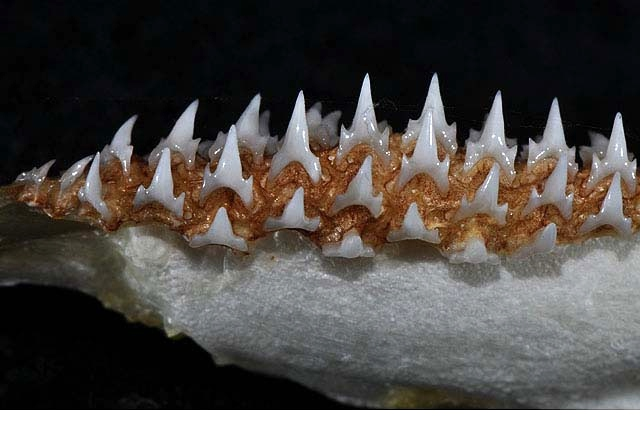
Lower teeth

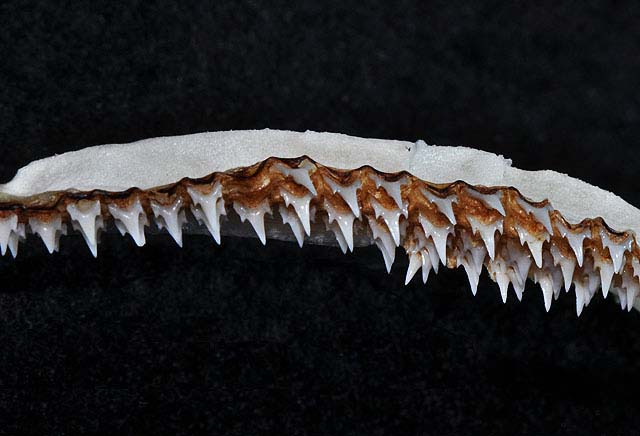
Upper teeth

== Ecology ==
Swell sharks are nocturnal and sleep in rock crevices during the day, where their appearance allows them to be camouflaged. They are very sociable and are commonly seen sleeping next to or on top of other sharks.

=== Reproduction ===
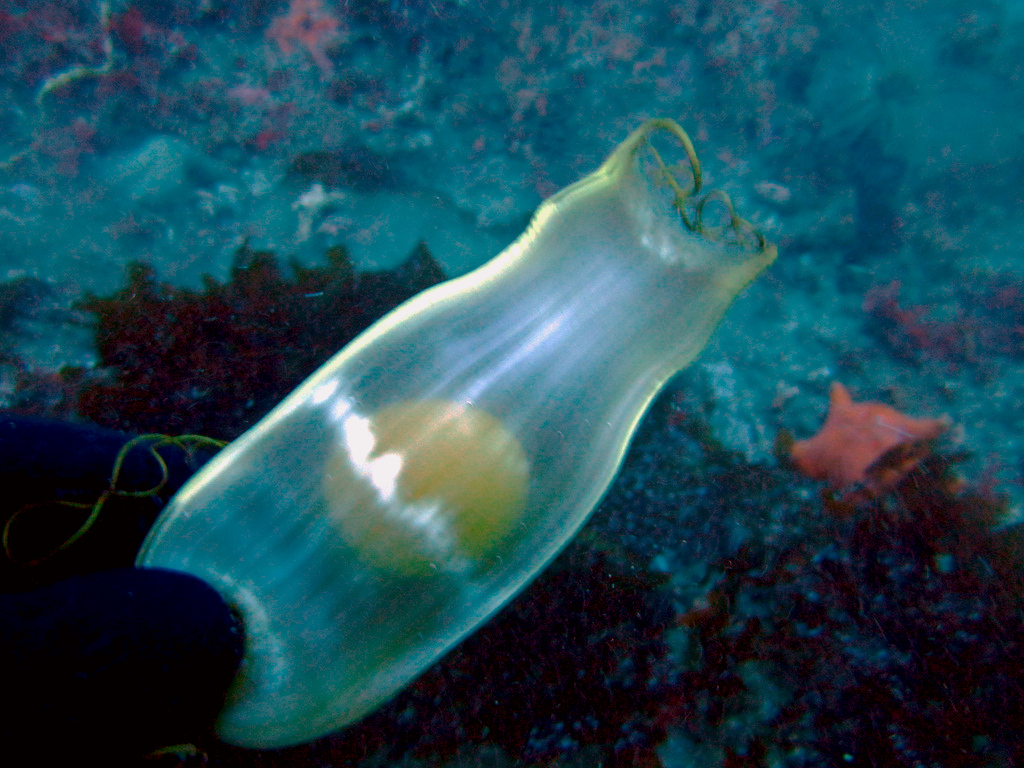
Egg case with yolk

The swell shark is oviparous, laying two green or amber flattened eggs at a time. Fertilization occurs internally. The egg cases become attached to kelp or the reef with tendrils. It has been suggested that the length of the tendrils depends on the amount of surf action the region is under. After producing the egg case, no parental care is provided. The egg case which contains the embryo is approximately 2.5 centimeters (0.98 in)–5.1 centimeters (2.0 in) by 7.6 centimeters (3.0 in)–13 centimeters (5.1 in). The embryos will feed solely on yolk before they hatch. The gestation time depends on water temperature but is typically between 9–12 months. Pups have a double row of enlarged dermal denticles to help them exit the eggcase. After hatching, the pup is approximately 15 cm (5.9 in) in length and is fully self-sufficient.

=== Diet ===
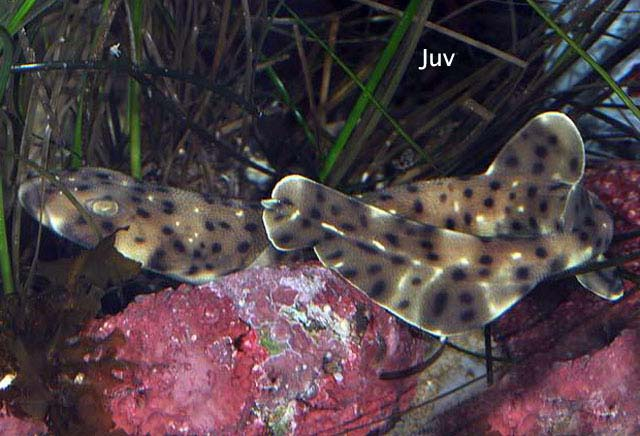
Juvenile swell shark bending into a U-shape

Swell sharks hunt at night for bony fish, molluscs, and crustaceans. They will eat prey that is dead or alive. They feed either by sucking prey into their mouth or by waiting motionless on the sea floor with their mouth open, waiting to encounter prey. Swell sharks have also been known to look for food in lobster traps.

=== Predation ===
Swell sharks feed predominantly in nighttime conditions, using an ambush strategy to attack prey. Sensory modality in swell sharks allow for detection of prey up to 20 cm in small sharks through electric fields emitted by such prey.

=== Defense ===
When the shark feels threatened, it will bend its body into a U–shape, grab its tail fin with its mouth, and suck in water. Doing so causes the shark to enlarge in diameter and makes it much harder for predators to bite or dislodge. The swell shark is capable of swelling by using water or air, which is stored in the stomach until released. When letting air out, the swell shark makes a dog-like bark. Swell sharks are non-aggressive and are considered harmless to humans.

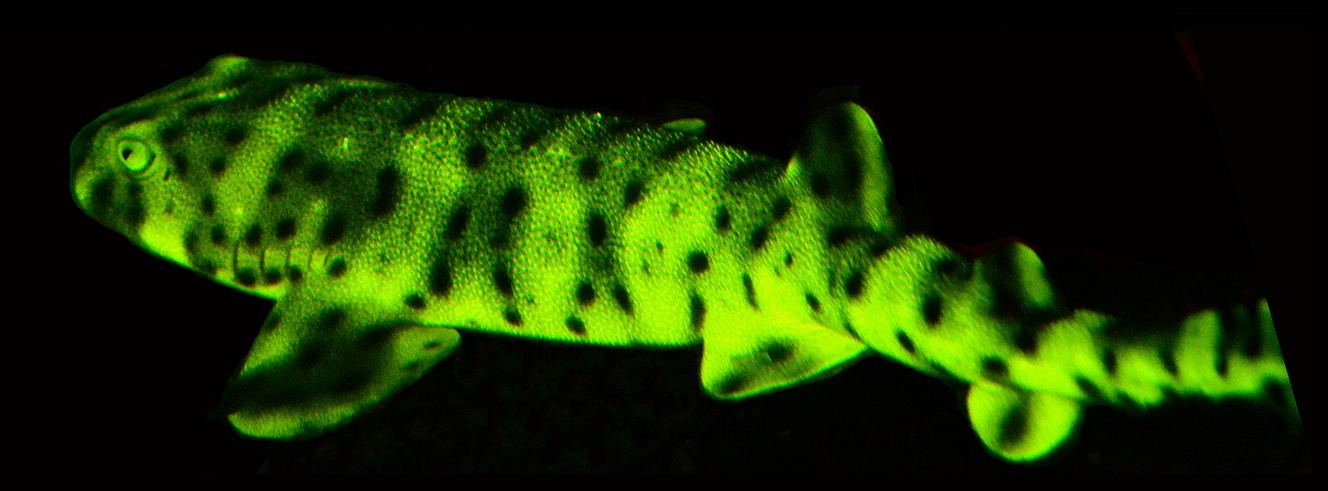
Biofluorescence of the swell shark

=== Biofluorescence ===
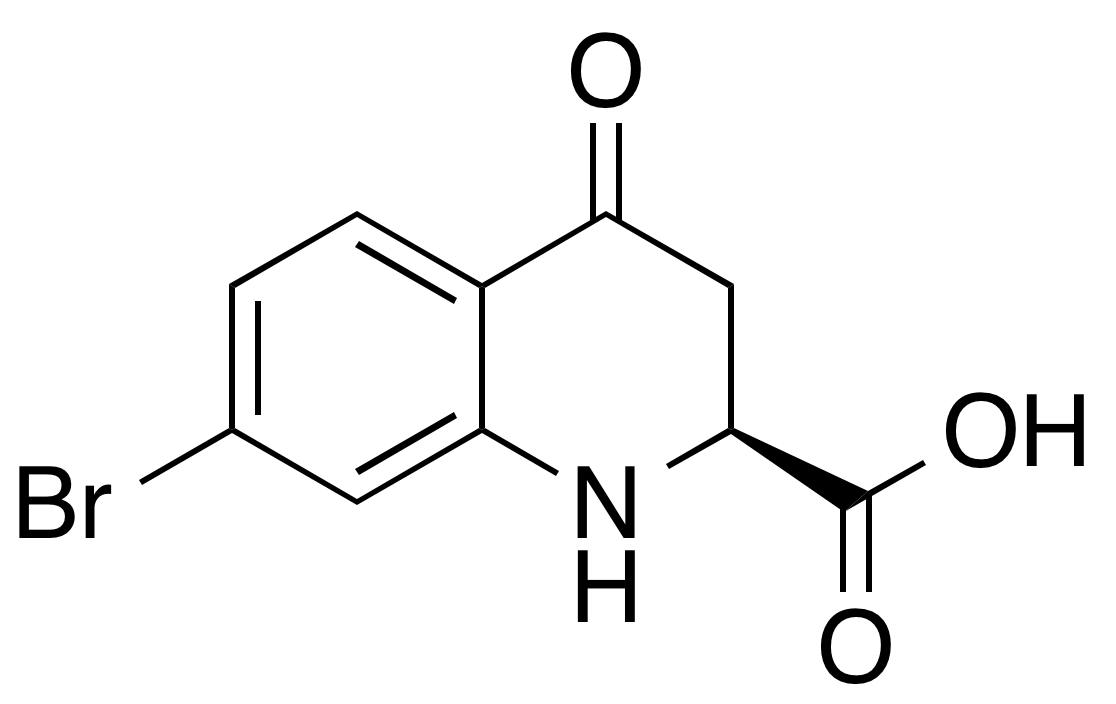
8-Bromo-kynurenine yellow, a fluorescent pigment found in the skin of the swell shark

Swell shark biofluorescence was first reported in 2014. Researchers presented species-specific emission patterns, indicating that biofluorescence potentially functions in intraspecific communication and assists camouflage. The key fluorescent pigments in the swell shark and the chain catshark are a set of brominated kynurenine compounds that appear to be synthesized by the kynurenine pathway starting from 6-bromo-tryptophan. The biochemical origin of 6-bromo-tryptophan in these species is not known.

== Conservation status ==
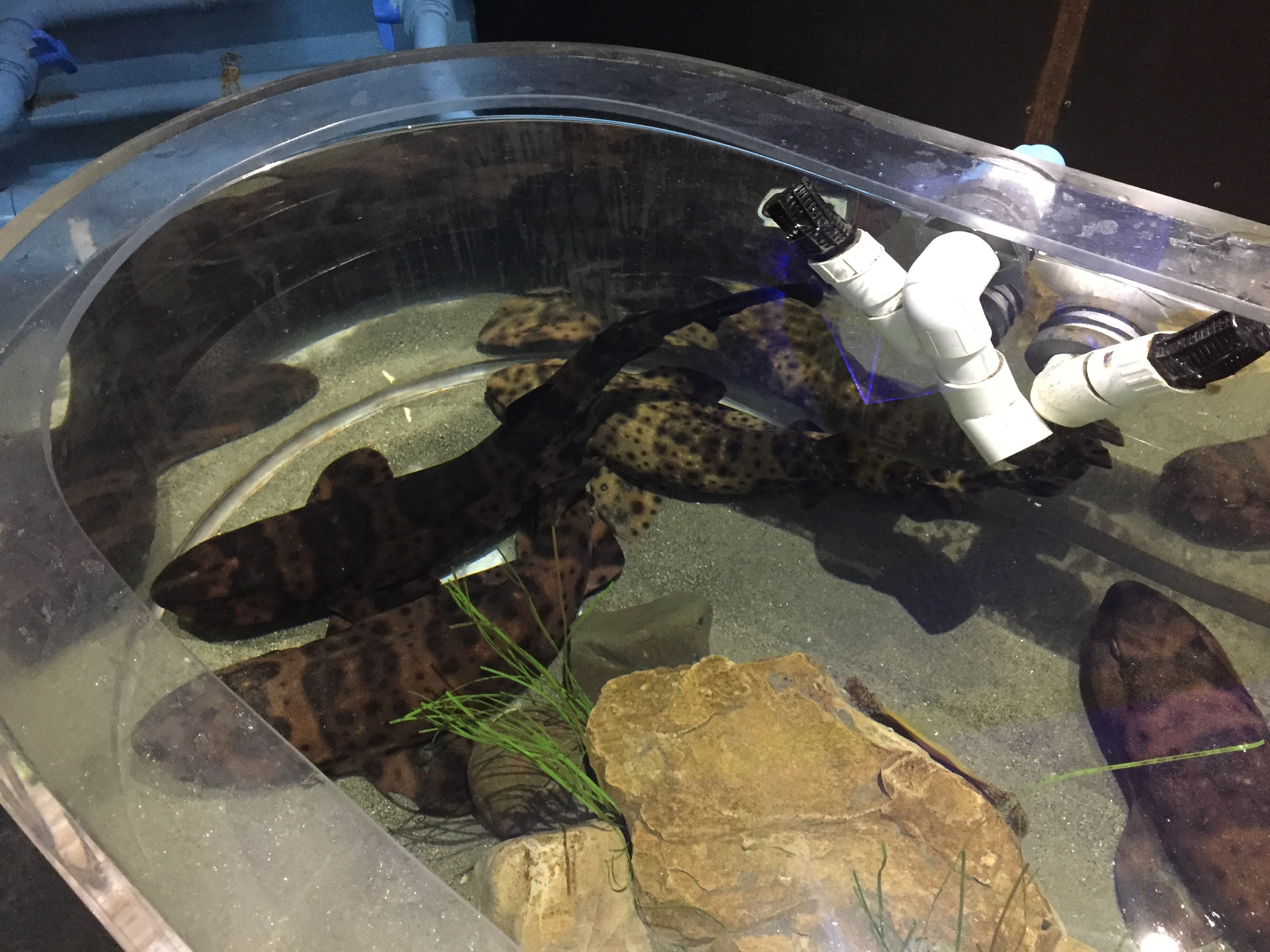
Swell shark touch tank at the Central Coast Aquarium in Avila Beach, California

There are no fishery operations that target swell sharks; however, they are occasionally caught as bycatch in lobster and crab traps, gillnets, and trawls. Swell sharks are not typically consumed by humans due to the poor quality of meat. Swell sharks are common in public aquariums, in part due to their longevity in captivity. The IUCN has assessed the swell shark as "least concern".
