= Redfin worm-eel =

Scientific classification
- Kingdom: Animalia
- Phylum: Chordata
- Class: Actinopterygii
- Order: Anguilliformes
- Family: Ophichthidae
- Genus: Scolecenchelys
- Species: S. laticaudata

Binomial name
- Scolecenchelys laticaudata (Ogilby, 1897)

Synonyms
- Myropterura laticaudata Ogilby, 1897; Muraenichthys laticaudata (Ogilby, 1897); Muraenichthys laticaudatus (Ogilby, 1897)

Species of fish

The redfin worm-eel (Scolecenchelys laticaudata, also known as the pearlbelly snake-eel) is an eel in the family Ophichthidae (worm/snake eels). It was described by James Douglas Ogilby in 1897, originally under the genus Myropterura. It is a marine, tropical eel which is known from the Indo-Pacific and southeastern Atlantic Ocean, including the Red Sea, East and South Africa, Ducie Island, and Lord Howe Island. It dwells at a depth range of 1 to 26 metres (3.3 to 85.3 ft), and inhabits lagoons and reefs, forming colonies in sand sediments in confined areas. Males can reach a maximum total length of 35 centimetres (14 in).
