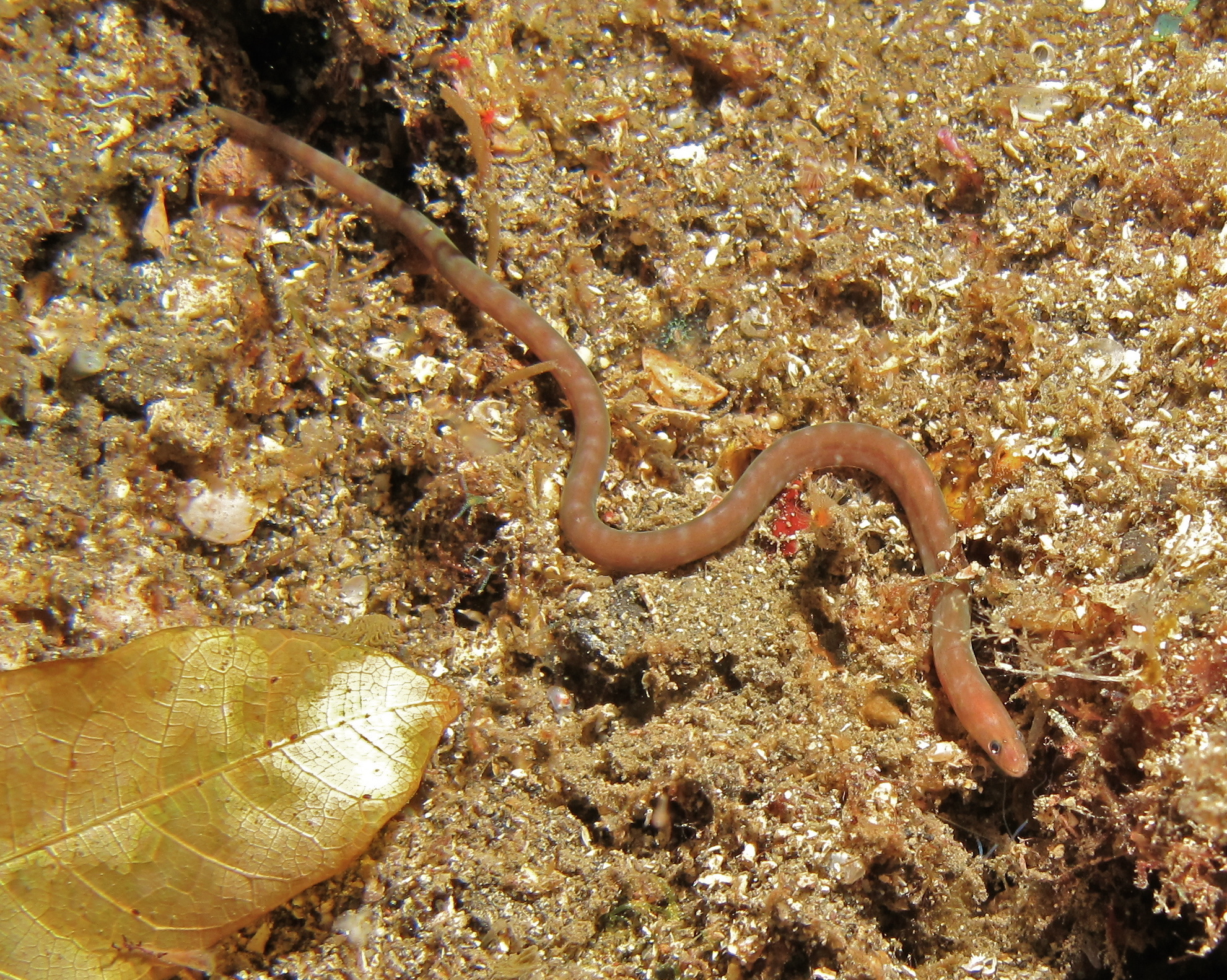
- Scolecenchelys breviceps

Scientific classification
- Kingdom: Animalia
- Phylum: Chordata
- Class: Actinopterygii
- Division: Teleostei
- Order: Anguilliformes
- Family: Ophichthidae
- Subfamily: Myrophinae
- Genus: Scolecenchelys; J. D. Ogilby, 1897

Type species
- Muraenichthys australis Macleay, 1881

= Scolecenchelys =

Genus of eels

Scolecenchelys is a genus of eels in the snake eel family Ophichthidae.

== Species ==
There are currently 21 recognized species in this genus:

- Scolecenchelys acutirostris (M. C. W. Weber & de Beaufort, 1916) (Sharp-nose worm eel)
- Scolecenchelys aoki (D. S. Jordan & Snyder, 1901) (Misaki worm eel)
- Scolecenchelys australis (W. J. Macleay, 1881) (Short-fin worm eel)
- Scolecenchelys brevicaudata Hibino & Kimura, 2015 (Short-tail worm eel)
- Scolecenchelys breviceps (Günther, 1876) (Short-headed worm eel)
- Scolecenchelys castlei J. E. McCosker, 2006 (Deep-water bigeyed worm eel)
- Scolecenchelys chilensis (J. E. McCosker, 1970) (Chilean worm eel)
- Scolecenchelys cookei (Fowler, 1928)
- Scolecenchelys fuscapenis J. E. McCosker, S. Ide & Endo, 2012 (Black-tailed worm eel)
- Scolecenchelys fuscogularis Hibino, Y. Kai & Kimura, 2013 (Dark-throat worm eel)
- Scolecenchelys godeffroyi (Regan, 1909) (Godeffroy worm eel)
- Scolecenchelys gymnota (Bleeker, 1857) (Slender worm eel)
- Scolecenchelys iredalei (Whitley, 1927) (Coral worm eel)
- Scolecenchelys laticaudata (J. D. Ogilby, 1897) (Red-fin worm eel)
- Scolecenchelys macroptera (Bleeker, 1857) (Narrow worm eel)
- Scolecenchelys nicholsae (Waite, 1904) (Nichols' worm eel)
- Scolecenchelys profundorum (J. E. McCosker & Parin, 1995) (Deep-water worm eel)
- Scolecenchelys puhioilo (J. E. McCosker, 1979)
- Scolecenchelys robusta Hibino & Kimura, 2015 (Robust worm eel)
- Scolecenchelys vermiformis (W. K. H. Peters, 1866)
- Scolecenchelys xorae (J. L. B. Smith, 1958) (Orange-head worm eel)
