= Deepwater big-eyed worm eel =

Scientific classification
- Kingdom: Animalia
- Phylum: Chordata
- Class: Actinopterygii
- Order: Anguilliformes
- Family: Ophichthidae
- Genus: Scolecenchelys
- Species: S. castlei

Binomial name
- Scolecenchelys castlei McCosker, 2006

Species of fish

The deepwater big-eyed worm eel (Scolecenchelys castlei) is an eel in the family Ophichthidae (worm/snake eels). It was described by John E. McCosker in 2006. It is a subtropical, marine eel which is known from New Zealand, in the southwestern Pacific Ocean. It dwells at a depth range of 425–820 metres. Females can reach a maximum total length of 58 centimetres.

The species epithet "castlei" was given in honour of Peter Henry John Castle.
