= Long-toothed false moray =

Scientific classification
- Domain: Eukaryota
- Kingdom: Animalia
- Phylum: Chordata
- Class: Actinopterygii
- Order: Anguilliformes
- Family: Chlopsidae
- Genus: Boehlkenchelys; Tighe, 1992
- Species: B. longidentata

Binomial name
- Boehlkenchelys longidentata Tighe, 1992

Synonyms
- Boehlkenchelys longicaudatus Tighe, 1992

Species of fish

The long-toothed false moray (Boehlkenchelys longidentata) is an eel of the family Chlopsidae which inhabits tropical reefs around the Chagos Archipelago in the Indian Ocean, Ambon Island in Indonesia, and Fiji and Palau in the Pacific Ocean. It is the only species in its genus. The genus Boehlkenchelys is named for J.E. and E.B. Boehlke.
