= Muraenichthys malabonensis =

Scientific classification
- Kingdom: Animalia
- Phylum: Chordata
- Class: Actinopterygii
- Order: Anguilliformes
- Family: Ophichthidae
- Genus: Muraenichthys
- Species: M. malabonensis

Binomial name
- Muraenichthys malabonensis Herre, 1923

Species of fish

Muraenichthys malabonensis is a species of eel in the family Ophichthidae.
