= Bicolor false moray =

Scientific classification
- Kingdom: Animalia
- Phylum: Chordata
- Class: Actinopterygii
- Order: Anguilliformes
- Family: Chlopsidae
- Genus: Chlopsis
- Species: C. bicollaris

Binomial name
- Chlopsis bicollaris (Myers & Wade, 1941)

Synonyms
- Garmanichthys bicollaris Myers & Wade, 1941

Species of fish

The bicolor false moray (Chlopsis bicollaris) is an eel in the family Chlopsidae. It was described by George S. Myers and Charles Barkley Wade in 1941, originally under the genus Garmanichthys. It is a tropical, marine eel which is known from around the Galapagos Islands in the southeastern Pacific Ocean. Males are known to reach a maximum total length of 20 cm.

Due to the species' endemicity to the Galapagos Islands and its 1200-km^{2}-area of occupancy, the IUCN redlist currently lists the bicolor false moray as Near Threatened.
