= Draculo pogognathus =

Scientific classification
- Kingdom: Animalia
- Phylum: Chordata
- Class: Actinopterygii
- Division: Teleostei
- Order: Syngnathiformes
- Family: Callionymidae
- Genus: Draculo
- Species: D. pogognathus

Binomial name
- Draculo pogognathus Gosline, 1959

Species of fish

Draculo pogognathus, the Hawaiian wonder dragonet, is a species of marine fish in the family Callionymidae.

== Description ==
Draculo pogognathus has an unusually fringed lip. This helps it keep out any sand when respirating.

== Distribution and habitat ==
Draculo pogognathus can only be found in or surrounding the Hawaiian Islands. It is mostly found in clean sand off beaches with depths that reach 1–4 m (3.3–13.1 ft). Draculo pogognathus buries itself in the sand, and leaves only its eyes open to catch sea floor prey.
