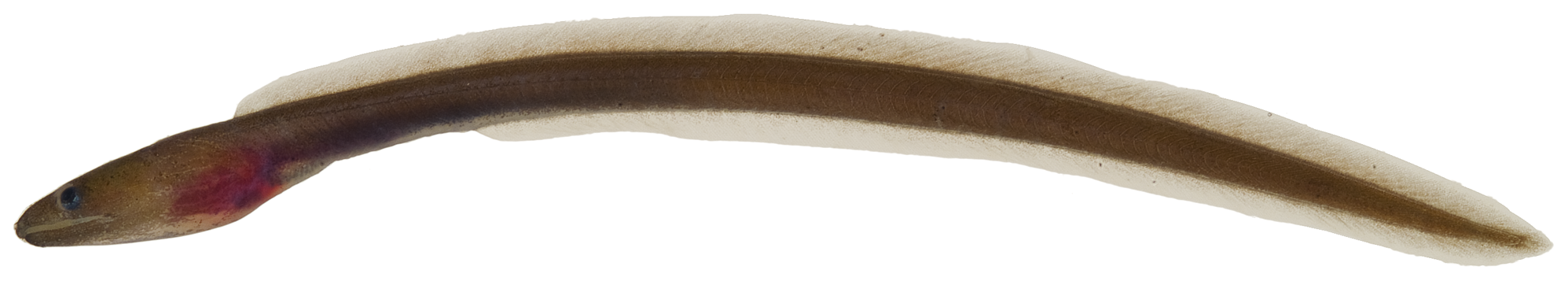
- Kaupichthys hyoproroides

Scientific classification
- Domain: Eukaryota
- Kingdom: Animalia
- Phylum: Chordata
- Class: Actinopterygii
- Order: Anguilliformes
- Family: Chlopsidae
- Genus: Kaupichthys; L. P. Schultz, 1943

Type species
- Kaupichthys diodontus L.P. Schultz, 1943

= Kaupichthys =

Genus of fishes

Kaupichthys is a genus of eels in the family Chlopsidae.

== Etymology ==
The genus is named in honor of German naturalist Johann Jacob Kaup (1803–1873), as a recognition for his work on apodal fishes.

== Species ==
The currently recognized species in this genus are:

- Kaupichthys atronasus L. P. Schultz, 1953 (black-nostril false moray)
- Kaupichthys brachychirus L. P. Schultz, 1953 (shortfin false moray)
- Kaupichthys diodontus L. P. Schultz, 1943 (common false moray)
- Kaupichthys hyoproroides (Strömman, 1896) (false moray)
- Kaupichthys japonicus Matsubara & Asano, 1960
- Kaupichthys nuchalis J. E. Böhlke, 1967 (collared eel)
