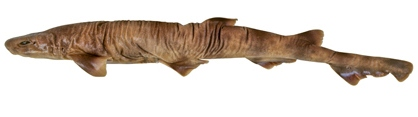

Conservation status
- Data Deficient (IUCN 3.1)

Scientific classification
- Kingdom: Animalia
- Phylum: Chordata
- Class: Chondrichthyes
- Subclass: Elasmobranchii
- Division: Selachii
- Order: Carcharhiniformes
- Family: Pentanchidae
- Genus: Asymbolus
- Species: A. funebris

Binomial name
- Asymbolus funebris Compagno, Stevens & Last, 1999
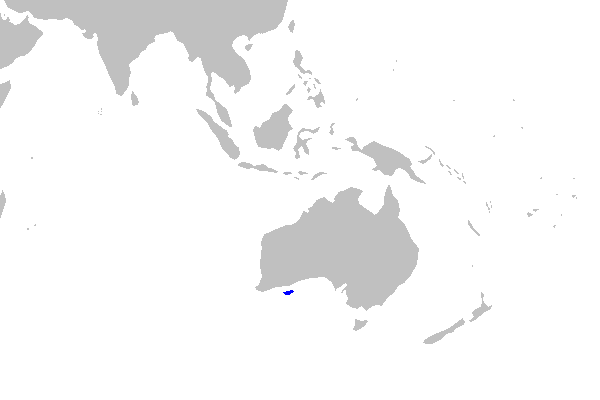
- Range of the Australian blotched catshark

= Asymbolus funebris =

Species of shark

Asymbolus funebris, or the Australian blotched catshark, is a species of shark belonging to the family Pentanchidae, the deepwater catsharks. The only specimen, the holotype, being found off Western Australia at 144 m (472 ft). Its length is 44 cm (17 in) and its reproduction is oviparous.

== See also ==
- Scyliorhinus meadi, also known as the blotched catshark
