= Robinsichthys =

Scientific classification
- Kingdom: Animalia
- Phylum: Chordata
- Class: Actinopterygii
- Order: Gobiiformes
- Family: Gobiidae
- Subfamily: Gobiinae
- Genus: Robinsichthys; Birdsong, 1988

Genus of fish

Robinsichthys is a genus of gobies in the subfamily Gobiinae.

The name of this genus honours C. Richard Robins (1928-2020), an American ichthyologist who was an important contributor to the study of gobies of the Americas.

There are currently two valid species:

- Robinsichthys arrowsmithensis Birdsong, 1988 (Robin's goby)
- Robinsichthys nigrimarginatus Tornabene, Manning, Robertson, Van Tassell & Baldwin, 2022 (black margined goby)
