= Dark throat worm eel =

Conservation status
- Data Deficient (IUCN 3.1)

Scientific classification
- Kingdom: Animalia
- Phylum: Chordata
- Class: Actinopterygii
- Order: Anguilliformes
- Family: Ophichthidae
- Genus: Scolecenchelys
- Species: S. fuscogularis

Binomial name
- Scolecenchelys fuscogularis Y. Hibino, Y. Kai & Seishi Kimura, 2013

Species of fish

The dark throat worm eel (Scolecenchelys fuscogularis) is a species of eel in the family Ophichthidae (worm/snake eels). It was first described by Yusuke Hibino, Yoshiaki Kai, and Seishi Kimura in 2013. It is a marine, temperate water-dwelling eel which is known from Japan, in the northwestern Pacific Ocean. It dwells at a depth range of 90–147 metres. Males can reach a maximum total length of 26.5 centimetres.

The species epithet "fuscogularis" means "dark throat" in Latin, and refers to the dark branchial basket of the eel.
