= Chilorhinus =

Scientific classification
- Kingdom: Animalia
- Phylum: Chordata
- Class: Actinopterygii
- Order: Anguilliformes
- Family: Chlopsidae
- Genus: Chilorhinus; Lütken, 1852

Type species
- Chilorhinus suensonii Lütken, 1852

Genus of fishes

Chilorhinus is a small genus of marine ray-finned fishes belonging to the family Chlopsidae, the false morays. These eels occur in tropical waters

== Species ==
Chilorhinus contains the following two species:

- Chilorhinus platyrhynchus (Norman, 1922) (flatnose xenocongrid eel)
- Chilorhinus suensonii Lütken, 1852 (seagrass eel)
