= C. Richard Robins =

American academic, environmentalist, and ichthyologist (1928–2020)

Charles Richard Robins (November 25, 1928 – November 12, 2020) was an American academic, environmentalist and ichthyologist.

== Early life and university ==
Robins was born on November 25, 1928, in Harrisburg, Pennsylvania, to Helen Ayers Robins and Claude Revere Robins, a jewellery wholesaler (and eventual Mayor of Harrisburg), who was their third and final child. As a child Robins developed an interest in natural history, particularly birds. This early ornithological interest was apparently encouraged by George M. Sutton, the Pennsylvania State Ornithologist. Robins enjoyed the writings of the celebrated ornithologist Arthur Augustus Allen of Cornell University in Ithaca, New York. Robins wanted to study under Allen, so he went to Cornell in 1946, However, by that time the biology department had begun to move from concentrating on ornithology to ichthyology led by Edward C. Raney. Nevertheless, Robins finished his Ph.D. thesis in 1955, revising the eastern North American sculpins which were classified in the two species groups around Cottus bairdii and C. carolinae. However, he remained interested in birds for the rest of his life.

== Career ==
After attaining his PhD, Robins joined the U.S. Army Chemical Corps at their biological warfare facility at Fort Detrick, Maryland, serving for 2 years. In the Army he forged many important professional relationships, and as he stated, “received a lot of shots.” While serving, mainly as a translator, he contracted a mysterious eye infection which meant that he had to wear sunglasses, gave him a blood profile that doctors could not explain and he was told that he could no longer be a blood donor.

After serving in the Army, Robins started work at the University of Miami Marine Laboratory where he worked with John Ernest Randall, who was also to become a noted ichthyologist. Robins stayed at this institution, putting together what eventually became an important collection of tropical Atlantic fishes. He was also the author or coauthor of over 200 research papers, these included more than 100 novel generic and specific names. In the same period he mentored 31 of PhD and 14 Masters students. He was a participant in many submarine surveys, including a survey that went as far as Cuba. With Carleton Ray, he was the coauthor of The Peterson Field Guide to Atlantic Coast Fishes. He volunteered to lecture for undergraduate courses in environmental issues. He was notable in the setting up of the U.S. Environmental Protection Agency (EPA) and for six years he was a member of its advisory board.

In the 1960s, Robins was committee chair for the PhD of Catherine Hale, a taxonomic review of the Synaphobranchidae, a family of deep-sea eels. He had to excuse himself from serving on the committee as he and Catherine had begun a relationship and, in 1965, had married. Catherine continued to work in ichthyology for 20 more years. She is a talented artist, illustrating her own papers as well as those of others, she eventually became a multi prize-winning sculptor.

As well as his published research, Robins was recognized as Teacher of the Year in 1966 by the Marine Science Graduate Student Organization and in 1967 received the University of Miami's Outstanding Teacher Award. In 1990 he was awarded the University of Miami's Sigma Xi Professor of the Year Award. Another honor awarded was being named Jessup Scholar at the Academy of Natural Sciences of Philadelphia in 1960.

The couple retired in 1994, living on 25 acres of land near Lawrence, Kansas, keeping a variety of pets and livestock. Robins was able to continue to work for several years as Professor Emeritus in ichthyology at the University of Kansas.

== Legacy ==
10 species of fishes are named in honor of Robins, including a shark, a moray eel, a grenadier, a cusk eel, a cardinalfish, a basslet, a jawfish, a goby, a flounder, and a sea robin. As well as these, five species have been given the specific name “robinsorum” to honor both Robins and his wife at the same time. He was also honored in the names of the goby genus Robinsichthys and Robinsia, a monotypic genus of false morays, the only species, R. catherineae, was named for Catherine.

Following Robins retirement from the University of Miami Marine Laboratory, the support of the collection of 33,000 fish specimens he created ceased. The Florida Museum of Natural History realised the importance of this collection and consented to take over its upkeep. Dick Robins's son, Rob, also an ichthyologist, curates the collection at the museum.

== Family ==
Robins and Catherine had been married for 55 years. They had three children: Catherine Elaine, an author of fantasy and science fiction under the pen name Elaine Lane; Robert Hale, ichthyology collection manager at the Florida Museum of Natural History; and Colin Richard, a professor of soil science at Claremont McKenna College in California. Robins died of natural causes on November 12, 2020.

== See also ==
- Category:Taxa named by Charles Richard Robins
