= Arrowsmith Bank =

- Submerged bank
- Location within the Caribbean
- Coordinates: 21°5′N 86°28′W
- Sea: Caribbean
- Area: Yucatán Peninsula
- Country: Mexico
- Minimum depth: 22 m

Languages
  - Official: Spanish

Arrowsmith Bank is a submerged bank in Mexico. It is located in the Caribbean Sea off the northeastern end of the Yucatán Peninsula.

== Geography ==
The bank is an underwater area that is wholly submerged. Its depths range between 25 and 400 m.
