= Robinsia =

Conservation status
- Least Concern (IUCN 3.1)

Scientific classification
- Kingdom: Animalia
- Phylum: Chordata
- Class: Actinopterygii
- Order: Anguilliformes
- Family: Chlopsidae
- Genus: Robinsia; J. E. Böhlke & D. G. Smith, 1967
- Species: R. catherinae

Binomial name
- Robinsia catherinae J. E. Böhlke & D. G. Smith, 1967

Synonyms
- Robinsia caterinae Böhlke & Smith, 1967

Genus of fishes

Robinsia is a genus of eels in the family Chlopsidae. The sole species is Robinsia catherinae, which inhabits tropical waters around Kenya in the western Indian Ocean, as well as off Panama and Brazil. It dwells at a depth range of 140 to 243 metres (459 to 797 ft). Males can reach a maximum total length of 19.8 centimetres (7.8 in).
