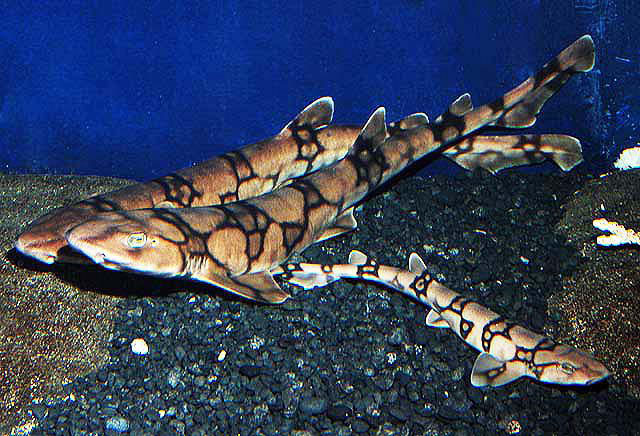

Conservation status
- Least Concern (IUCN 3.1)

Scientific classification
- Kingdom: Animalia
- Phylum: Chordata
- Class: Chondrichthyes
- Subclass: Elasmobranchii
- Division: Selachii
- Order: Carcharhiniformes
- Family: Scyliorhinidae
- Genus: Scyliorhinus
- Species: S. retifer

Binomial name
- Scyliorhinus retifer (Garman, 1881)
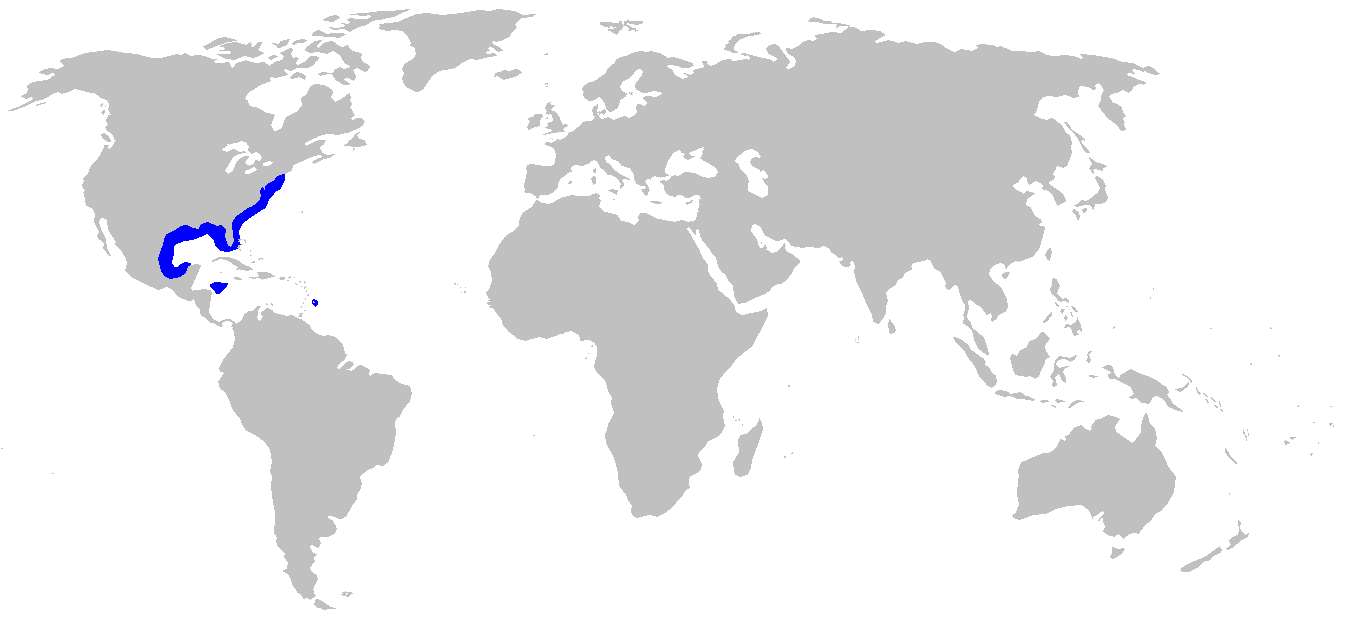
- Range of the chain catshark

Synonyms
- Scyllium retiferum Garman, 1881

= Chain catshark =

Species of shark

The chain catshark or chain dogfish (Scyliorhinus retifer) is a small, reticulated catshark that is biofluorescent. The species is common in the Northwest Atlantic, Gulf of Mexico, and Caribbean. It is harmless and rarely encountered by humans. It has very similar reproductive traits to the small-spotted catshark (S. canicula).

== Distribution ==
The chain catshark is found in the Northwest Atlantic, Gulf of Mexico and Caribbean, ranging from George's Bank in Massachusetts, to Nicaragua and Barbados. In the Mid-Atlantic Bight, the chain catshark is found along the outer continental shelf and upper slope. The shark occupies depths of 36 to 750 meters (118–2,461 ft); in the northern part of its range it is mainly found between 36 and 230 meters (118–755 ft) and in the southern areas generally deeper than 460 meters (1,510 ft). Due to the shark's depth distribution, it has been suggested that the shark does not perform large-scale migrations.

Temperature is thought to limit the shark's distribution in northern areas, particularly during the winter. Although bands of warm water at the edge of the shelf have been observed, the temperature varies seasonally, thus limiting this non-migratory species. In general, the chain catshark is found in waters with a temperature between 8.5 °C (47 °F) and 14 °C (57 °F).

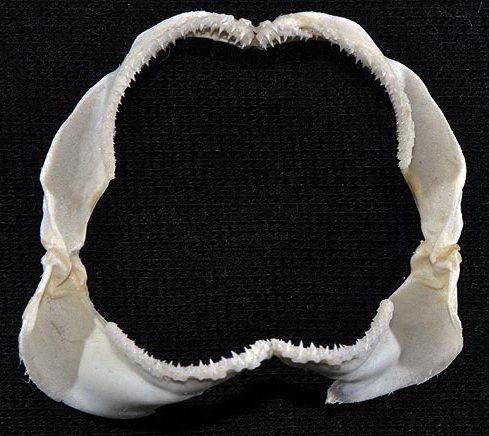
Jaws

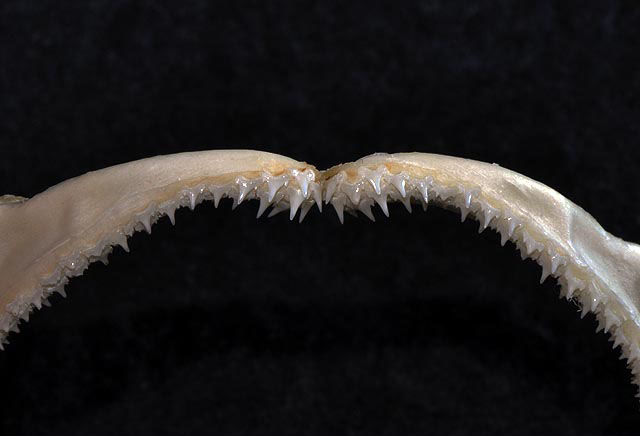
Upper teeth

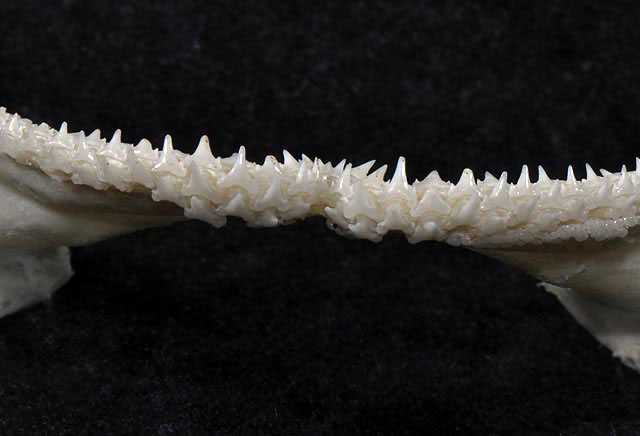
Lower teeth

== Habitat and behavior ==
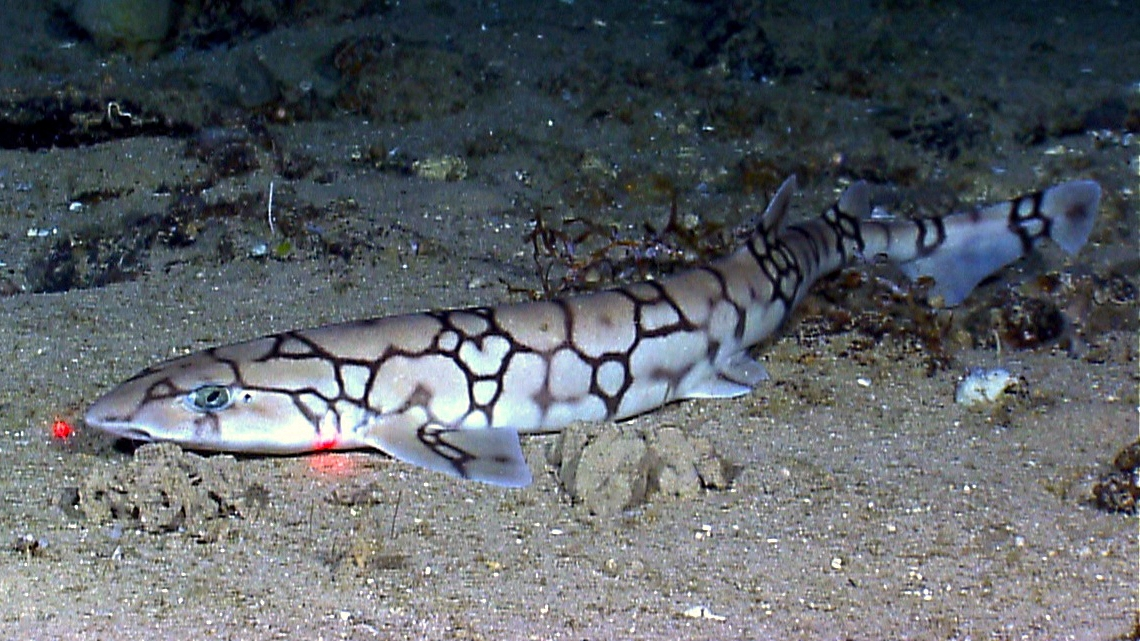
Scyliorhinus retifer resting at the bottom in the Gulf of Mexico

The catshark spends the daytime resting at the bottom, usually in contact with certain structures. It has been observed with large burrowing cerianthid anemone tubes and boulders. The bottom rubble is thought to be used as a camouflage with the shark's spotted surface. Adult sharks tend to prefer rough bottoms, creating a difficulty for trawl sampling, while the immature forms are found near smoother regions. The chain catshark has been known to feed on squid, bony fish, polychaetes and crustaceans. In aquaria, they are relatively motionless, spending the day resting on the bottom, but during the night and when fed they are very active.

== Reproduction ==
=== Size and sexual maturity ===
The maximum length of this shark is 59 centimeters (1.94 ft).

In the female chain catshark, follicle development has been correlated to nidamental gland size, thus, they are considered mature when they have a fully developed nidamental gland or shell gland. This is marked by the gland's growth to 1.8 cm (0.7 in) or more in width. Sexual maturity in the female is seen at 52 centimeters (1.71 ft) in length under normal conditions. There has been evidence however that some northern populations of the shark may mature at a smaller size, at 41 centimeters (1.35 ft). In the male catshark, testis development is correlated to clasper size, thus maturity is marked when it develops hardened claspers that are 3 cm (1.2 in) or more in length. Males reach maturity at a length between 37 and 50 centimeters (1.21–1.64 ft).

=== Mating ===
Observed mating between the species suggests biting plays an element and that mating occurs repeatedly. Behavioral observations include the male biting the female until it can get a firm grasp and subsequently wraps its body around the female for copulation. After copulation, the male releases his bite and both separate.

=== Egg-laying ===
The chain catshark prefers vertical structures for egg deposition and always deposits eggs in pairs. The interval between pairs of eggs ranges from a few minutes to 8 days. Development rates average 1 mm diameter per 7.7 days although temperature has also been seen to affect follicle development.

=== Sperm storage and egg cases ===
The female chain catshark is able to store sperm and lay eggs several days after initial copulation. The shark has been known to store sperm up to 843 days although, there are some circumstances of poor egg development in eggs laid later. It is suggested that this could be due to a number of factors including, senescence, low sperm viability, or water quality factors.

Egg cases found in the oviduct are soft, pale yellow and translucent. They also feature two coiled tendrils, a key adaptation which allows snagging on rocks or man made structures, providing grounding and safety. When deposited, they become hardened and become dark amber with white bands.

Developing Scyliorhinus retifer embryos

=== Embryos ===
Embryos take 8–12 months to develop due to temperature variations in the environment. The catshark lays eggs in their blastodisc form. The following exhibits a typical developmental timeline (measurements are embryo length):

- 10 mm (0.4 in) – it has well-defined gill arches and has a thin ventral finfold
- 21 mm (0.8 in) – dorsal and pelvic fin buds appear
- 33 mm (1.3 in) – embryo has protruding eyes and well-developed gill filaments
- 43 mm (1.7 in) – it has lost its translucency and develops slits in the egg case, allowing fluid exchange from surrounding seawater and the interior
- 58 mm (2.3 in) – the finfold starts to decay
- 66 mm (2.6 in) – the finfold and gill filaments are reduced or absent
- 74 mm (2.9 in) – external appearance is complete but yolk sac is still being absorbed
- 100–110 mm (3.9–4.3 in) – hatching

== Fluorescence ==
The chain catshark is one of four elasmobranch species shown to possesses biofluorescent properties. The researchers of the study examined the vision of Scyliorhinus retifer using microspectrophotometry and designed a "shark-eye" camera that yielded contrast information on areas where fluorescence is anatomically distributed on the shark. The repeated evolution of biofluorescence in elasmobranchs, coupled with a visual adaptation to detect it; and evidence that biofluorescence creates greater luminosity contrast with the surrounding background, highlights the potential importance of biofluorescence in elasmobranch behavior and biology. The key fluorescent pigments in the chain catshark and the swell shark are a set of brominated kynurenine compounds that appear to be synthesized by the kynurenine pathway starting from 6-bromo-tryptophan. The biochemical origin of 6-bromo-tryptophan in these species is not known.

== Relationship with humans ==
The chain catshark is not currently fished for human consumption.

The chain catshark has been described as "gorgeous", and this, combined with its small size, makes it a popular cold-water aquarium fish. It is frequently displayed and bred at public aquariums. Research in shark behavior, including reproduction, has been done in chain catsharks kept in public aquariums or laboratories.
