= Xenoconger =

Conservation status
- Least Concern (IUCN 3.1)

Scientific classification
- Kingdom: Animalia
- Phylum: Chordata
- Class: Actinopterygii
- Order: Anguilliformes
- Family: Chlopsidae
- Genus: Xenoconger; Regan, 1912
- Species: X. fryeri

Binomial name
- Xenoconger fryeri Regan, 1912

Genus of fishes

Xenoconger is a genus of eels in the family Chlopsidae (false morays). It contains the single species Xenoconger fryeri, or Fryer's false moray. This species was described by Charles Tate Regan in 1912. It is a tropical, marine eel which is known solely from Assumption Island in the Indian Ocean and Tokunoshima in the Amami Islands. It is known to dwell at a depth range of 1 to 5 metres (3.3 to 16.4 ft), and inhabit benthic rock crevices. Males are known to reach a total length of 20.5 centimetres (8.1 in). The collector was John Claud Fortescue Fryer.
