= Biofluorescence =

Light emission in lifeforms with external source

A Pachydactylus rangei exhibiting biofluorescence under ultraviolet light

Biofluorescence is fluorescence exhibited by a living organism: part of the organism absorbs light or other radiation at one wavelength and emits visible light at another, usually longer. The absorbed radiation is often blue or ultraviolet, while the light emitted is typically green, red, or anything in between. Biofluorescence requires an external light source and a fluorescent biomolecular substance, which is often one or more proteins, but can consist of other biomolecules.

A perceptible example of fluorescence occurs when the absorbed radiation is ultraviolet, thus invisible to the human eye, while the emitted light is in the visible spectrum; this gives the fluorescent substance a distinct color that can only be seen when it is exposed to UV light.

Since biofluorescence was discovered in Aequorea victoria and the green fluorescent protein structure was resolved, many other organisms have been shown to exhibit biofluorescence and many new fluorescent proteins have been discovered.

== Taxonomic range ==
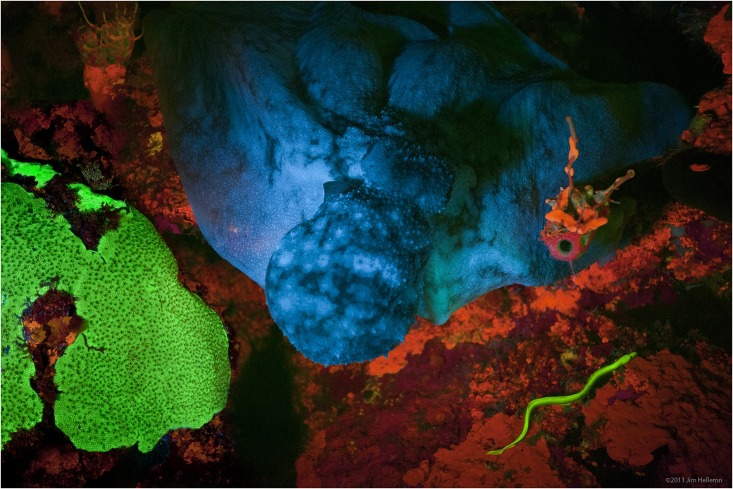
Biofluorescent marine organisms

=== Plants ===
Biofluorescence is frequent in plants, and can occur in many of their parts. The biofluorescence in chlorophyll has been studied since the 1800s. Generally, chlorophyll fluoresces red, and can be used as a measure of photosynthetic capabilities, or general health. After absorbing light, chlorophyll may fluoresce as part of the physiological processes involved in photosynthesis.

Reproductive organs such as pollen, anthers or petals may also fluoresce. These characters may produce a variety of colors depending on the pigment responsible for fluorescence. While it is unclear what the primary function of different kinds of fluorescence are in plants, reproductive characters may biofluoresce as a signal to attract pollinators, However, biofluorescence may also attract prey in predatory plants, or serve no function.

=== Animals ===
While biofluorescence was first discovered and extensively characterized in invertebrates, recent work has observed biofluorescence in many vertebrates, with discoveries of biofluorescence have been made in salamanders and frogs, fish, birds, and mammals.

== Functions ==
The function of biofluorescence in each case is not completely known. The fluorescent signal may play a role in inter- and intraspecific communication, such as camouflage (e.g. corals), attracting mates (e.g. birds and copepods) and symbionts (e.g. corals), or deterring predators.

Other explanations are physiological, with bright color being a side-product of a defense from UV (e.g. the protein sandercyanin, and UV protection of genes in pollen). Bright red fluorescence in the larvae of Acropora millepora coral correlates with the activation of a diapause-like state that may aid in conserving energy and tolerating heat and other stressors during a long dispersal to novel habitats.

== Evolution ==
Most likely biofluorescence arose multiple times by convergent evolution. Reconstruction experiments suggest the original fluorescent protein was green, and had a simple beta-barrel shape with a chromophore hidden inside. Different colors of green fluorescent proteins (GFP), yellow, red, cyan, and amber, are determined by variations in chromophore structure. Red fluorescent proteins chromophore are the most complex and require extra maturation steps. New fluorescent proteins evolved through gene duplication and accumulation of multiple mutations which gradually changed autocatalytic functions and final chromophore structure.

GFP analogs are common, but this is not the only possible structural solution for biofluorescence. In freshwater Japanese eels Anguilla japonica the unique protein UnaG fluoresces by binding bilirubin, a mechanism very distinct from that of green fluorescent protein. UnaG absorbs blue light and emits green only when the complex with bilirubin is formed. This feature makes UnaG attractive for biomedical assays in exploration of bilirubin-dependent cellular processes.

Another non-GFP-like fluorescent protein is a blue protein, sandercyanin, from freshwater fish walleye, Sander vitreus, in the North hemisphere. Sandercyanin is seasonally produced, with production peaking in the late summer, and is thought to be a defense against high UV. Sandercyanin binds biliverdin IXa, and together they form a tetra-homomer which absorbs UV light at 375 nm and emits red light at 675 nm.

Two species of catsharks, Cephaloscyllium ventriosum, endemic to the eastern Pacific, and Scyliorhinus retifer, from the western Atlantic, fluoresce by a different mechanism. The fluorescence is produced by brominated tryptophan-kynurenine metabolites, small aromatic compounds present in the lighter-colored regions of skin on the fish. Dermal features of the shark skin optically enhance the fluorescent signal.

== See also ==
- Bioluminescence
