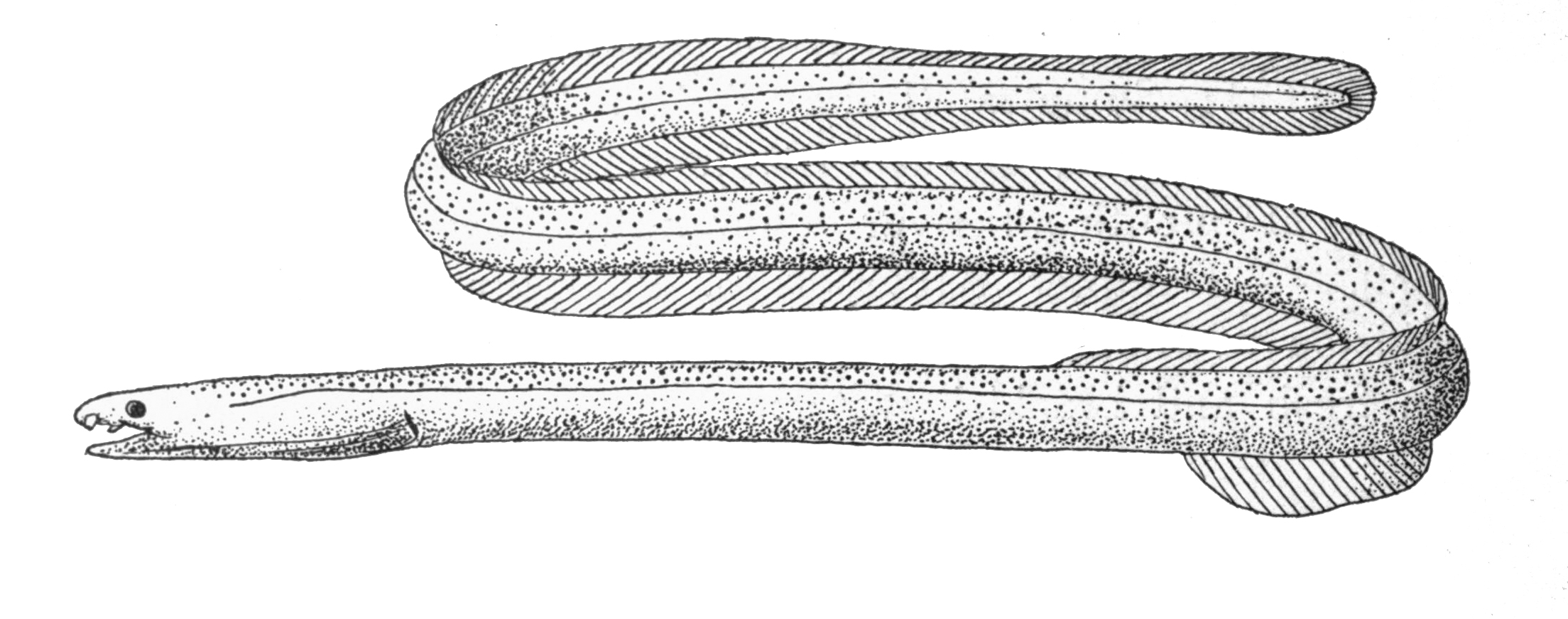
- Muraenichthys gymnopterus

Scientific classification
- Kingdom: Animalia
- Phylum: Chordata
- Class: Actinopterygii
- Division: Teleostei
- Order: Anguilliformes
- Family: Ophichthidae
- Subfamily: Myrophinae
- Genus: Muraenichthys; Bleeker, 1853

Type species
- Muraena gymnopterus Bleeker, 1852

= Muraenichthys =

Genus of fishes

Muraenichthys is a genus of eels in the snake eel family Ophichthidae.

== Species ==
There are currently 8 recognized species in this genus:

- Muraenichthys gymnopterus (Bleeker, 1853)
- Muraenichthys hattae D. S. Jordan & Snyder, 1901
- Muraenichthys malabonensis Herre, 1923
- Muraenichthys philippinensis L. P. Schultz & Woods, 1949 (Philippines worm eel)
- Muraenichthys schultzei Bleeker, 1857 (Maimed worm eel)
- Muraenichthys sibogae M. C. W. Weber & de Beaufort, 1916 (Siboga worm eel)
- Muraenichthys thompsoni D. S. Jordan & R. E. Richardson, 1908 (Thompson's worm eel)
- Muraenichthys velinasalis Hibino & Kimura, 2015 (Curtain-nose worm eel)
