= Chlopsidae =

- Chlopsis bicolor

Scientific classification
- Kingdom: Animalia
- Phylum: Chordata
- Class: Actinopterygii
- Order: Anguilliformes
- Suborder: Chlopsoidei
- Family: Chlopsidae; Rafinesque, 1815

Genera
- See Text

Family of fishes

The Chlopsidae, or false morays, are a family of marine ray-finned fishes belonging to the order Anguilliformes, the eels. The eels in this family are found in coral reefs worldwide. As their name suggests, they somewhat resemble moray eels in appearance. However, they are smaller than true morays, ranging from 11 to 42 cm (4.3 to 16.5 in) in length.

== Taxonomy ==
Chlopsidae was first proposed as a family in 1815 by the French polymath and naturalist Constantine Samuel Rafinesque. The 5th edition of Fishes of the World classifies Chlopsidae in the monotypic suborder Chlopsoidei within the order Anguilliformes.

== Genera ==
Chlopsidae contains the following genera:

- Genus Boehlkenchelys Tighe, 1992
- Genus Catesbya Böhlke & D. G. Smith, 1968
- Genus Chilorhinus Lütken, 1852
- Genus Chlopsis Rafinesque, 1810
- Genus Kaupichthys Schultz, 1943
- Genus Powellichthys J. L. B. Smith, 1966
- Genus Robinsia Böhlke & D. G. Smith, 1967
- Genus Xenoconger Regan, 1912
