= Liesch =

Liesch is a surname. Notable people with the surname include:

- Auguste Liesch (1874–1949), Luxembourgish politician, writer, and civil servant
- Dannielle Liesch (born 1978), Australian synchronized swimmer

== See also ==
- Lesch
- Lisch
