= Loesch =

Loesch or Lösch may refer to:

- Dorothea Maria Lösch (1730–1799), mariner
- Dana Loesch (born 1978), American radio host
- Frank J. Loesch (1852–1944), prominent Chicago attorney, crime fighter
- Harrison Loesch (1916–1997), assistant Secretary of the Interior under Richard Nixon
- Gerrit Lösch (born 1941), minister
- Harold Loesch (1926–2011), marine biologist and oceanographer
- Ingeborg Loesch, sprint canoer
- Juli Loesch (born 1951), activist
- Markus Lösch (born 1971), football player

== See also ==
- Lesh
- Losch
