= Gulf Coast Ecosystem Restoration Task Force =

The Gulf Coast Ecosystem Restoration Task Force is the organization created by President Barack Obama to recover from the 2010 BP Deepwater Horizon oil spill and preserve the ecosystem of the Gulf Coast of the United States.

== Background ==
On April 20, 2010, the United States watched as over 200 million gallons of crude oil flowed into the Gulf of Mexico from the 2010 BP Deepwater Horizon oil spill. For three months various efforts were taken to cap the broken well and were finally successful on September 19, 2010. In the aftermath of this disaster the Federal government of the United States searched for not only who should pay the consequences of this catastrophe, but also, a plan to prevent this type of spill from occurring again. The nation also looked for a way to recover and preserve the ecosystem of the Gulf Coast that was tremendously damaged as a result of the spill. At the recommendation of the United States Secretary of the Navy Ray Mabus, President Obama created the Gulf Coast Ecosystem Restoration Task Force.

=== Executive order ===
Established by executive order under President Barack Obama on October 5, 2010, the Gulf Coast Ecosystem Restoration Task Force exists to "address the damage caused by the BP Deepwater Horizon oil spill, address the longstanding ecological decline, and begin moving toward a more resilient Gulf Coast Ecosystem."

The Task Force will serve to coordinate intergovernmental responsibilities, planning and exchange of information so as to better implement Gulf Coast ecosystem restoration and to facilitate appropriate accountability and support throughout the restoration process. It will consist of senior representatives from the Departments of: Defense, Justice, Interior, Agriculture, Commerce and Transportation, as well as the Environmental Protection Agency, Domestic Policy Council, Council on Environmental Quality, the Office of Management and Budget, and the Office of Science and Technology Policy. Other agencies and five state representatives appointed by President Obama at the recommendation of the Governors of Gulf states will also guide the task force.

==== Functions ====
The functions of the Task Force are listed as follows:

- coordinate intergovernmental efforts to improve efficiency and effectiveness in the implementation of Gulf Coast ecosystem restoration actions;
- support the Natural Resource Damage Assessment process by referring potential ecosystem restoration actions to the Natural Resource Damage Assessment Trustee Council for consideration and facilitating coordination among the relevant departments, agencies, and offices, as appropriate, subject to the independent statutory responsibilities of the trustees;
- present to the President a Gulf of Mexico Regional Ecosystem Restoration Strategy (Strategy) as provided in section 4 of this order;
- engage local stakeholders, communities, the public, and other officials throughout the Gulf Coast region to ensure that they have an opportunity to share their needs and viewpoints to inform the work of the Task Force, including the development of the Strategy;
- provide leadership and coordination of research needs in support of ecosystem restoration planning and decision making in the Gulf Coast region, and work with existing Federal and State advisory committees, as appropriate, to facilitate consideration of relevant scientific and technical knowledge;
- prepare a biennial update for the President on progress toward the goals of Gulf Coast ecosystem restoration, as outlined in the Strategy;
- communicate with affected tribes in a manner consistent with Executive Order 13175 of November 6, 2000, on consultation and coordination with Indian tribal governments;
- and coordinate with relevant executive departments, agencies, and offices on ways to encourage health and economic benefits associated with proposed ecosystem restoration actions.

=== Leadership ===
The chair of the task force is designated by the President as the leadership of the organization to coordinate between the various government agencies, preside over the meetings of the organization, and facilitate the transition from response to restoration following the BP Deepwater Horizon oil spill. The chair also is the leader of communications with the various states, tribes, local governments, and other affected parties from the oil spill. The chair selects the executive director of the task force.

=== Membership ===
- Environmental Protection Agency – Lisa P. Jackson, administrator of the U.S. Environmental Protection Agency, Chair
- Department of the Interior – Will Shafroth, Principal Deputy Assistant Secretary for Fish, Wildlife and Parks
- Department of Commerce – Larry Robinson, Assistant Secretary of Commerce for Conservation and Management
- Department of Defense – Jo-Ellen Darcy, Assistant Secretary of the Army (Civil Works)
- Department of Agriculture – Harris Sherman, Under Secretary for Natural Resources and Environment
- Department of Justice – Ignacia S. Moreno, Assistant Attorney General, Environment and Natural Resource Division
- Department of Transportation – Byron Black, Senior Maritime Safety and Security Advisor
- Office of Management and Budget – Sally Ericsson, associate director for Natural Resources Program
- Council on Environmental Quality – Nancy Sutley
- Office of Science and Technology Policy – Shere Abbott, associate director for Environment
- Domestic Policy Council – Carlos Monje, Senior Advisor
- State of Alabama – N. Gunter Guy, Jr., Commissioner, Alabama Department of Conservation and Natural Resources
- State of Florida – Mimi Drew, Florida Department of Environmental Protection
- State of Louisiana – Garret Graves, Chair of the Coastal Protection and Restoration Authority of Louisiana
- State of Mississippi – Alice Perry, assistant director for the Mississippi Department of Environmental Quality
- State of Texas – Jerry Patterson, Commissioner, Texas General Land Office

== Background on coastal erosion ==
According to the Center for American Progress: "The Gulf region suffers the most coastal land loss of any region in the United States." Louisiana alone, which holds 40 percent of wetlands in the continental United States, loses wetlands equivalent to the area of the size of a football field every half-hour —about 80 percent of all wetland losses. By 2030 the Gulf States risk a total of $350 billion in environmental losses and risk from rising sea level, land subsidence, and hurricane damages if no action is taken to restore the coast.

=== Proposed solution of task force ===
According to Jackson, the top priority of the task force is to develop the "Gulf of Mexico Regional Ecosystem Restoration Strategy" which would set goals for one year to develop performance indicators to track the progress of the organization as well as set up a process for coordinating intergovernmental restoration efforts. This strategy will consider already existing research and efforts like the Mississippi River/Gulf of Mexico Watershed Nutrient Task Force, which focuses on reducing the size of the low-oxygen "dead zone" along the coast of the Gulf of Mexico.

== Recent developments ==
The Gulf Coast Ecosystem Restoration Task Force is chaired by Environmental Protection Agency administrator Lisa Jackson and held a meeting on February 28, 2011, in New Orleans, Louisiana. At the meeting Jackson emphasized the need for restoration to be local stating, "We're counting on the people who know these areas, the people who work these areas, who work these issues, who know what it takes to build a coalition of support around something the Gulf Coast never had." Included in the meeting were Louisiana parish presidents and officials staffing the Deepwater Horizon Response. Among the leadership from Louisiana was chairman of the Louisiana Seafood Promotion and Marketing Board, Harlon Pearce who, along with his colleagues called for no net loss of coastal land and a strategic rebuilding of areas already identified as culturally and economically important by Louisiana's 2012 Master Plan.

=== Meetings ===
- November 8, 2010 - Pensacola, Florida - agenda:
- February 28, 2011 - New Orleans, Louisiana - agenda:
- May 6, 2011 - Mobile, Alabama
- June 27, 2011 - Southeast Texas
- August 29, 2011 - Biloxi, Mississippi

== See also ==
- Environmental impact of the Deepwater Horizon oil spill
