= Lesh =

Lesh (Russian: Леш) is both a surname and a given name. Notable people with the name include:

== As a surname ==
- Fyodor Lesh (1840–1903), Russian physician
- Leonid Lesh (1862–1934), Russian general
- Phil Lesh (1940–2024), American musician
- Richard Lesh, American professor
- Ulysses Samuel Lesh (1868–1965), American politician

== As a given name ==
- Lesh Shkreli (born 1957), Yugoslav footballer

== See also ==
- Lesch, a surname
- Loesch
- Losch
- LESH
- Phil Lesh and Friends
- Lezhë
