= Mississippi River Watershed Conservation Programs =

Environmental program in the United States

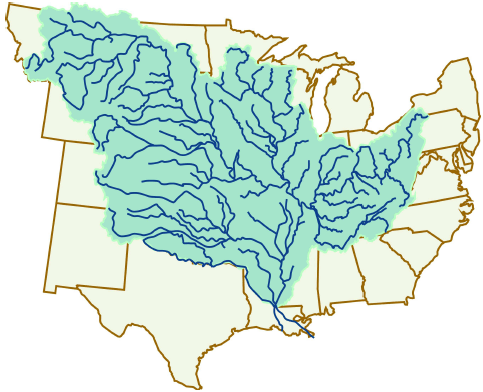
Mississippi River Watershed

Conservation programs for the Mississippi River watershed have been designed to protect and preserve it by implementing practices that decrease the harmful effects of development on habitats and to overlook monitoring that helps future planning and management. A main focus is nutrient pollution from agricultural runoff of the nation's soybean, corn and food animal production, and problems relating to sediment and toxins. Conservation programs work with local farmers and producers to decrease excess nutrients because they cause major water quality problems along with hypoxia and loss of habitat. Organizations such as the Mississippi River/Gulf of Mexico Watershed Nutrient Task Force and USDA programs such as the Upper Mississippi River Forestry Partnership and the Mississippi River Basin Healthy Watersheds Initiative contribute to conserving what is left of the Mississippi River watershed.

== Conservation of the Mississippi River ==
Conservation of the Mississippi River Watershed has become an important issue that many organizations are undertaking because the capacity of the river to remove nutrients from the water is decreasing and the surrounding ecosystems are being diminished. The Mississippi River Basin encompasses 31 U.S. states with an area of 1,837,000 square miles. The Mississippi River's capacity to remove nutrients has diminished due to a range of human activities, such as development, taking place along the Mississippi River itself and the streams and tributaries linked to it. The layouts of the river, the floodplains, and the watershed have also been modified using engineering techniques for acres of agriculture fields and urban expansion. With increase of natural prairie land being converted to land for agricultural and urban use, there has been an excess of nutrients that are discharged into the Mississippi River and its adjoining streams. Nitrates and Phosphorus are the two main contaminants that pollute the Mississippi River Watershed. This nutrient pollution comes from a surplus of phosphorus and nitrogen, both of which occur naturally in water and air. In the Upper Mississippi River Basin farmland, nitrate fertilizer has been overused in farming, with the high demand for corn as a contributing factor. Corn, which is used to make ethanol for biofuel, has become the number one crop in the farmland that drains into the Mississippi River. Soybeans are another crop in the Upper Mississippi River Basin farmland that drain into the watershed, and nitrates are the main fertilizer used on soybeans and corn.

A variety of changes are needed in the agriculture industry to reduce the pollution from over fertilizing. One solution for nitrate reduction is to plant an alternative crop through crop rotation, such as legumes. Legumes are capable of nitrate fixation, which causes the plant to have a reduced need for nitrate fertilizer. Nitrate drainage is then reduced going into the watershed because legumes do not require the high amounts of fertilizer that are needed for corn and soybeans. Other alternative plants that can be used in crop rotation are miscanthus and switchgrass. These crops effectively reduce the flow of nitrates going into the Mississippi River Basin.

Conservation practices can be used as alternative crops to reduce phosphorus and nitrate pollution in the River. They are necessary since nutrient pollution affects humans and aquatic life in the waterways leading to the Watershed along with the coast. The Gulf of Mexico receives the greatest damage from the pollution. Normal algae growth in water is needed to provide food for fish and other water organisms, but algae can grow too quickly because of the excess nitrogen and phosphorus going into the Mississippi River Basin. The overgrowth produces an algae or algal bloom, which reduces the amount of oxygen in the water. The depleted oxygen levels kill the aquatic life in the Gulf of Mexico, and it can make fish and other aquatic life sick. The depleted oxygen levels kill the aquatic life in the Gulf of Mexico, and it can make fish and other aquatic life sick. Humans can be affected if they drink water or consume fish and other aquatic life that have been contaminated with bacteria or other toxic substances from the algae blooms. Shellfish contamination from the algae occurs easily, and it can be very dangerous for human consumption and cause stomach issues and rashes.

Millions of people throughout the United States have a water source connected to the Mississippi River Watershed because the basin is connected to groundwater, well water, and other water supply tributaries throughout the country. The watershed also serves as largest drainage system in the country. Drinking water from the basin that is polluted by nitrates and phosphorus can cause serious injury to anyone who consumes it, especially young infants. The chemicals that are used to treat the polluted water are very dangerous. These chemicals cannot be avoided since there are no real alternatives to treat the polluted water. The contaminated water source also harms forests that are located in the basin, and animals can be affected if they consume water or plants that have been contaminated by the nutrient pollution. Nitrates and phosphorus also pollute the air, and if the air is polluted, eventually the contamination will fall back to the earth and the waterway making its way through the basin.

=== Mississippi River/Gulf of Mexico Watershed Nutrient Task Force ===
The Mississippi River/Gulf of Mexico Watershed Nutrient Task Force undertakes the challenge of eliminating the dead zone in the Gulf of Mexico as well as promoting the implementation of new farming practices and nutrient runoff management. The Mississippi River dumps high nutrient runoff from the vast drainage basin into the Gulf of Mexico causing an outbreak of algae growth. The excess algae create an area where the dissolved oxygen concentration is very low in the bottom waters. Many organisms cannot tolerate low-oxygen levels and either leave the area or become weakened or die from lack of oxygen. A majority of the nutrient loadings originate from the draining of agricultural lands north of the Ohio River in the states of Iowa, Illinois, Indiana, southern Minnesota, and Ohio. Nitrates and Phosphorus are the two main contaminants that pollute the Mississippi River Watershed. This nutrient pollution comes from a surplus of phosphorus and nitrogen, both of which occur naturally in water and air.

==== 2001 Action Plan ====
The 2001 Action Plan is a national strategy to reduce Gulf hypoxia with a focus on reducing the nitrogen and phosphorus nutrient loads to the northern Gulf coming from the Mississippi River. The Action Plan proposes three goals: a Coastal Goal, a Within Basin Goal, and a Quality of Life Goal. The Coastal Goal intends to reduce the square mileage of hypoxia in the Gulf to 5,000 square kilometers by the implementation of actions to reduce the discharge of nutrients into the Gulf. The Within Basin Goal is to restore and protect the waters of the Mississippi River Basin by implementing nutrient and sedimentation reduction actions that will protect human health and aquatic organisms and reduce the nutrient load released into the Gulf. Lastly, the Quality of Life Goal is to improve communities across the Mississippi River Basin through land management and an incentive based approach. The Action Plan states that by December 2005, and every five years thereafter, the Task Force will review the reductions in nutrient load discharge and the response of the dead zone in the Gulf. From this data, the Task Force would then decide what actions to take to continue achieving the goals.

==== 2008 Action Plan ====
The 2008 Action Plan further describes a national strategy to address the problem with hypoxia in the Gulf of Mexico and also improve the water quality in the Mississippi River. The 2008 Action Plan was a reassessment called for in the 2001 Action Plan. The 2008 Action Plan outlines the significance of completing and implementing nutrient reduction strategies, promoting these practices, and also increasing the awareness of the public of hypoxia in the Gulf. Included in the 2008 Action Plan is a series of five Annual Operating Plans, one for each of the upcoming years until the next reassessment is necessary. These Operating Plans offer guidelines to keep the forward movement of completing Action Plan goals within those years. The 2008 Action plan also summarized the progress of the 2001 Action Plan up until that point. Although the goal of reducing the size of the hypoxia area to 5000 square kilometers was not met, the loadings of nitrogen from the Mississippi River were decreased by 12%.

=== Upper Mississippi River Initiatives ===
==== Upper Mississippi River Forestry Partnership ====
The USDA Forest Service and Northeastern Area State and Private Forestry and other local state foresters have created a partnership to demonstrate forestry's role in restoring the Upper Mississippi River Watershed. Forests are critical in protecting the surrounding watershed and the water quality. Nearly all of the prairies and 70% of the forests in the Upper Mississippi Watershed have been converted to land for agricultural and urban use. The mismanagement has had major effects on fish, wildlife and their habitat, local water supplies, and contributes to nitrogen loading in the Gulf of Mexico.

The Upper Mississippi Watershed Forestry Partnership came up with a 2004-2008 Action Plan proposing to use forests and trees to lessen the impact of the altered landscapes of the Mississippi River watershed. Due to the existing damage and the cost of technological solutions, they suggest to use ecosystem services of woodlands and forest habitats to filter nutrients which helps maintain or improve water quality. They suggest using incentives to create wetlands and forest buffers between farmland and nearby rivers and streams

=== Mississippi River Basin Healthy Watersheds Initiative ===
The Mississippi River Basin Healthy Watersheds Initiative (MRBI) was developed by the United States Department of Agriculture (USDA) Natural Resources Conservation Service (NRCS) in an attempt to improve the health of the Mississippi River Basin. The Initiative has selected watersheds to improve in 12 states including Arkansas, Kentucky, Illinois, Indiana, Iowa, Louisiana, Minnesota, Mississippi, Missouri, Ohio, Tennessee, and Wisconsin. South Dakota was added later. The MRBI built upon past efforts of producers, NRCS, partners, and State and federal agencies in this area. By dedicating $80 million per year from 2010 to 2013, the Initiative introduced local producers in the Mississippi River Watershed to conservation practices to control nutrient runoff from agricultural land. These practices helped to reduce nutrient loadings downstream, improve water quality, and restore habitats while maintaining agricultural productivity. Each state selected three area watersheds that the MRBI focused on. The selection was based on the future growth of the site depending on current water quality data, existing strategies to reduce nutrient discharge, and existing models of nitrogen and phosphorus in the watershed. Special consideration were given to watersheds that had the largest impact on managing nutrients.

==== Approved MRBI Conservation Practices ====
The selected watersheds have to implement a system of practices that address nitrogen and phosphorus generation. MRBI approved practices help avoid, trap, and control nutrients from agricultural runoff. Multiple core and supporting conservation practices provide options for producers depending on their location and existing operations. Approved core practices were selected based on what proved to be most important in reducing the downstream loading of nutrients. Core practices include planting cover crops, constructing grassed waterways or riparian forest buffers, and wetland creation or enhancement. The NRCS allowed State Conservationists to choose supporting practices that address the primary water concerns that have developed within that particular state. Supporting practices include pasture and hayland planting, deep tillage in fields, field borders, and constructing a water and sediment control basin. Payment is received as the implementation of core and supporting practices proceed in a selected watershed.
