= Microbiology of oxygen minimum zones =

Alternative respiratory strategies in hypoxic waters

An oxygen minimum zone (OMZ) is characterized as an oxygen-deficient layer in the world's oceans. Typically found between 200 m to 1500 m deep below regions of high productivity, such as the western coasts of continents. OMZs can be seasonal following the spring-summer upwelling season. Upwelling of nutrient-rich water leads to high productivity and labile organic matter, that is respired by heterotrophs as it sinks down the water column. High respiration rates deplete the oxygen in the water column to concentrations of 2 mg/L or less forming the OMZ. OMZs are expanding, with increasing ocean deoxygenation. Under these oxygen-starved conditions, energy is diverted from higher trophic levels to microbial communities that have evolved to use other biogeochemical species instead of oxygen, these species include nitrate, nitrite, sulphate etc. Several Bacteria and Archea have adapted to live in these environments by using these alternate chemical species and thrive. The most abundant phyla in OMZs are Pseudomonadota, Bacteroidota, Actinomycetota, and Planctomycetota.

In the absence of oxygen, microbes use other chemical species to carry out respiration, in the order of the electrochemical series. With nitrate and nitrite reduction yielding as much energy as oxygen respiration, followed by manganese and iodate respiration and yielding the least amount of energy at the bottom of the series are the iron and sulfate reducers. The utilization of these chemical species by microbes plays an important role in their biogeochemical cycling in the world's oceans.

== Life in anoxic conditions ==
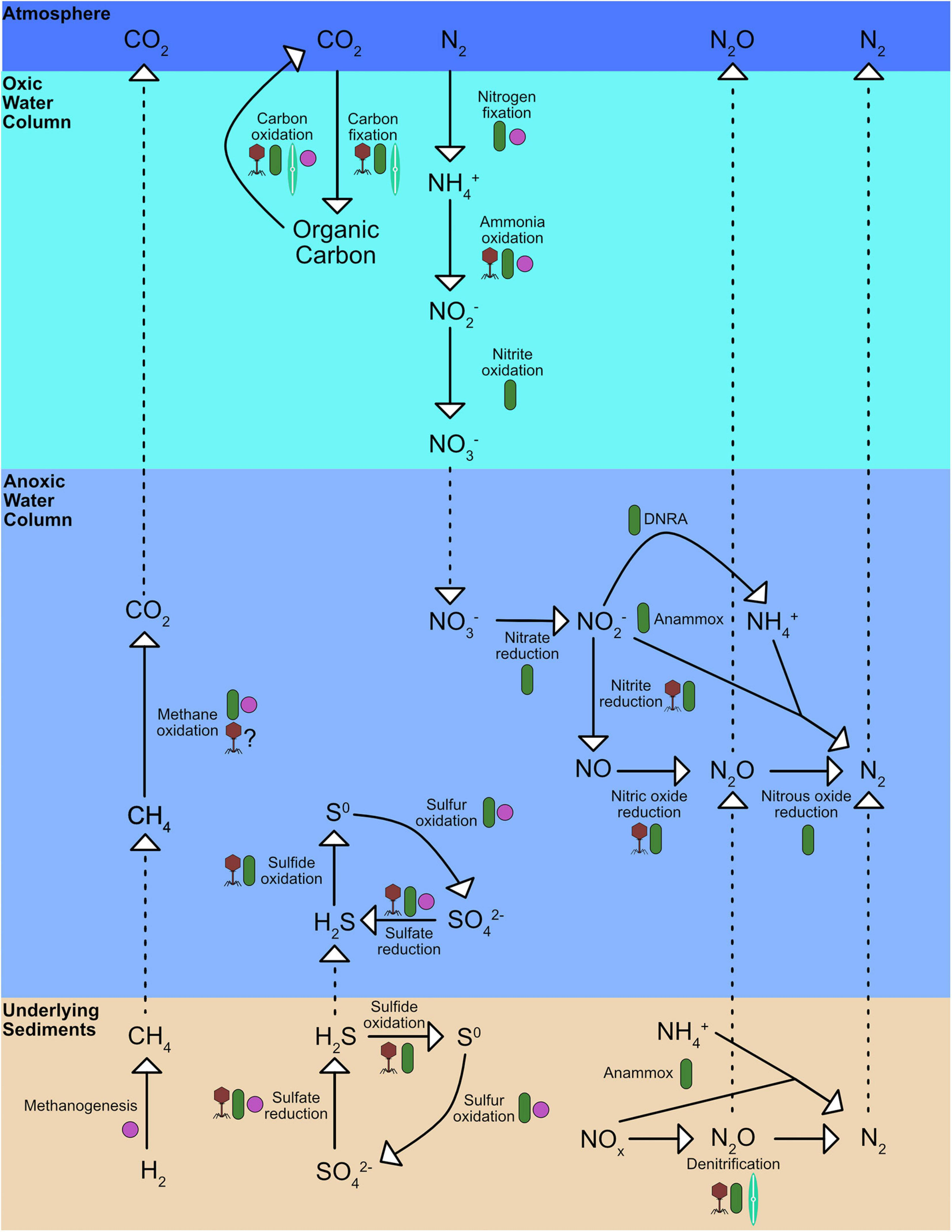
The nutrient cycles in and around the oxygen minimum zone

=== Nitrogen cycling ===
Biological productivity (photosynthesis) in marine ecosystems is often limited by the bioavailability of nitrogen. The amount of bioavailable nitrogen (nitrate (NO_{3}^{−}), nitrite (NO_{2}^{−}), and ammonium (NH_{4}^{+})) depends on the inputs from nitrogen fixation and losses from denitrification and anammox as dinitrogen gas (N_{2}), a compound only accessible to nitrogen-fixing bacteria. N_{2} production from denitrification and anammox closes the nitrogen cycle by reducing the nitrogen available in organic matter fixed by phytoplankton at the surface ocean. Denitrification in OMZs leads to a significant loss of inorganic nitrogen from the oceans, limiting growth/productivity in many regions worldwide. OMZs play a key role in the global nitrogen cycle. As no oxygen is present to fuel aerobic respiration, anoxic systems are primarily dominated by microbially-mediated nitrogen cycling.

N_{2} fixation is performed by diazotrophs (N_{2} fixing bacteria and archaea), which convert N_{2} gas into ammonia (NH_{3}). The amount of N_{2} fixation and the distribution of diazotrophs in the ocean is determined by the availability of oxygen (O_{2}), light, phosphorus (P), iron (Fe), and organic matter, as well as habitat temperature. N_{2} fixation has been found in some anoxic systems, generally associated with sulfate reducers or oxidizers. However, heterotrophic denitrification is a more dominant process under anoxic conditions. Denitrification is the reduction of NO_{3}^{−} and NO_{2}^{−} to the gaseous form of nitrogen (N_{2}), including the greenhouse gas nitrous oxide (N_{2}O). Heterotrophic denitrification is a multi-step process that uses organic matter to reduce NO_{3}^{−} to N_{2} in oxygen-depleted environments like OMZs and sediments. In OMZs, different steps in the denitrification processes are performed by separate groups of bacteria, and these denitrifiers are often found directly on sinking organic matter particles, which are hotspots of microbial activity. The first step of denitrification is nitrate reduction where NO_{3}^{−} is reduced to NO_{2}^{−} by the protein nitrate reductase. Anaerobic ammonia-oxidizing bacteria (anammox) convert NO_{2}^{−} and NH_{4}^{+} to N_{2} using an enzyme called hydrazine oxidoreductase. Genomic studies conducted in these ecosystems reveal a growing abundance of genes encoding proteins responsible for dissimilatory nitrate reduction to ammonium (DNRA) and anammox at the core of these OMZs. Such studies provide information to map out the nitrogen cycle and demystify missing links and unexplored pathways in the water column. Anammox is often coupled to denitrification as a source of NH_{4}^{+} in OMZs or to DNRA in sediments. DNRA has been found to be the dominant process supplying NH_{4}^{+} near the shelf and upper slope of sediments because of the presence of large bacterial mats made up of the giant sulfur-oxidizing bacteria Thioploca spp. and Beggiatoa spp. which reduce NO_{3}^{−} and/or NO_{2}^{−} to NH_{4}^{+} using reduced sulfur. Denitrification and anammox account for about 30-50% of the N-losses in OMZs, where the total N-loss is determined by the supply of sinking organic matter available.

Additionally, ammonium and nitrite oxidation are key processes in N cycling in anoxic environments. Ammonium oxidation is the first step in nitrification and ammonia-oxidizing bacteria (AOB) converts NH_{3} to NO_{2}^{−}. Followed by nitrite oxidation by nitrite-oxidizing bacteria (NOB), which converts NO_{2}^{−} to NO_{3}^{−}. Ammonium and nitrite oxidizers have a high affinity for O_{2} and can use nanomolar concentrations of O_{2} to oxidize ammonium and nitrite. These small concentrations of O_{2} can be supplied by photosynthesis by Prochlorococcus spp. or by horizontal mixing by jets and eddies. In anoxic environments, the competition between ammonium and nitrite oxidization and anammox and denitrification for ammonium and nitrite play an important role in controlling nitrogen loss in OMZs.

==== Sources of ammonium for anammox bacteria ====
Anaerobic ammonium oxidation with nitrite (anammox) is a major pathway of fixed nitrogen removal in the anoxic zones of the open ocean. Anammox requires a source of ammonium, which under anoxic conditions could be supplied by the breakdown of sinking organic matter via heterotrophic denitrification. However, at many locations where anammox is observed, denitrification rates are low or undetectable. Alternative sources of NH_{4}^{+} than denitrification, such as the DNRA, the diffusion and advection from sulfate-reducing sediments, or from microaerobic remineralization at the boundaries of anoxic waters, can supply NH_{4}^{+} to anammox bacterial communities, even though it is not yet clear how much they can influence the process. Another source of NH_{4}^{+}, which plays an important role in the N cycle of OMZs by contributing to the decoupling of anammox and denitrification, is the excretion of NH_{4}^{+} by diel vertically migrating animals. To escape predation, diel vertical migration (DVM) of zooplankton and micronekton can reach the anoxic layers of the major OMZs of the open ocean, and because animals excrete reduced N mostly as NH_{4}^{+}, they can fuel anammox directly and decouple it from denitrification. The downward export of organic matter by migrating zooplankton and micronekton is generally smaller than that of particles at the base of the euphotic zone. However, sinking particles are rapidly consumed with depth, and the active transport by migrators can exceed particle remineralization in deeper layers where animals congregate during the daytime. As a result, inside anoxic waters, the excretion of NH_{4}^{+} by vertically migrating animals could alter the balance between fixed N removal pathways, decoupling anammox and denitrification and enhancing anammox above the values predicted by typical stoichiometry.

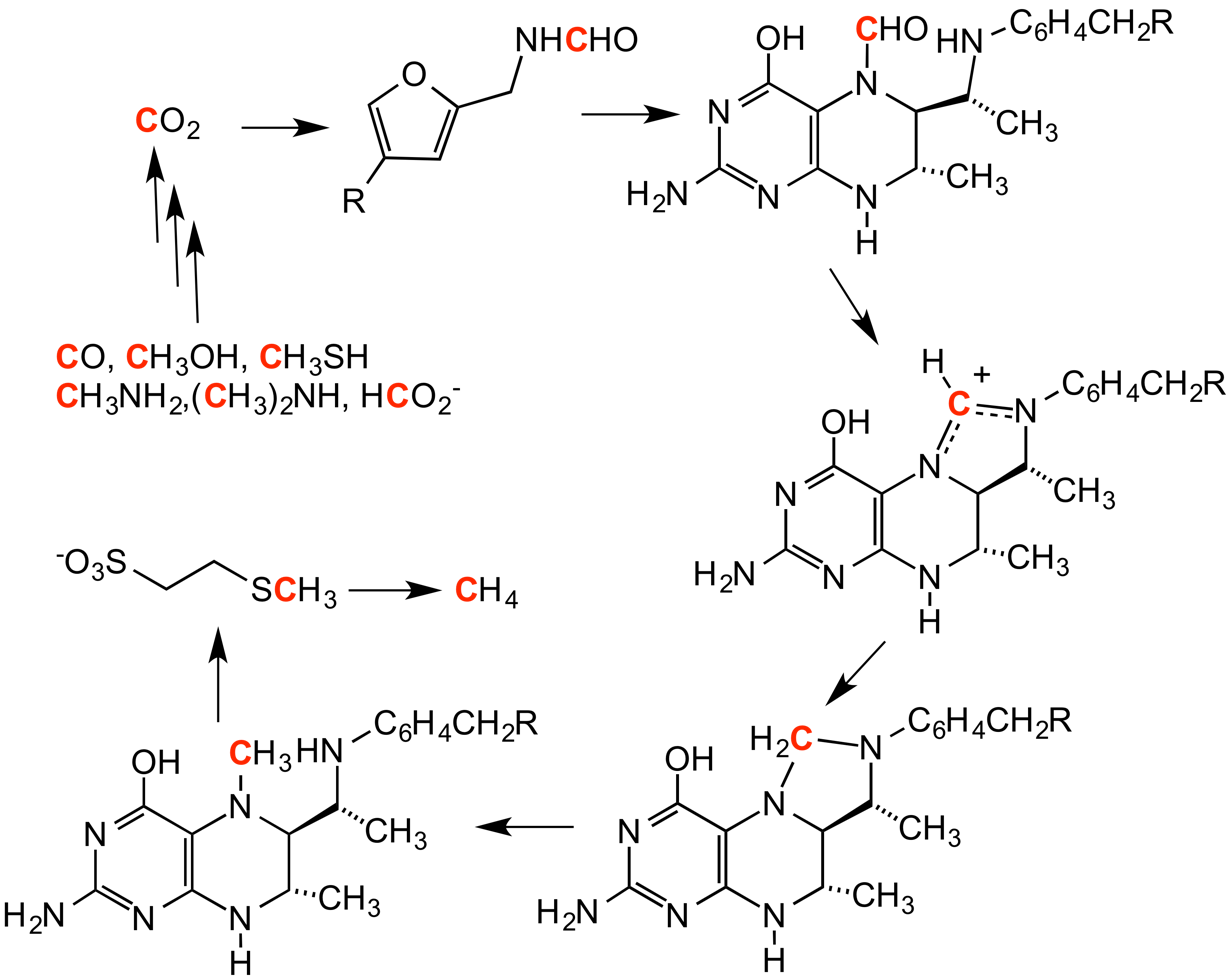
Methanogenesis cycle with intermediates

=== Methanogenesis ===
Sulfate reduction pathway

Methanogenesis is the process by which methanogen microbes form methane (CH_{4}). OMZs are known to contain the largest amount of methane in the open ocean. Methanogens can also oxidize methane as they have the genes to do so, however this requires oxygen which they obtain from photosynthetic organisms in the upper anoxic zone. Ciliates may also aid methanogens through symbiosis to help facilitate methanogenesis. As ciliates have hydrogenosomes, which release hydrogen molecules under low oxygen conditions, they have the ability to host endosymbiotic methanogens.

=== Sulfate reduction ===
Sulfate reduction, which is carried out by sulfate-reducing microorganisms, is a key process in the cryptic sulfur cycle. This cycle involves the successive oxidation of sulfide and reduction of sulfate, using sulfate as a terminal electron acceptor rather than oxygen. The cryptic sulfur cycle was proposed to contribute to energy flow in the anoxic waters off the coast of Chile.

=== Aerobic microbial respiration ===
Aerobic organisms require oxygen to survive and as oxygen becomes limited in OMZs bacteria begin to use other molecules to oxidize organic matter such as nitrate. Aerobic respiration in OMZs helps remineralize organic matter and is a major source of ammonium for most of the upper oxygen minimal zones. It was also found that bacteria from OMZs use a 1/6 of the oxygen for respiration compared bacteria in normal waters.

== Changes due to climate change ==
While oxygen minimum zones (OMZs) occur naturally, they can be exacerbated by human impacts like climate change and land-based pollution from agriculture and sewage. The prediction of current climate models and climate change scenarios is that substantial warming and loss of oxygen throughout the majority of the upper ocean will occur. Global warming increases ocean temperatures, especially in shallow coastal areas. As water temperature increases, its ability to hold oxygen decreases, resulting in lower oxygen concentrations. This compounds the effects of eutrophication in coastal zones described above.

Open ocean areas with no oxygen have grown more than 1.7 million square miles in the last 50 years, and coastal waters have seen a tenfold increase in low-oxygen areas in the same time.

Measurements of dissolved oxygen in coastal and open-ocean waters over the past 50 years have revealed a marked decline in oxygen content. This decline is associated with expanding spatial extent, expanding vertical extent, and prolonged duration of oxygen-poor conditions in all regions of the global oceans. Examinations of the spatial extent of OMZs in the past through paleoceanographical methods clearly show that the spatial extent of OMZs has expanded through time, and this expansion is coupled to ocean warming and reduced ventilation of thermocline waters.

Research has sought to model potential changes to OMZs driven by rising global temperatures and human impacts. This is challenging due to the many factors that could contribute to changes in OMZs. The factors used for modeling change in OMZs are numerous, and in some cases hard to measure or quantify. Some of the processes being studied are changes in oxygen gas solubility as a result of rising ocean temperatures, as well as changes in the amount of respiration and photosynthesis occurring around OMZs. Many studies have concluded that OMZs are expanding in multiple locations, but fluctuations of modern OMZs are still not fully understood. Existing Earth system models project considerable reductions in oxygen and other physical-chemical variables in the ocean due to climate change, with potential ramifications for ecosystems and humans.

The global decrease in oceanic oxygen content is statistically significant and emerging beyond the envelope of natural fluctuations. This trend of oxygen loss is accelerating, with widespread and obvious losses occurring after the 1980s. The rate and total content of oxygen loss varies by region, with the North Pacific emerging as a particular hotspot of deoxygenation due to the increased amount of time since its deep waters were last ventilated (see thermohaline circulation) and related high apparent oxygen utilization (AOU). Estimates of total oxygen loss in the global ocean range from 119 to 680 T mol decade^{−1} since the 1950s. These estimates represent 2% of the global ocean oxygen inventory.

Melting of gas hydrates in the bottom layers of water may result in the release of more methane from sediments and subsequent consumption of oxygen by aerobic respiration of methane to carbon dioxide. Another effect of climate change on oceans that causes ocean deoxygenation is circulation changes. As the ocean warms from the surface, stratification is expected to increase, slowing ocean circulation and further deoxygenating the ocean.

== See also ==
- Ocean deoxygenation
- Anoxic event
- Anoxic waters
- Dead zone (ecology)
- Ocean acidification
