= Losch =

Losch or Lösch is a surname which may refer to:

- Abe Losch, a pseudonym of Harry J. Lincoln (1878-1937), American music composer
- August Lösch (1906–1945), German economist
- Claudia Losch (born 1960), retired shot putter who competed for West Germany
- Claudia Lösch (born 1988), Austrian Paralympian and alpine monoskier
- Dorothea Maria Lösch (1730–1799), Swedish master mariner, first woman Kapten in the Swedish Navy
- Fyodor Lesh (1840-1903), also spelled Lösch, Russian physician
- Gerrit Lösch, member of the Governing Body of Jehovah's Witnesses
- Hartmut Losch (1943-1997), discus thrower who competed for East Germany
- Helmut Losch (1947-2005), retired weightlifter who competed for East Germany
- Jack Losch (1934-2004), American Little League Baseball player, National Football League player, US Air Force fighter pilot and businessman
- Markus Lösch (born 1971), German retired footballer
- Mario Lösch (born 1989), Austrian footballer
- Tilly Losch, professional name of Ottilie Ethel Leopoldine Herbert, Countess of Carnarvon (1903-1975), Austrian-born dancer, choreographer, actress and painter

== See also ==
- Loesch, another surname
