= Oberpullendorf =

Oberpullendorf Felsőpulya
- Municipality
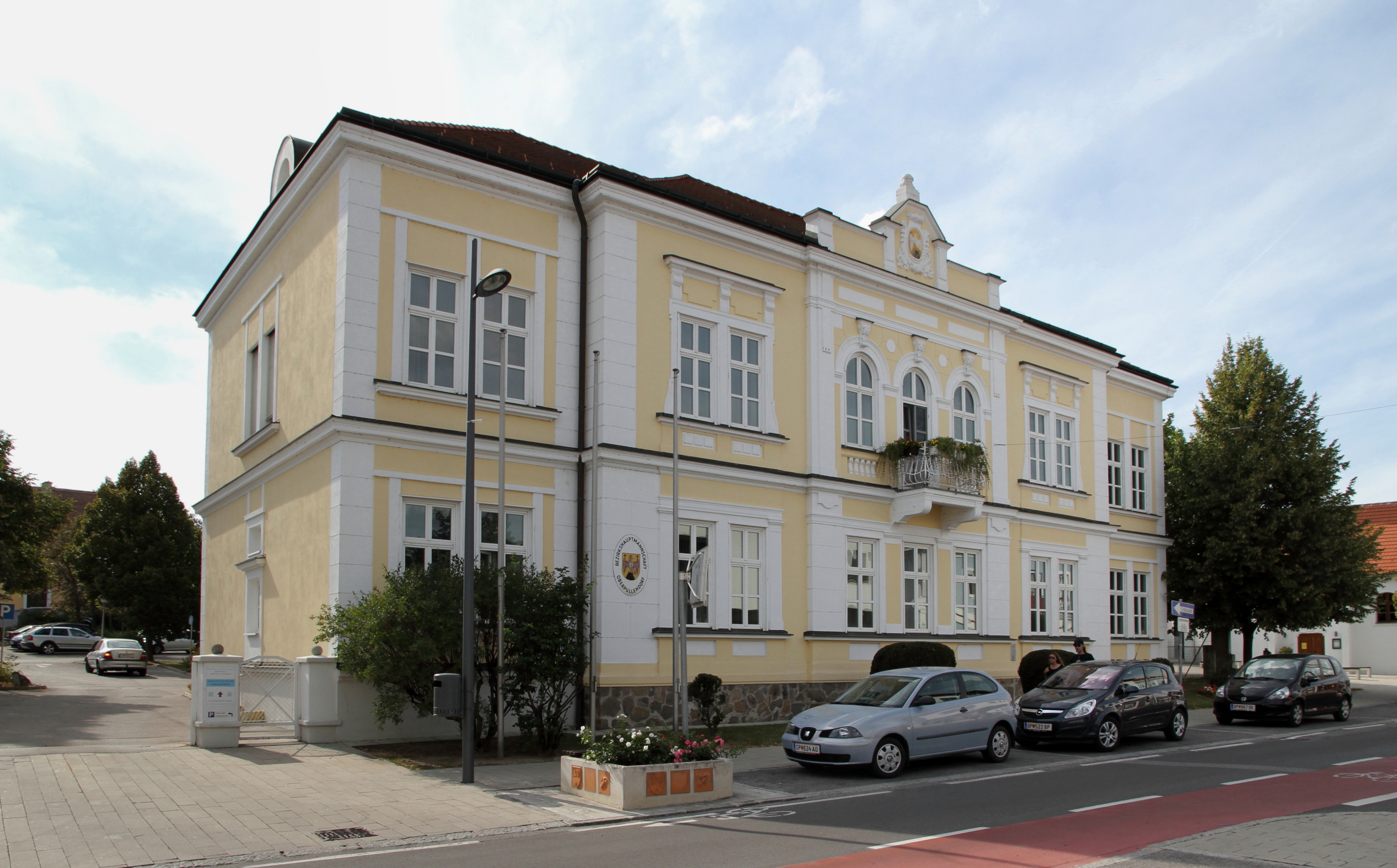
- Seat of the Oberpullendorf district

- Coat of arms

- Location within Austria
- Coordinates: 47°30′N 16°31′E
- Country: Austria
- State: Burgenland
- District: Oberpullendorf

Government
  - Mayor: Johann Heisz (ÖVP)

Area
  - Total: 12.65 km^{2} (4.88 sq mi)
- Elevation: 243 m (797 ft)

Population (2018-01-01)
  - Total: 3,188
  - Density: 252.0/km^{2} (652.7/sq mi)
- Time zone: UTC+1 (CET)
  - Summer (DST): UTC+2 (CEST)
- Postal code: 7350
- Website: http://www.oberpullendorf.at/home/

Oberpullendorf (German pronunciation: [ˌoːbɐˈpʊləndɔʁf]; Croatian: Gornja Pulja or Zgornja Pulja; Hungarian: Felsőpulya) is a town in Burgenland, Austria. It is the administrative center of the district of Oberpullendorf.

== Geography ==
Oberpullendorf is a municipality in the middle of the Burgenland. It consists of two united communities: Mitterpullendorf and Oberpullendorf, and is also the capital of the same called administrative district of Oberpullendorf.

It is surrounded by the communities of Stoob to the north, Großwarasdorf to the east, Frankenau-Unterpullendorf to the south, and Steinberg-Dörfl to the west.

The Stooberbach crosses the municipality from north-west to the south-east.

== History ==
The district of Oberpullendorf has been populated since the Neolithic age. During the early Iron Age the district was a flourishing iron industrial area.

Josef Polatschek, a gardener and regional researcher, mapped several ancient iron extraction sites in the district.

Oberpullendorf was firstly documented in 1225 as a Hungarian frontier guard settlement.

Traditionally Oberpullendorf was the seat of several noble families, among them the Counts Cseszneky de Milvány and the Barons Rohonczy de Felsőpulya.

In 1853 Oberpullendorf became the location of a Hungarian revenue authority.

After the demise of the Austrian-Hungarian monarchy in 1918, the German-speaking inhabitants of Deutsch-Westungarn ("German Western Hungary", later Burgenland) - Oberpullendorf being part of it - intended to join the "new" state of Austria. Back then, Oberpullendorf was part of Sopron County, Hungary. The decision about Deutsch-Westungarn was fixed in the peace treaties of Saint Germain and Trianon. Despite diplomatic efforts by Hungary, the victorious parties of World War I set the date of Burgenland's official unification with Austria as August 28, 1921. (Also see: Burgenland)

In 1958 the two communities of Ober- and Mitterpullendorf were consolidated and since 1975 Oberpullendorf is a municipality.

== Coat of arms ==
On a red shield a golden city wall with an open portcullis can be seen. Above that, a golden lion facing to the right is holding a golden sword and in the background a golden ploughshare is situated, which is accompanied by two golden ears of corn.

== Politics ==
Johann Heisz, a member of the Austrian People's Party (ÖVP), is the mayor of the town.

The parish council consists of 23 mandates - of which the ÖVP (Austrian People's Party) is holding 13 mandates and the SPÖ (Social Democratic Party) has 10 mandates. (2022)

== Culture and sights ==
• Haus St. Stephan - the former castle of the Rohonczy family

• Franziskuskirche (Church of St. Francis) - built in 1707, making it the oldest building in Oberpullendorf

== Notable residents ==
- György Cseszneky (16th century), count, benefactor
- Paul Kiss (born 1947), politician
- Sándor Kozina (1808–1873), painter
- Elisabeth Kulman (born 1973), singer
- Mario Lösch (born 1989), professional footballer
- György Rohonczy (1837–1914), field marshal
- Horst Steiger (1970–1995), football player
- Jutta Treiber (born 1949), writer
- Miriam Ziegler (born 1994), figure skater
