= Mobile Bay jubilee =

Natural phenomenon that occurs in Mobile Bay, Alabama, United States

Coordinates: 30.57°N 87.926°W

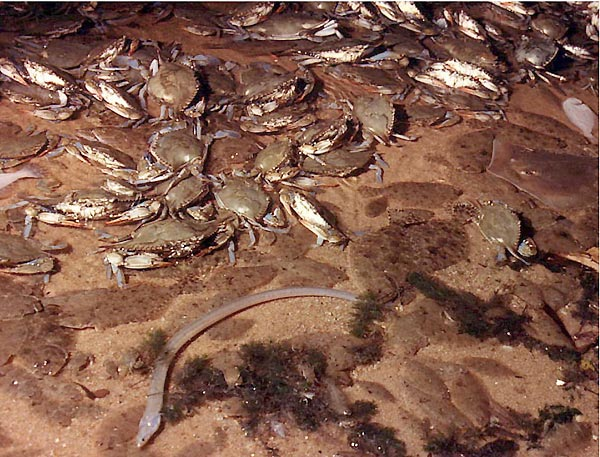
A Jubilee event at Weeks Bay National Estuary Research Reserve showing the macroorganic density typical of the event. Pictured here are crabs, flounder, stingray, and an eel.

Jubilee is the name used locally for a natural phenomenon that occurs sporadically on the shores of Mobile Bay, a large body of water on Alabama's Gulf Coast. During a jubilee many species of crab and shrimp, as well as flounder, eels, and other demersal fish will leave deeper waters and swarm—in large numbers and very high density—in a specific, shallower coastal area of the bay. A jubilee is a celebrated event in Mobile Bay, and it attracts large crowds, many drawn by the promise of abundant and easy-to-catch seafood.

Although similar events have been reported in other bodies of water, Mobile Bay is the only place where the regular appearance of this phenomenon has been documented.

== Descriptions ==
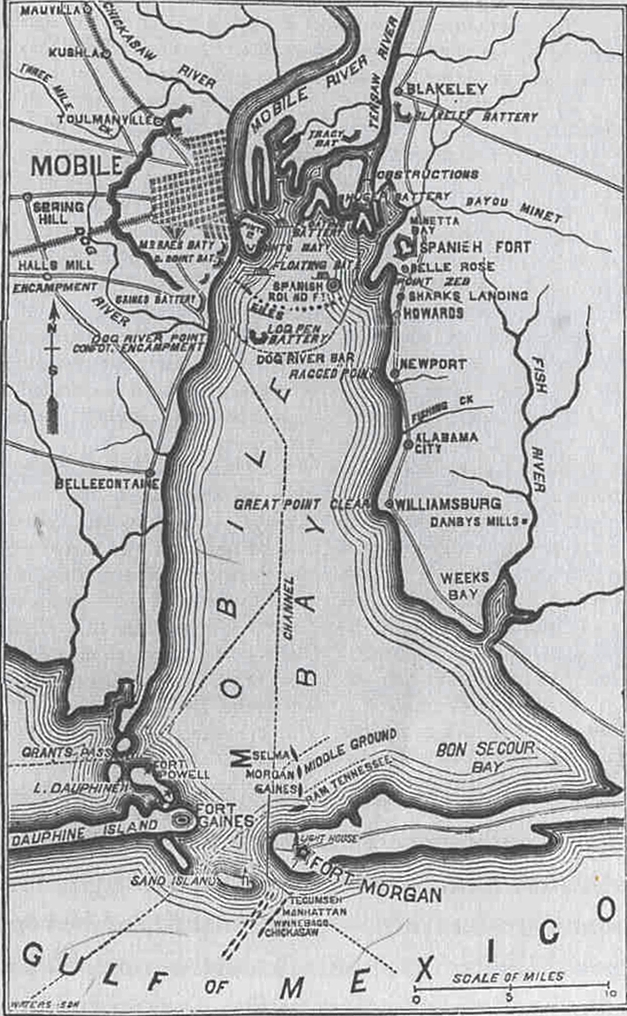
Civil War-era map of Mobile Bay

The Mobile Bay jubilee typically takes place at least annually, and sometimes several times per year; years without a jubilee have been recorded, but they are exceedingly rare. Many accounts of the jubilee exist, the oldest dating back to the 1860s.

The size, scope, and duration of the jubilee can vary greatly. Sometimes a 15-mile (24 km) stretch of coast representing most of the eastern shore can be affected, and at other times the extent can be limited to as little as 500 feet (150 m) of coastline. Smaller jubilees occur more frequently than larger ones, but can be difficult to find. Most jubilees happen in the pre-dawn hours.

Author Archie Carr comments, "At a good jubilee you can quickly fill a washtub with shrimp. You can gig a hundred flounders and fill the back of your pickup truck a foot deep in crabs."

In addition, harvesting them is made considerably easier by the effect that the oxygen deprivation has on the animals. Their behavior has been described as "depressed and moribund", or "unnatural"; crabs are observed "climbing tree stumps to escape the water" and flounder "slither up the banks."

== Causes ==
It was not until 1960 that the phenomenon was explored in-depth by marine biologist Harold Loesch for the journal Ecology. Locals and laymen had based some earlier attempts to explain the animals' strange behaviors on the interaction of sea- and fresh water during the incoming tide.

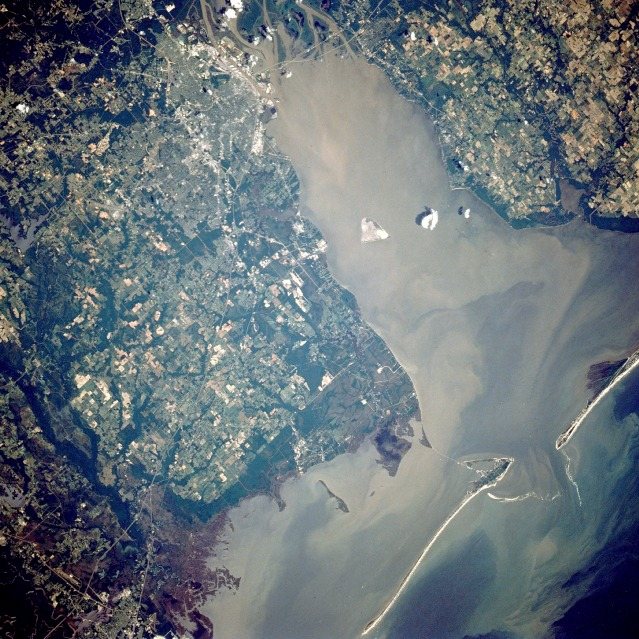
A Landsat image of Mobile Bay facing north-northeast

After researching the oral histories and journalistic records of past jubilees, measuring physical and meteorologic conditions, and taking biological and chemical measurements, Loesch concluded that accumulated organic material on the bay floor could, under a certain set of conditions, result in a rapid depletion of oxygen in parts of the bay, driving fish to the surface seeking oxygenated water.

Another, more comprehensive study by Edwin B. May in 1973, as well as smaller studies by the Alabama Department of Conservation and Natural Resources and the NOAA confirmed many of Loesch's hypotheses. If wind direction, surface temperature, salinity, and tidal variation interact in ways that allow or promote a jubilee, the situation can develop rather quickly. May sums up the mechanism of action thus:

Except during jubilees the water inside the 2 meter contour along the eastern shore is well oxygenated. This shallow water extends several hundred meters offshore. During jubilees fishes present there are trapped between the shore and an advancing water mass low in dissolved oxygen; the water at the surface and very close to shore usually has enough oxygen to support them for the short duration of most jubilees.

— Edwin B. May

== History ==
While the occurrence of jubilees in Mobile Bay predates European settlement in the region, it is unknown exactly when or how these events came to be known by this name. The first recorded printed use of the term "jubilee" in this context was in the Mobile Daily Register (now the Mobile Press-Register) on July 29, 1912:

... Hundreds of live sea crabs and fish ... completely covered the beach at Point Clear and Zundels Sunday morning. A fisherman of experience in explaining the unusual occurrence stated that it was a "jubilee"... People who saw the wild scramble of fish and crabs on the sandy beach say they won't soon forget the sight.

— Mobile Daily Register, July 29, 1912

This was not, however, the first time the newspaper had covered the phenomenon; in his research, oceanographer Edwin B. May found several dozen mentions of similar events, the earliest dated back to July 17, 1867 and alludes to the fact that the phenomenon was known to have happened earlier:

EXCITEMENT AMONG THE FISH—Yesterday all the fish in the bay seemed to be making for the Eastern shore. Large numbers of crabs, flounders and other fish were found at the water's edge, and taken in out of the wet. They were counted by the bushel. Annually this phenomenon occurs with the fish along the Eastern shore. They all appear to forsake the deep water, and swim and cluster in immense numbers to the shore.

— Mobile Daily Register, July 17, 1867

In an oral account from 1960 a local fishing captain named Frank Phillips stated that he had observed jubilee events for the previous 60 years, indicating that "[N]either [the] frequency nor intensity ... had changed". He also stated that his father had also seen jubilee events "...during all his life."

On this map, common Jubilee locations are indicated with red arrows; less-frequent locations are indicated with yellow

== Favorable conditions, locations, and frequency ==
Loesch studied jubilee events spanning 11 years, from 1946–1956, hoping to find patterns in the jubilee occurrence. From this data he was able to conclude several things.

=== Month ===
Month	Jubilees
June	8
July	3
Aug	21
Sept	5

Over the 11-year period studied, the 37 jubilees all occurred between the months of June and September, more frequently in August than all other months combined.

=== Location ===
Jubilees are most common on the upper eastern shore of the bay, from Point Clear to slightly north of Daphne, but they also occur with less frequency south of Point Clear to Mullet Point, and on the Bay's western shore at Deer River and Dog River Point south to Fowl River.

=== Time of day ===
Most jubilees occur in the hours immediately preceding dawn.

=== Wind, rain and tide ===
There is disagreement as to what, if any, effect local rainfall can have on the jubilee. Almost all jubilees occur with an incoming tide, and an easterly wind.

=== Folk consensus ===
Loesch lists five observations that he reported as having a strong concurrence among witnesses of several jubilees:

1. Jubilees occur only in the summer.
2. They usually occur in early morning hours, i.e., before sunrise.
3. The wind on the day previous and during the jubilee is from some easterly direction. If wind direction changes, the jubilee will cease.
4. There is a rising tide during a jubilee; a change to falling will stop the jubilee.
5. There are two water masses meeting, with the saltier water invading during a jubilee.

== Jubilee in local culture ==
The length of coast that serves as the most popular jubilee grounds is densely populated. When a jubilee is spotted people living near the shore will often ring bells and call out to alert their neighbors so that everyone can rush down to the water with washtubs, gigs and nets, and gather a bountiful—and easily reaped—harvest of seafood. As jubilees only happen on warm summer nights, often in the early pre-dawn hours, the event takes on the character of a community beach party, with lights shining into the waters of Mobile Bay.
