= Nitrate in the Mississippi River Basin =

Pollution type in a major American river

The increase in pollution of the Mississippi River has greatly affected the species that live in the water, as well as those who rely on the river for food and recreational purposes. One of the main types of pollution is an excess of nitrate (NO^{−}_{3}) caused by chemical wastes from power plants and agricultural runoffs. The watershed covers about 40% of the lower 48 states, with 7 of the 10 top agricultural producing states being within this watershed.

== Nitrogen cycle ==
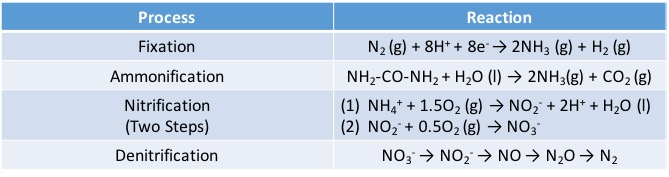
This is a table that identifies the processes of the nitrogen cycle with their corresponding chemical reactions.

Nitrogen undergoes the nitrogen cycle, where it is converted into different forms (i.e nitrogen ($N_2$), nitrate($NO_3^-$), and ammonia ($NH_3$)) through various processes, such as fixation, ammonification, nitrification, and denitrification.

Nitrogen’s impact on the environment is not solely determined on its form within the nitrogen cycle, but the overall concentration of each form. Negative effects on the environment can be observed when these different forms of nitrogen are in excess. The Environmental Protection Agency has set a maximum of 10 mg/L nitrate concentration in drinking and surface waters. When nitrogen in the form of nitrate is in excess, it can lead to a dead zone. A dead zone is a body of water that has a depleted oxygen concentration that is low and can lead to the suffocation of animals. An example of this is the dead zone located off the coast of the Mississippi River. According to NOAA, the 2016 predicted size of this dead zone is going to be approximately 5,898 square miles with a nitrate concentration of 146,000 metric tons of nitrate flowing down the Mississippi and Atchafalaya River into the Gulf of Mexico. Nitrate concentrations have increased significantly (by factors of 2 to greater than 5) since the early 1900s. This is due to the agricultural runoff from the farming states that are released into the Mississippi River. More than half (52%) of the nitrogen concentration comes from soybeans and corn.

== Concentration of nitrate ==
Proper investigation of nitrite concentration changes and effects requires accurate quantification of nitrite levels The Weighted Regressions on Time, Discharge, and Season (WRTDS) method is used to estimate the concentration. The following equation provides the estimate:

$\ln(c)=\beta_0+\beta_1t+\beta_2ln(Q)+\beta_3sin(2\pi t)+\beta_4cos(2\pi t)+\varepsilon$ (1)

where $c$ is the nitrate concentration, $\beta_0$, $\beta_1$.$\beta_2$, $\beta_3$, and $\beta_4$ are fitted coefficients, $t$ is time, $Q$ is mean daily streamflow, and $\varepsilon$ is the unexpected variability from other sources. This calibration curve is generated every day and compared to the one for the previous day. An issue found with this is that the discharge changes day by day. This variation of discharge can increase the concentration one day, and the next day, there could be a decrease in it. This can make it problematic to observe the trends in the concentrations.

== Trends ==
Land use practices in the Mississippi River Basin have significantly decreased the amount of available nitrogen in the soil. This nitrogen is usually in the form of nitrate. The nitrate seeps through the soil and gets into the ground water through agricultural practices such as tile drainage, which eventually makes its way into the surface waters. Nitrate concentration can be dangerous passed a certain level. The water in the Des Moines River is near the maximum legal level of nitrate concentrations for drinking water, and the EPA has declared much of the fish in the river unsafe to eat.

Nitrate concentration estimations were made from 1980 to 2010 at a site of the Mississippi River above the Old River Outflow Channel, which is also known as the Old River Control Structure. Its purpose is to flow the water from the Mississippi River into the Atchafalaya Basin in order to prevent the Mississippi River from changing course. This study shows that from 1980 to 2010, the nitrate concentrations remained constant; however, there was a 12% increase in the concentration from 2000 to 2010. The sources of this nitrogen are unknown and the reasons as to why nitrate is increasing in some areas of the Mississippi River Basin while decreasing in others is still a mystery. However, nitrate concentrations were higher during the fall and winter months as opposed to the spring and summer months. This general increasing trend is what leads scientists to believe the dead zone in the Gulf of Mexico at the mouth of the Mississippi River is growing.

Drainage from crop fields has caused nitrate to leach into groundwater, which has adversely affected some drinking water sources in the Mississippi River Basin. In surface waters, high nitrate levels have led to instances of eutrophication, which have caused dissolved oxygen levels to significantly decrease in affected water bodies including the coastal waters of the Gulf of Mexico. Furthermore, altered nitrate to silicate ratios have caused coastal marine ecosystems to move away from a diatom based system to a less productive system.

== Remediation ==
A possible way to lower the concentrations of nitrate is to rebuild landscapes. Grass and catch crop buffers and forest buffers are successful at preventing a buildup of excess nitrate. Any increase in vegetation leads to a decrease in the nitrate concentration, due to its uptake into the plant. The wetlands are the natural barrier to this, but they are being rapidly destroyed. The best way to prevent the dead zone is to remediate and rebuild the wetlands off the coast of Louisiana. In order for at least 40% of nitrate concentrations to be removed, 22,000 square kilometers of wetlands have to be rebuilt. This proves to be difficult because that would require 65 times the amount of wetland restorations that has happened over the past 10 years.

Changing agricultural practices could help solve the nitrate problem as well. Strip-till farming and the use of Winter Cover crops have the effect of minimizing nitrate leaching.
