= Mario Lösch =

Austrian footballer

Personal information
- Full name: Mario Lösch
- Date of birth: 13 September 1989 (age 37)
- Place of birth: Oberpullendorf, Austria
- Height: 1.88 m (6 ft 2 in)
- Position: Defensive midfielder

Team information
- Current team: Ritzing
- Number: 12

Senior career*
Years	Team	Apps	(Gls)
2005–2008	Derby County	0	(0)
2008–2010	Mattersburg	6	(0)
2010–	Ritzing	24	(0)
- * Club domestic league appearances and goals as of 16:33, 11 August 2009 (UTC)

Mario Lösch (born 13 September 1989) is an Austrian professional association football player, currently playing for Austrian Football Bundesliga side SV Mattersburg. He plays as a defensive midfielder.
