= Harold Loesch =

American marine biologist

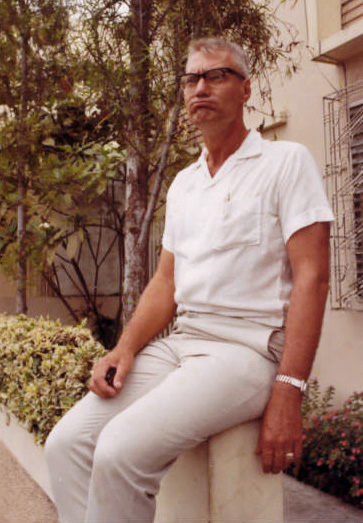
- Born: October 3, 1926; McGregor, Texas
- Died: May 12, 2011 (aged 84)
- Education: Texas A&M University
- Known for: Research on commercial fisheries in the developing world
- Scientific career
- Fields: Marine Biology
- Workplaces: Louisiana State University, Texas A&M University, UNESCO, FAO

Harold Carl Otto Loesch (October 3, 1926 – May 12, 2011) was a marine biologist and oceanographer who is credited with being the first to examine the Mobile Bay jubilee in an academic journal (Ecology).^{paper}

Much of his career was as an academic holding a professorship in the Department of Marine Sciences at Louisiana State University, though he also spent many years working for the United Nations agencies UNESCO and FAO to develop fisheries in newly industrialized countries. His principal areas of research were shrimp, copepods, and commercial fisheries development.

== Academic career ==
Loesch received his Ph.D. in biological oceanography from Texas A&M University in 1962. He served as a professor at Louisiana State University in Baton Rouge, Louisiana in the Department of Zoology and Physiology in 1968 and 1969, and then as a Professor of Marine Sciences from 1969 to 1975. During this time he studied shrimp fisheries in nearby Barataria Bay in association with the National Science Foundation Sea Grant Development Office.

He also held the titles of visiting professor in both the Organization of American States Marine Sciences Program in Guayaquil, Ecuador, and at The School for Field Studies Marine Ecology program at South Caicos Island in the British West Indies.

== Work with UNESCO and FAO ==
From 1960 to 1968 Loesch worked as a shrimp biologist and fisheries officer for the Food and Agriculture Organization of the United Nations in Guatemala City, Guatemala, Guayaquil, Ecuador and Tegucigalpa, and La Ceiba, Honduras.

After teaching at Louisiana State University, he returned to the service of the United Nations, this time with the United Nations Educational, Scientific and Cultural Organization (UNESCO). He served as lead biologist for the United Nations Development Programme at Monterrey Institute of Technology and Higher Education and at the National Autonomous University of Mexico Marine Station in Ciudad del Carmen, Mexico from 1976 to 1980.

He served once again with FAO as a project manager for a fishery development project in Dhaka, Bangladesh from 1981 to 1986.

Loesch died in May 2011 in Pensacola, Florida, leaving behind five children, seven grandchildren, and five great-grandchildren.

== Publications ==
- Loesch, Harold (1954), "A haplosporidian hyperparasite of oysters", Proceedings of the National Shellfisheries Association, 45: 182–183
- —— (1957), "Studies on the ecology of two species of Donax on Mustang Island", Institute of Marine Sciences, 4: 201–227
- —— (1957), "Observations on bait shrimping activities in rivers north of the Mobile Bay Causeway", Journal of the Alabama Academy of Science, 29: 36–43
- —— (1960), "Sporadic mass shoreward migrations of demersal fish and crustaceans in Mobile Bay, Alabama", Ecology, 41 (2): 292–298, Bibcode:1960Ecol...41..292L, doi:10.2307/1930218, JSTOR 1930218
- —— (1961), "The developing shrimp fishery of Honduras", Proceedings of the Gulf and Caribbean Fisheries Institute, 14: 171–178
- —— (1963), "Recursos de Camarones", FAO, EPTA Report (Report to the Government of Honduras), 1787
- —— (1964), "Claves para identificaciȍn de camarones peneidos de interés comercial en el Ecuador (keys for the identification of penaeid shrimp of commercial importance in Ecuador)", Boletin Cientifico y Tecnico. Instituto Nacional de Pesca del Ecuador, 1 (2): 1–29
- —— (1965), "Distribution and growth of penaeid shrimp in Mobile Bay, Alabama", Publications of the Institute of Marine Sciences, 10: 41–58
- —— (1965), "Identificaciȍn de los camarones (Penaeidae) juveniles de los esteros del Ecuador (Identification of juvenile shrimp (Penaeidae) in Ecuadorian estuaries)", Boletin Cientifico y Tecnico. Instituto Nacional de Pesca del Ecuador, 1 (3): 1–24
- —— (1966), "Observaciȍn de ballenas en aguas ecuatorianas (Observations on whales in Ecuadorian waters)", Boletin Cientifico y Tecnico. Instituto Nacional de Pesca del Ecuador, 1 (4): 1–17
- —— (1966), "Observaciones sobre la langosta de la costa continental del Ecuador (Observations on the lobster of the continental coast of Ecuador)", Boletin Cientifico y Tecnico. Instituto Nacional de Pesca del Ecuador, 1 (5): 1–30
- —— (1966), "Estudio estadistico de la pesca del camarȍn en el Ecuador y de algunas caracteristicas biologicas de las especies explotadas (statistical study of the shrimp fishery in Ecuador and some biological characteristics of the exploited species)", Boletin Cientifico y Tecnico. Instituto Nacional de Pesca del Ecuador, 1 (6): 1–25
- —— (1966), "Estudios sobre las poblaciones de camarȍn blanco en el Ecuador (Studies of the white shrimp populations in Ecuador)", Boletin Cientifico y Tecnico. Instituto Nacional de Pesca del Ecuador, 1 (7): 1–47
- ——; Loesch, H. (1967), "The lobsters of the Galapagos Islands", Crustaceana, 12 (2): 214–222, doi:10.1163/156854067X00620
- —— (1968), "Observaciones sobre la presencia de camarones juveniles en dos esteros de la costa del Ecuador (Some observations on juvenile shrimp in two estuaries in Ecuador)", Boletin Cientifico y Tecnico. Instituto Nacional de Pesca del Ecuador, 1 (8): 1–30
- —— (1970), "Shrimp sampling techniques and preliminary results in two small areas in Barataria Bay, Louisiana", LSU Coastal Studies Institute Bulletin, 5: 65–81
- —— (1970), "Some notes on fish collected near Barataria Bay, Louisiana", LSU Coastal Studies Institute Bulletin, 5: 83–87
- —— (1971), "Some observations on amounts of nanoplankton, nematodes, copepods, fish, and shrimp found in the Barataria Bay area, Louisiana", LSU Coastal Studies Institute Bulletin, 6: 38–44
- —— (1971), "A preliminary two-year comparison of Penaeus aztecus; growth rate, distribution, and biomass in the Barataria Bay area, Louisiana", LSU Coastal Studies Institute Bulletin, 6: 45–55
- —— (1971), "Studies on the fishes of Barataria Bay, Louisiana, and estuarine community", LSU Coastal Studies Institute Bulletin, 6: 55–66
- —— (1971), "Some observations and recommendations on (Penaeus) shrimp management practices and results as related to Honduras", Boletin Tec. Proyecto Reg. De Desarrollo Pesca en Centroamerica, 6: 1–18 (Spanish), 19–29 (English)
- —— (1972), "Algunas notas sobre el analistis de los datos de pesca de arrastre del Instituto Nacional de Pesca (Some notes on the analysis of trawl fishery data of the National Institute of Fisheries of Ecuador)", Boletin Cientifico y Tecnico. Instituto Nacional de Pesca del Ecuador, 2 (2): 1–13
- ——; Day, John W; Hershman, Marc J; Smith, William G; Loesch, Harold C; Gagliano, Sherwood M; Gosselink, James G (1973), "Commentary -- on the limitations of the National Environmental Policy Act", Ecology, 54 (2): 231–232, doi:10.2307/1934333, JSTOR 1934333
- —— (1976), "Some observations of dying seabob shrimp -- Xiphopenaeus kroyeri -- trapped in a beach trough during a falling tide", Proceedings of the Louisiana Academy of Sciences, 38: 16–19
- —— (1976), "Shrimp population densities within Mobile Bay", Gulf Coast Reports, 5 (2): 11–16, doi:10.18785/grr.0502.02
- —— (1976), "Technique for estimating trawl efficiency in catching brown shrimp (Penaeus aztecus), Atlantic croaker (Micropogon undulatus) and spot (Leiostomus xanthurus)", Gulf Coast Reports, 5 (2): 29–32, doi:10.18785/grr.0502.04
- —— (1976), "Penaeid shrimp distributions in Mobile Bay, Alabama, including low salinity records", Gulf Coast Reports, 5 (2): 43–45
- —— (1976), "Photoperiodic effects on salinity selection in the gulf killifish (Fundulus grandis)", Copia, 3 (3): 605–608, doi:10.2307/1443390, JSTOR 1443390
- —— (1976), "Observations on menhaden (Brevoortia) recruitment and growth in Mobile Bay, Alabama", Louisiana Academy of Sciences, 39: 35–42
- —— (1977), Hall, C.; Day, J. (eds.), "Modeling man and nature in South Louisiana", Ecosystem Modeling in Theory and Practice, vol. 61, no. 1, Wiley, New York, pp. 381–392, JSTOR 5528
- —— (1979), "Some ecological observations on slow swimming nekton with emphasis on Penaeid shrimp in a small Mexican west coast estuary", Anales del Centro de Ciencias de Mar, U. Na. Cent. De Mexico
- —— (1985), "Study on the distribution of finfish larvae in the vicinity of brackish water aquaculture ponds of Satkhira, Bangladesh", Brigham Young University
