= Lisch =

Lisch is a surname. Notable people with the surname include:

- Juste Lisch (1828–1910), French architect
- Karl Lisch (1907–1999), Austrian ophthalmologist
- Kevin Lisch (born 1986), Australian basketball player
- Michael Lisch (born 1990), American soccer player
- Rusty Lisch (born 1956), American football player
