= Dead zone (ecology) =

Low-oxygen areas in coastal zones and lakes caused by eutrophication

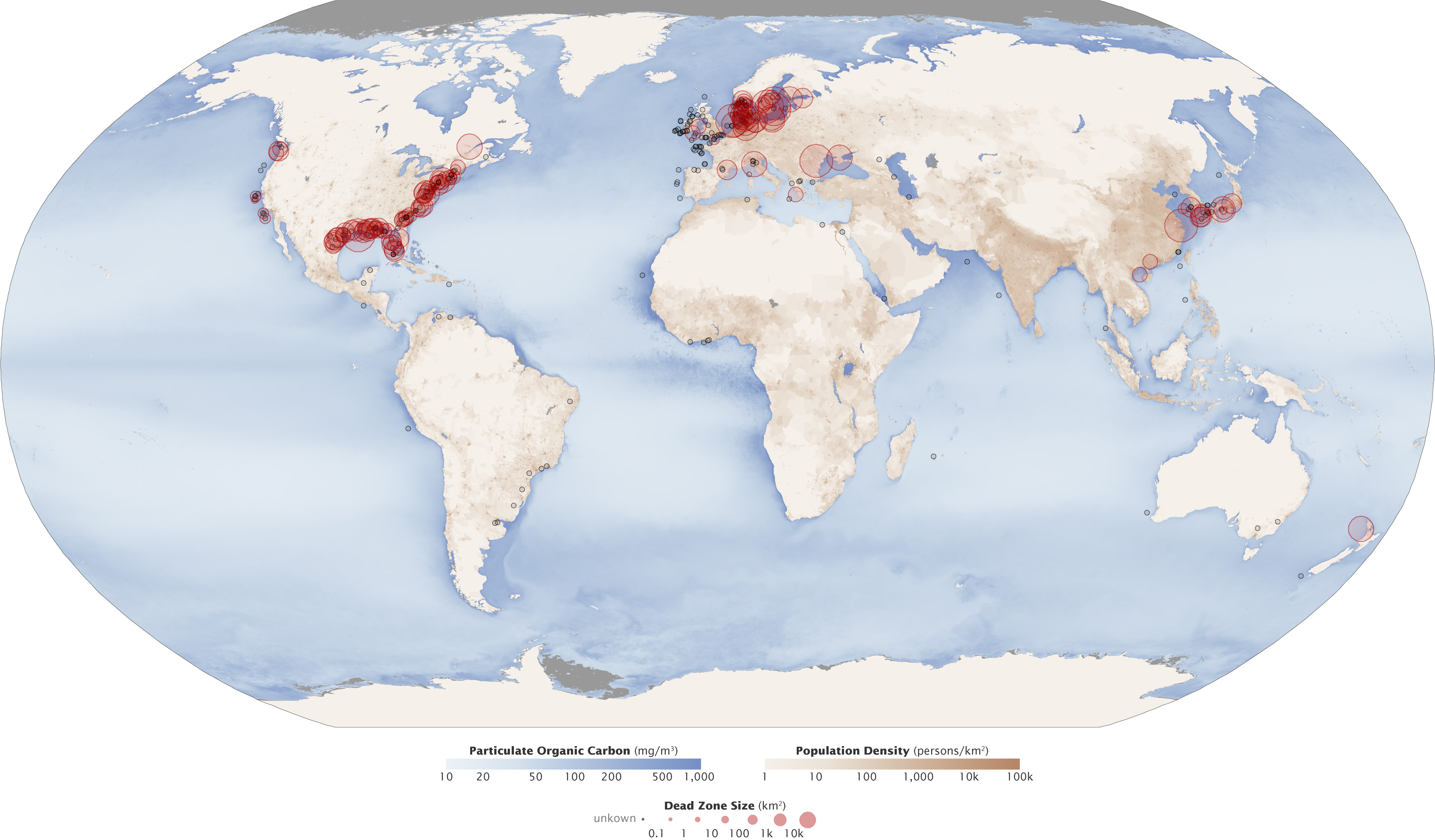
Red circles show the location and size of many dead zones (in 2008). Black dots show dead zones of unknown size. The size and number of marine dead zones—areas where the deep water is so low in dissolved oxygen that sea creatures cannot survive (except for some specialized bacteria)—have grown in the past half-century.

Dead zones are hypoxic (low-oxygen) areas in the world's oceans and large lakes. Hypoxia occurs when dissolved oxygen (DO) concentration falls to or below 2 mg of O_{2}/liter. When a body of water experiences hypoxic conditions, aquatic flora and fauna begin to change behavior in order to reach sections of water with higher oxygen levels. Once DO declines below 0.5 mg O_{2}/liter in a body of water, mass mortality occurs. With such a low concentration of DO, these bodies of water fail to support the aquatic life living there. Historically, many of these sites were naturally occurring. However, in the 1970s, oceanographers began noting increased instances and expanses of dead zones. These occur near inhabited coastlines, where aquatic life is most concentrated.

Coastal regions, such as the Baltic Sea, the northern Gulf of Mexico, and the Chesapeake Bay, as well as large enclosed water bodies like Lake Erie, have been affected by deoxygenation due to eutrophication. Excess nutrients are put into these systems by rivers, ultimately from urban and agricultural runoff and exacerbated by deforestation. These nutrients lead to high productivity that produces organic material that sinks to the bottom and is respired. The respiration of that organic material uses up the oxygen and causes hypoxia or anoxia.

The UN Environment Programme reported 146 dead zones in 2004 in the world's oceans where marine life could not be supported due to depleted oxygen levels. Some of these were as small as a square kilometer (0.4 mi^{2}), but the largest dead zone covered 70,000 square kilometers (27,000 mi^{2}). A 2008 study counted 405 dead zones worldwide.

== Causes ==
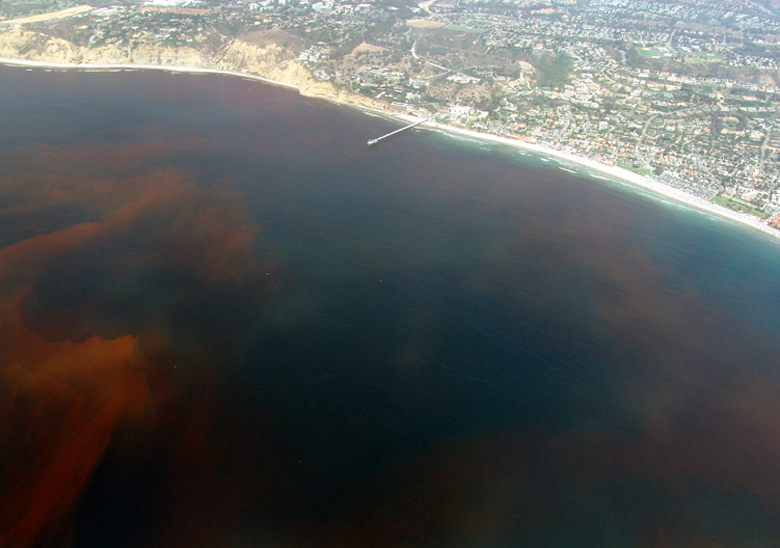
Dead zones are often caused by the decay of algae during algal blooms, like this one off the coast of La Jolla, San Diego, California.

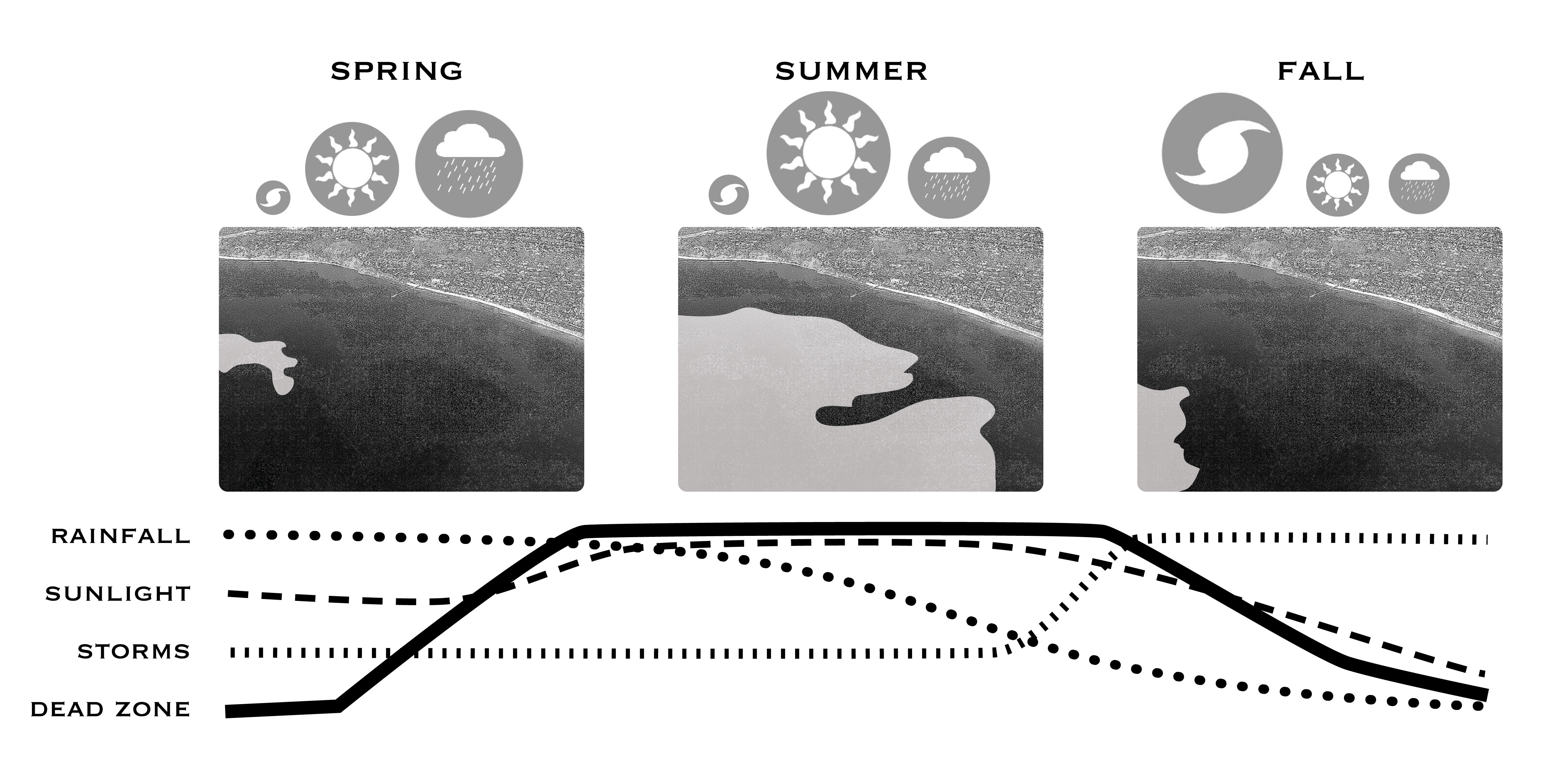
Climate has a significant impact on the growth and decline of ecological dead zones. During spring months, as rainfall increases, more nutrient-rich water flows down the mouth of the Mississippi River. At the same time, as sunlight increases during the spring, algal growth in the dead zones increases dramatically. In fall months, tropical storms begin to enter the Gulf of Mexico and break up the dead zones, and the cycle repeats again in the spring.

Aquatic and marine dead zones can be caused by an increase in nutrients (particularly nitrogen and phosphorus) in the water, known as eutrophication. These nutrients are the fundamental building blocks of single-celled, plant-like organisms that live in the water column, and whose growth is limited in part by the availability of these materials. With more available nutrients, single-celled aquatic organisms (such as algae and cyanobacteria) have the resources necessary to exceed their previous growth limit and begin to multiply at an exponential rate. Exponential growth leads to rapid increases in the density of certain types of these phytoplankton, a phenomenon known as an algal bloom.

Limnologist David Schindler, whose research at the Experimental Lakes Area led to the banning of harmful phosphates in detergents, warned about algal blooms and dead zones,

"The fish-killing blooms that devastated the Great Lakes in the 1960s and 1970s haven't gone away; they've moved west into an arid world in which people, industry, and agriculture are increasingly taxing the quality of what little freshwater there is to be had here....This isn't just a prairie problem. Global expansion of dead zones caused by algal blooms is rising rapidly."

Dead zones can be caused by natural and by anthropogenic factors. Natural causes include coastal upwelling, changes in wind, and water circulation patterns. Other environmental factors that determine the occurrence or intensity of a dead zone include long water residence times, high temperatures, and high levels of sunlight penetration through the water column.

Additionally, natural oceanographic phenomena can cause deoxygenation of parts of the water column. For example, enclosed bodies of water, such as fjords or the Black Sea, have shallow sills at their entrances, causing water to be trapped there for a long time. The eastern tropical Pacific Ocean and northern Indian Ocean have lowered oxygen concentrations which are thought to be in regions where there is minimal circulation to replace the oxygen that is consumed. These areas are also known as oxygen minimum zones (OMZ). In many cases, OMZs are permanent or semi-permanent areas.

Anthropogenic causes include use of chemical fertilizers and their subsequent presence in water runoff and groundwater, direct sewage discharge into rivers and lakes, and nutrient discharge into groundwater from large, accumulated quantities of animal waste. Use of chemical fertilizers is considered the major human-related cause of dead zones around the world. However, runoff from sewage, urban land use, and fertilizers can also contribute to eutrophication.

In August 2017, a report suggested that the US meat industry and agroeconomic system are predominantly responsible for the largest-ever dead zone in the Gulf of Mexico. Soil runoff and leached nitrate, exacerbated by agricultural land management and tillage practices as well as manure and synthetic fertilizer usage, contaminated water from the Heartland to the Gulf of Mexico. A large portion of the plant matter by-products from crops grown in this region are used as major feed components in the production of meat animals for agribusiness companies, like Tyson and Smithfield Foods.

Changes in ocean circulation triggered by ongoing climate change could also add or magnify other causes of oxygen reductions in the ocean. Scientific studies of the water column, wind and discharge patterns near the mouths of the Mississippi and Atchafalaya Rivers has demonstrated certain exchanges of bottom water in the Texas-Louisiana shelf that might impact the dynamics within the dead zone.

Remains of organisms found within sediment layers near the mouth of the Mississippi River indicate four hypoxic events before the advent of synthetic fertilizer. In these sediment layers, anoxia-tolerant species are the most prevalent remains found. The periods indicated by the sediment record correspond to historic records of high river flow recorded by instruments at Vicksburg, Mississippi.

== Types ==
Dead zones can be classified by type, and are identified by the length of their occurrence:

- Permanent dead zones are deep water occurrences that rarely exceed 2 milligrams per liter.
- Temporary dead zones are short lived dead zones lasting hours or days.
- Seasonal dead zones are annually occurring, typically in warm months of summer and autumn.
- Diel cycling hypoxia is a specific seasonal dead zone that only becomes hypoxic during the night

The type of dead zone can, in some ways, be categorized by the time required for the water to return to full health. This time frame depends on the intensity of eutrophication and level of oxygen depletion. A water body that sinks to anoxic conditions and experiences extreme reduction in community diversity will have to travel a much longer path to return to full health. A water body that only experiences mild hypoxia and maintains community diversity and maturity will require a much shorter path length to return to full health.

== Effects ==
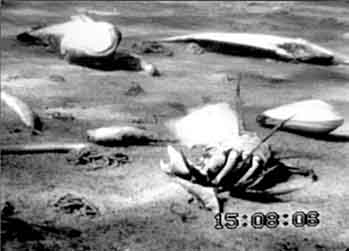
Underwater video frame of the sea floor in the western Baltic covered with dead or dying crabs, fish and clams killed by oxygen depletion

Due to the hypoxic conditions present in dead zones, marine life within these areas tends to be scarce. Most fish and motile organisms tend to emigrate out of the zone as oxygen concentrations fall, and benthic populations may experience severe losses when oxygen concentrations are below 0.5 mg l^{−1} O_{2}. In severe anoxic conditions, microbial life may experience dramatic shifts in community identity as well, resulting in an increased abundance of anaerobic organisms as aerobic microbes decrease in number and switch energy sources for oxidation such as nitrate, sulfate, or iron reduction. Sulfur reduction is a particular concern as hydrogen sulfide is toxic and stresses most organisms within the zone further, exacerbating mortality risks.

Low oxygen levels can have severe effects on survivability of organisms inside the area while above lethal anoxic conditions. Studies conducted along the Gulf Coast of North America have shown hypoxic conditions lead to reduction of reproductive rates and growth rates in a variety of organisms including fish and benthic invertebrates. Organisms able to leave the area typically do so when oxygen concentrations decrease to less than 2 mg l^{−1}. At these oxygen concentrations and below, organisms that survive inside the oxygen deficient environment and are unable to escape the area will often exhibit progressively worsening stress behavior and die. Surviving organisms tolerant of hypoxic conditions often exhibit physiological adaptations appropriate for persisting within hypoxic environments. Examples of such adaptations include increased efficiency of oxygen intake and use, lowering required amount of oxygen intake through reduced growth rates or dormancy, and increasing the usage of anaerobic metabolic pathways.

Community composition in benthic communities is dramatically disrupted by periodic oxygen depletion events, such as those of seasonal dead zones and occurring as a result of diel cycles. The long term effects of such hypoxic conditions result in a shift in communities, most commonly manifesting as a decrease in species diversity through mass mortality events. Reestablishment of benthic communities depend upon composition of adjacent communities for larval recruitment. This results in a shift towards faster establishing colonizers with shorter and more opportunistic life strategies, potentially disrupting historic benthic compositions.

=== Fisheries ===
The influence of dead zones on fisheries and other marine commercial activities varies by the length of occurrence and location. Dead zones are often accompanied by a decrease in biodiversity and collapse in benthic populations, lowering the diversity of yield in commercial fishing operations, but in cases of eutrophication-related dead zone formations, the increase in nutrient availability can lead to temporary rises in select yields among pelagic populations, such as anchovies. However, studies estimate that the increased production in the surrounding areas do not offset the net decrease in productivity resulting from the dead zone. For instance, an estimated 17,000 MT of carbon in the form of prey for fisheries has been lost as a result of dead zones in the Gulf of Mexico. Additionally, many stressors in fisheries are worsened by hypoxic conditions. Indirect factors such as increased success by invasive species and increased pandemic intensity in stressed species such as oysters both lead to losses in revenue and ecological stability in affected regions.

=== Coral reefs ===
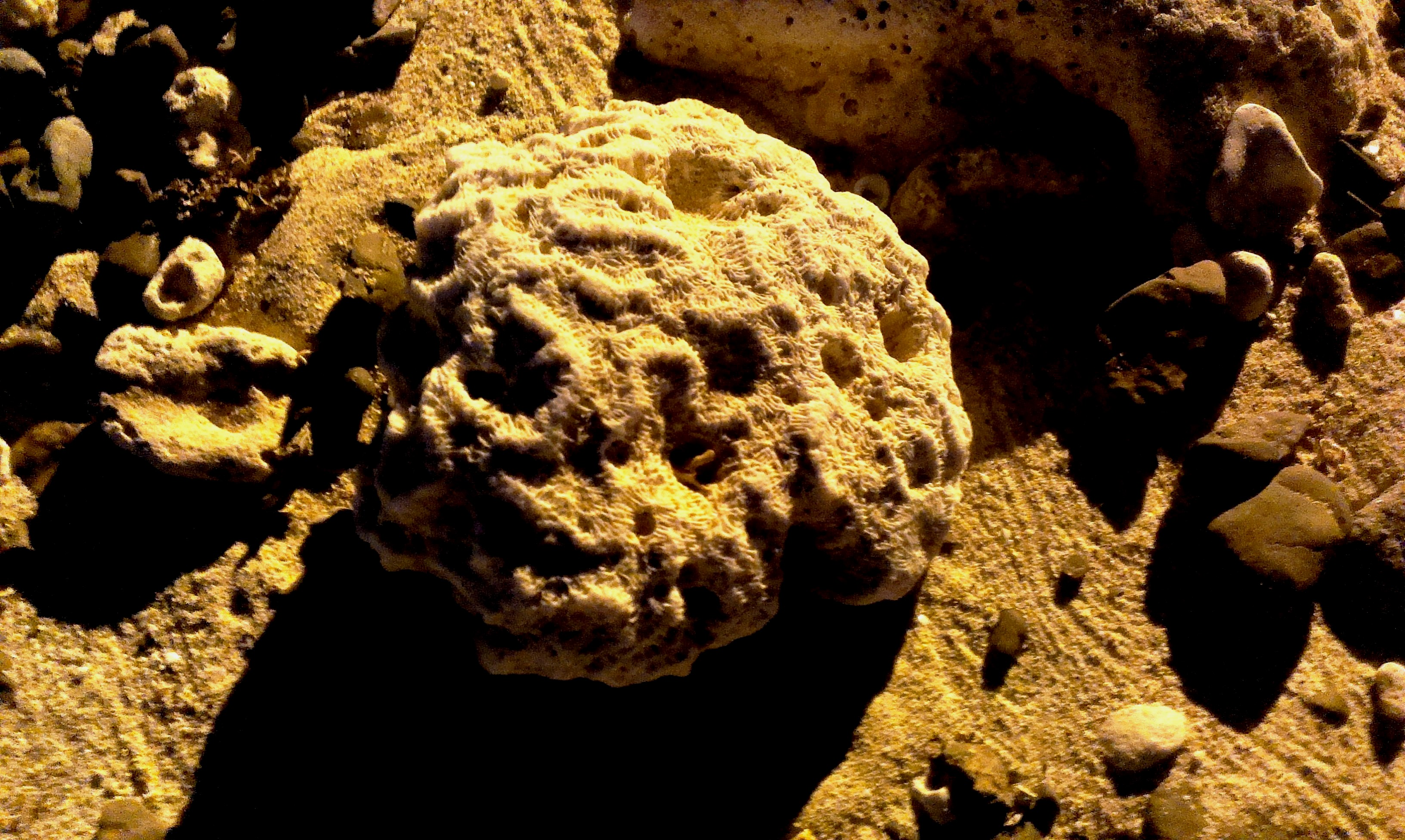
In many places, coral reefs are experiencing worse hypoxia which can lead to bleaching and mass coral die-offs.

There has been a severe increase in mass mortality events associated with low oxygen causing mass hypoxia with the majority having been in the last 2 decades. The rise in water temperature leads to an increase in oxygen demand and the increase for ocean deoxygenation which causes these large coral reef dead zones. For many coral reefs, the response to this hypoxia is very dependent on the magnitude and duration of the deoxygenation. The symptoms can be anywhere from reduced photosynthesis and calcification to bleaching. Hypoxia can have indirect effects like the abundance of algae and spread of coral diseases in the ecosystems. While coral is unable to handle such low levels of oxygen, algae is quite tolerant. Because of this, in interaction zones between algae and coral, increased hypoxia will cause more coral death and higher spread of algae. The increase mass coral dead zones is reinforced by the spread of coral diseases. Coral diseases can spread easily when there are high concentrations of sulfide and hypoxic conditions. Due to the loop of hypoxia and coral reef mortality, the fish and other marine life that inhabit the coral reefs have a change in behavioral in response to the hypoxia. Some fish will go upwards to find more oxygenated water, and some enter a phase of metabolic and ventilatory depression. Invertebrates migrate out of their homes to the surface of substratum or move to the tips of arborescent coral colonies.

Around six million people, the majority who live in developing countries, depend on coral reef fisheries. These mass die-offs due to extreme hypoxic events can have severe impacts on reef fish populations. Coral reef ecosystems offer a variety of essential ecosystem services including shoreline protection, nitrogen fixation, and waste assimilation, and tourism opportunities. The continued decline of oxygen in oceans on coral reefs is concerning because it takes many years (decades) to repair and regrow corals.

=== Jellyfish blooms ===
Despite most other life forms being killed by the lack of oxygen, jellyfish can thrive and are sometimes present in dead zones in vast numbers. Jellyfish blooms produce large quantities of mucus, leading to major changes in food webs in the ocean since few organisms feed on them. The organic carbon in mucus is metabolized by bacteria which return it to the atmosphere in the form of carbon dioxide in what has been termed a "jelly carbon shunt". The potential worsening of jellyfish blooms as a result of human activities has driven new research into the influence of dead zones on jelly populations. The primary concern is the potential for dead zones to serve as breeding grounds for jelly populations as a result of the hypoxic conditions driving away competition for resources and common predators of jellyfish. The increased population of jellyfish could have high commercial costs with loss of fisheries, destruction and contamination of trawling nets and fishing vessels, and lowered tourism revenue in coastal systems.

=== Seagrass beds ===
Globally, seagrass has been declining rapidly. It is estimated that 21% of the 71 known seagrass species have decreasing population trends and 11% of those species have been designated as threatened on the ICUN Red List. Hypoxia that leads to eutrophication caused from ocean deoxygenation is one of the main underlying factors of these die-offs. Eutrophication causes enhanced nutrient enrichment which can result in seagrass productivity, but with continual nutrient enrichment in seagrass meadows, it can cause excessive growth of microalgae, epiphytes and phytoplankton resulting in hypoxic conditions.

Seagrass is both a source and a sink for oxygen in the surrounding water column and sediments. At night, the inner part of seagrass oxygen pressure is linearly related to the oxygen concentration in the water column, so low water column oxygen concentrations often result in hypoxic seagrass tissues, which can eventually kill off the seagrass. Normally, seagrass sediments must supply oxygen to the below-ground tissue through either photosynthesis or by diffusing oxygen from the water column through leaves to rhizomes and roots. However, with the change in seagrass oxygen balances, it can often result in hypoxic seagrass tissues. Seagrass exposed to this hypoxic water column show increased respiration, reduced rates of photosynthesis, smaller leaves, and reduced number of leaves per shoot. This causes insufficient supply of oxygen to the belowground tissues for aerobic respiration, so seagrass must rely on the less-efficient anaerobic respiration. Seagrass die-offs create a positive feedback loop in which the mortality events cause more death as higher oxygen demands are created when dead plant material decomposes.

Because hypoxia increases the invasion of sulfides in seagrass, this negatively affects seagrass through photosynthesis, metabolism and growth. Generally, seagrass is able to combat the sulfides by supplying enough oxygen to the roots. However, deoxygenation causes the seagrass to be unable to supply this oxygen, thus killing it off.

Deoxygenation reduces the diversity of organisms inhabiting seagrass beds by eliminating species that cannot tolerate the low oxygen conditions. Indirectly, the loss and degradation of seagrass threatens numerous species that rely on seagrass for either shelter or food. The loss of seagrass also effects the physical characteristics and resilience of seagrass ecosystems. Seagrass beds provide nursery grounds and habitat to many harvested commercial, recreational, and subsistence fish and shellfish. In many tropical regions, local people are dependent on seagrass associated fisheries as a source of food and income.

Seagrass also provides many ecosystem services including water purification, coastal protection, erosion control, sequestration and delivery of trophic subsidies to adjacent marine and terrestrial habitats. Continued deoxygenation causes the effects of hypoxia to be compounded by climate change which will increase the decline in seagrass populations.

=== Mangrove forests ===
Compared to seagrass beds and coral reefs, hypoxia is more common on a regular basis in mangrove ecosystems, though ocean deoxygenation is compounding the negative effects of anthropogenic nutrient inputs and land use modification.

Like seagrass, mangrove trees transport oxygen to roots of rhizomes, reduce sulfide concentrations, and alter microbial communities. Dissolved oxygen is more readily consumed in the interior of the mangrove forest. Anthropogenic inputs may push the limits of survival in many mangrove microhabitats. For example, shrimp ponds constructed in mangrove forests are considered the greatest anthropogenic threat to mangrove ecosystems. These shrimp ponds reduce estuary circulation and water quality which leads to the promotion of diel-cycling hypoxia. When the quality of the water degrades, the shrimp ponds are quickly abandoned, leaving massive amounts of wastewater. This is a major source of water pollution that promotes ocean deoxygenation in the adjacent habitats.

Due to these frequent hypoxic conditions, the water does not provide habitats to fish. When exposed to extreme hypoxia, ecosystem function can completely collapse. Extreme deoxygenation will affect the local fish populations, which are an essential food source. The environmental costs of shrimp farms in the mangrove forests grossly outweigh their economic benefits. Cessation of shrimp production and restoration of these areas and reduce eutrophication and anthropogenic hypoxia.

== Locations ==
In the 1970s, marine dead zones were first noted in settled areas where intensive economic use stimulated scientific scrutiny: in the U.S. East Coast's Chesapeake Bay, in Scandinavia's strait called the Kattegat, which is the mouth of the Baltic Sea and in other important Baltic Sea fishing grounds, in the Black Sea, and in the northern Adriatic.

Other marine dead zones have appeared in coastal waters of South America, China, Japan, and New Zealand. A 2008 study counted 405 dead zones worldwide.

=== Baltic Sea ===
Researchers from Baltic Nest Institute published in one of PNAS issues reports that the dead zones in the Baltic Sea have grown from approximately 5,000 km^{2} to more than 60,000 km^{2} in recent years.

Some of the causes behind the elevated increase of dead zones can be attributed to the use of fertilizers, large animal farms, the burning of fossil fuels, and effluents from municipal wastewater treatment plants.

With its massive size, the Baltic Sea is best analyzed in sub-areas rather than as a whole. In a paper published in 2004, researchers specifically divided the Baltic Sea into 9 sub-areas, each having its own specific characteristics. The 9 sub-areas are discerned as follows: Gulf of Bothnia, Archipelago region, Gulf of Finland, Gulf of Riga, Gulf of Gdansk, Swedish East-coast, Central Baltic, Belt Sea region, and Kattegat. Each sub-area has responded differently to nutrient additions and eutrophication; however, there are a few general patterns and measures for the Baltic Sea as a whole. As the researchers Rönnberg and Bonsdorff state,

Irrespective of the area-specific effects of the increased loads of nutrients to the Baltic Sea, the sources are more or less similar in the whole region. The extent and the severity of the discharges may differ, however. As is seen in e.g. HELCOM (1996) and Rönnberg (2001), the major sources in the input of nutrients are derived from agriculture, industry, municipal sewage and transports. Nitrogen emissions in form of atmospheric depositions are also important, as well as local point sources, such as aquaculture and leakage from forestry.

In general, each area of the Baltic Sea is experiencing similar anthropogenic effects. As Rönnberg and Bonsdorff state, "Eutrophication is a serious problem in the Baltic Sea area." However, when it comes to implementation of water revival programs, each area likely will need to be handled on a local level.

=== Virginia ===
==== Chesapeake Bay ====
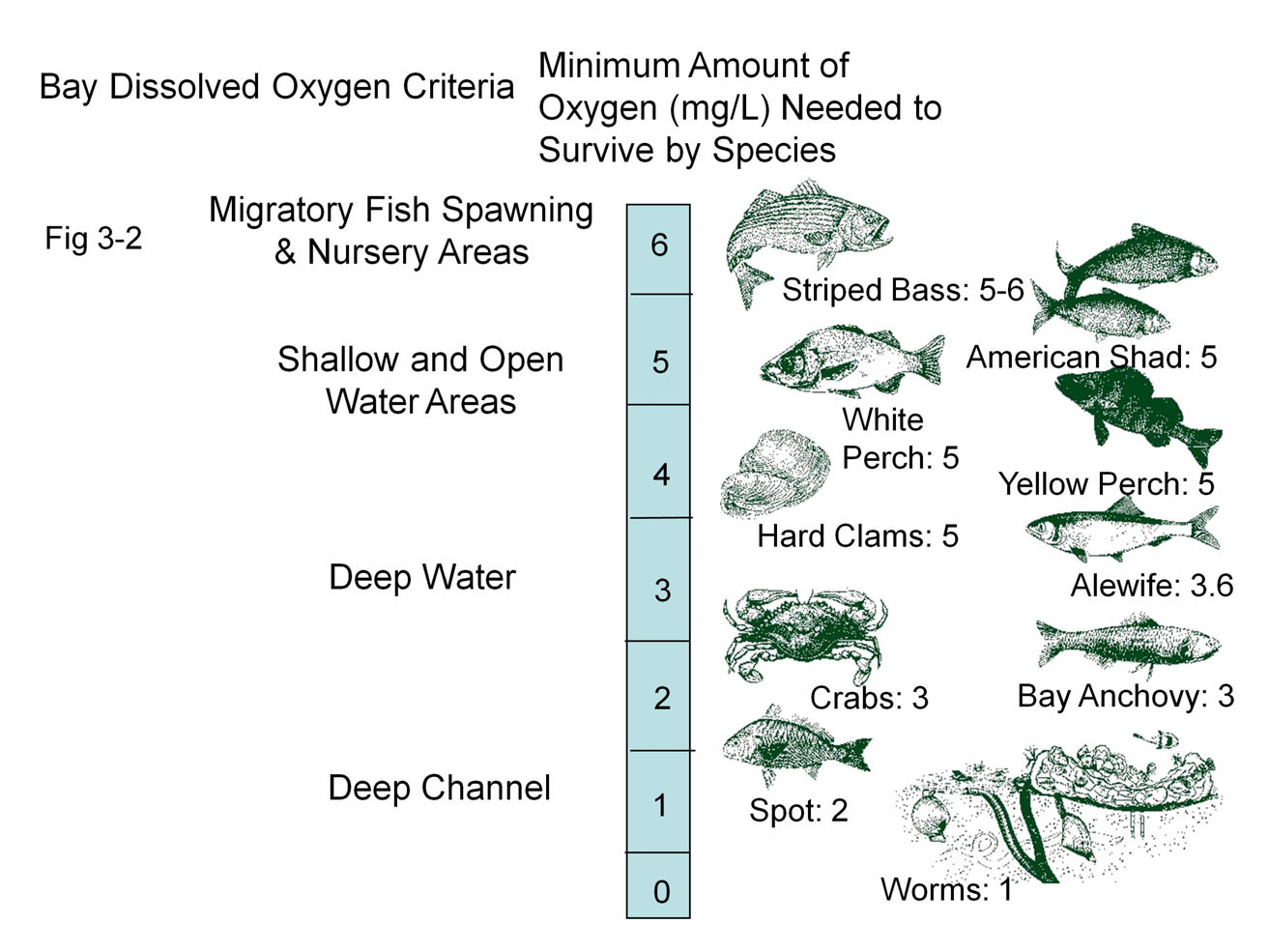
Dissolved oxygen levels required by various species in Chesapeake Bay

According to the National Geographic, the Chesapeake Bay was one of the first hypoxic zones to be identified in the 1970s. The Chesapeake Bay experiences seasonal hypoxia due to high nitrogen levels. These nitrogen levels are caused by urbanization, there are multiple factories that pollute the atmosphere with nitrogen, and agriculture, the opposite side of the bay is used for poultry farming, which produces a lot of manure that ends up running off into the Chesapeake Bay.

From 1985–2019, there were efforts from the caretakers of Chesapeake Bay to reduce the annual hypoxic volumes. There was significant improvement in 2016–2017 that gave assurance to the caretakers that the efforts were successful, however recent data has shown that further efforts are needed to continuously curb the effects of global warming.

==== Elizabeth River, Virginia ====
The Elizabeth River estuary is used for commercial and military use and is one of the most commonly used ports on the East Coast of the USA. From 2015-2019, 11 different conditions were measured in various areas of the Elizabeth River. Throughout the river, there were consistently high levels of nitrogen and phosphorus, along with high levels of other contaminants contributing to the poor quality of life for bottom feeders along the river. The main cause of the pollution to the Elizabeth river has been the military and industrial activities through the 1990s. In 1993, the Elizabeth River Project was started in attempt to do a restoration project on the river. Adopting one of the fish whose species had been largely impacted by the pollution, the Fundulus heteroclitus (Mummichog), the group was able to gain traction and carry out multiple projects and has removed thousands of tons of contaminated sediment. In 2006, Maersk-APM, a major shipping company, wanted to build a new port on the Elizabeth River. As part of the environmental mitigation they worked with the Elizabeth River Project to create the Money Point Project, which was an effort to restore Money Point, which had been deemed biologically depleted due to a black tar like substance called creosote laying at the bottom. Maersk-APM gave $5 million to help get the project up and running. By 2012, they were able to restore over 7 acres of tidal marsh, 3 acres of oyster reef and created a new shoreline. In 2019, the Money Point Project received the "Best Restored Shore" award from the American Shore and Beach Preservation Association.

=== Lake Erie ===
A seasonal dead zone exists in the central part of Lake Erie from east of Point Pelee to Long Point and stretches to shores in Canada and the United States. Between the months of July and October the dead zone has the ability to grow to the size of 10,000 square kilometers. Lake Erie has an excess of phosphorus due to agricultural runoff that quickens the growth of algae which then contributes to hypoxic conditions. The superabundance of phosphorus in the lake has been linked to nonpoint source pollution such as urban and agricultural runoff as well as point source pollution that includes sewage and wastewater treatment plants. The zone was first noticed in the 1960s amid the peak of eutrophication occurring in the lake. After public concern increased, Canada and the US launched efforts to reduce runoff pollution into the lake in the 1970s as means to reverse the dead zone growth. Scientists in 2018 stated that phosphorus runoff would have to further decrease by 40% to avoid the emergence of the dead zones in the area. The commercial and recreational fishing industry have been significantly impacted by the hypoxic zone. In 2021, the low-oxygenated waters caused a mass-kill event of freshwater drum fish species (also known as sheepshead fish). Water from the lake is also used for human drinking. Water from the lake has been said to acquire a pervasive odor and discoloration when the dead zone is active in the late summer months.

=== Lower St. Lawrence Estuary ===
A dead zone exists in the Lower St. Lawrence River area from east the Saguenay River to east of Baie Comeau, greatest at depths over 275 metres (902 ft) and noticed since the 1930s. The main concern for Canadian scientists is the impact on fish found in the area.

=== Oregon ===
There is a hypoxic zone covering the coasts of Oregon and Washington that reached peak size in 2006 at an area of over 1,158 square miles. Strong surface winds between April and September cause frequent upwelling that results in an increase of algae blooms, rendering the hypoxia a seasonal occurrence. The upwelling has contributed to lower temperatures within the zone. The dead zone has resulted in sea organisms such as crabs and fish relocating and an interference with commercial fishing. Organisms that cannot relocate have been found to suffocate, leaving them useless for fishermen. In 2009, one scientist described "thousands and thousands" of suffocated, crabs, worms, and sea stars along the seafloor of the hypoxic zone. In 2021, 1.9 million dollars were put into monitoring and continuing to study the hypoxic conditions in the area that the dead zone occurs in.

=== Gulf of Mexico 'dead zone' ===
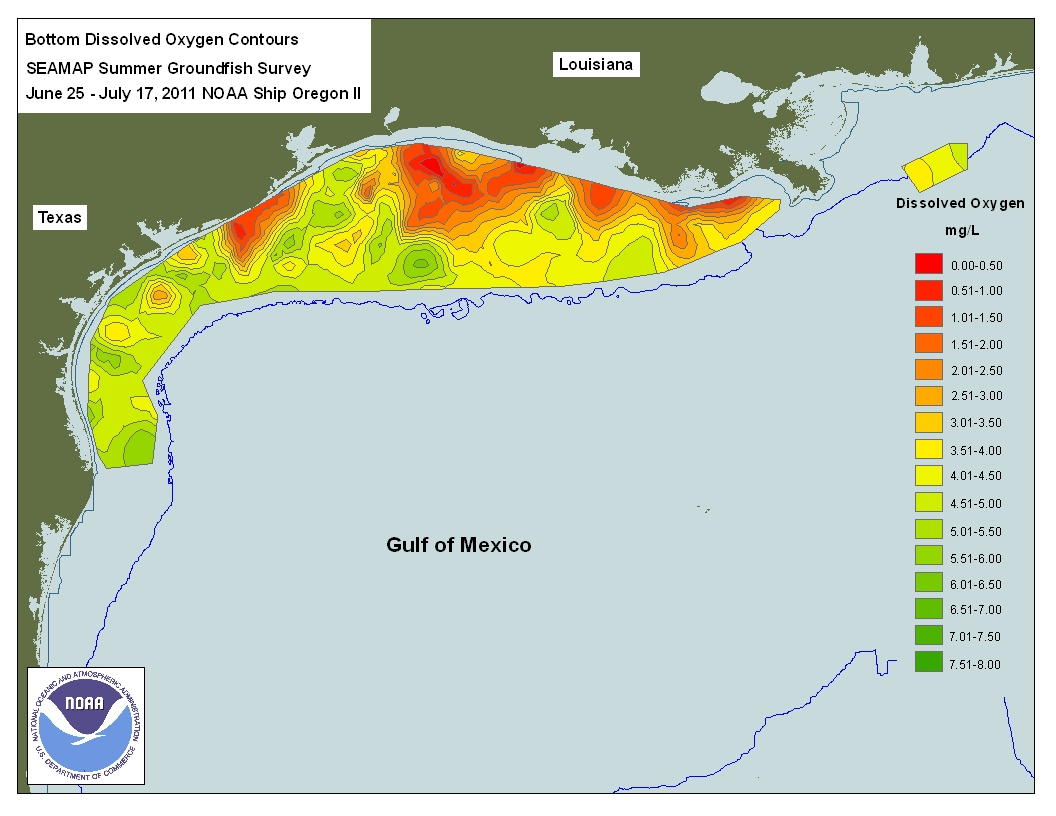
Dead zone along an extensive portion in the Gulf of Mexico

The area of temporary hypoxic bottom water that occurs most summers off the coast of Louisiana in the Gulf of Mexico is the largest recurring hypoxic zone in the United States. It occurs only during the summer months of the year due to summer warming, regional circulation, wind mixing and high freshwater discharge. The Mississippi River, which is the drainage area for 41% of the continental United States, dumps high-nutrient runoff such as nitrates and phosphorus into the Gulf of Mexico. According to a 2009 fact sheet created by NOAA, "seventy percent of nutrient loads that cause hypoxia are a result of this vast drainage basin", which includes the heart of U.S. agribusiness, the Midwest. The discharge of treated sewage from urban areas (pop. c 12 million in 2009) combined with agricultural runoff deliver c. 1.7 million tons of phosphorus and nitrogen into the Gulf of Mexico every year. Nitrogen is indeed needed to increase crop yields, but plants are inefficient at taking it up, and often more fertilizers are used than plants actually need. Therefore, only a percentage of applied nitrogen ends up in the crops; and in some areas that number is less than 20%. Even though Iowa occupies less than 5% of the Mississippi River drainage basin, average annual nitrate discharge from surface water in Iowa is about 204,000 to 222,000 metric tonnes, or 25% of all the nitrate that the Mississippi River delivers to the Gulf of Mexico. Export from the Raccoon River Watershed is among the highest in the United States, with annual yields at 26.1 kg/ha/year, which ranked as the highest loss of nitrate out of 42 Mississippi subwatersheds evaluated for a Gulf of Mexico hypoxia report. In 2012, Iowa introduced the Iowa Nutrient Reduction Strategy, which "is a science and technology-based framework to assess and reduce nutrients to Iowa waters and the Gulf of Mexico. It is designed to direct efforts to reduce nutrients in surface water from both point and nonpoint sources in a scientific, reasonable and cost effective manner." The strategy continues to evolve, using voluntary methods to reduce Iowa's negative contributions through outreach, research, and implementation of nutrient holding practices. In order to help reduce agricultural runoff into the Mississippi Basin, Minnesota passed MN Statute 103F.48 in 2015, also known as the "Buffer Law", which was designed to implement mandatory riparian buffers between farmland and public waterways across the State of Minnesota. The Minnesota Board of Water and Soil Resources (BWSR) issued a January 2019 report stating that compliance with the 'Buffer Law' has reached 99%.

==== Size ====
The area of hypoxic bottom water that occurs for several weeks each summer in the Gulf of Mexico has been mapped most years from 1985 through 2024. The size varies annually from a record high in 2017 when it encompassed more than 22,730 square kilometers (8,776 square miles) to a record low in 1988 of 39 square kilometers (15 square miles). The 2015 dead zone measured 16,760 square kilometers (6,474 square miles). Nancy Rabalais of the Louisiana Universities Marine Consortium in Cocodrie, Louisiana, predicted the dead zone or hypoxic zone in 2012 will cover an area of 17,353 square kilometers (6,700 square miles) which is larger than Connecticut; however, when the measurements were completed, the area of hypoxic bottom water in 2012 only totaled 7,480 square kilometers. The models using the nitrogen flux from the Mississippi River to predict the "dead zone" areas have been criticized for being systematically high from 2006 to 2014, having predicted record areas in 2007, 2008, 2009, 2011, and 2013 that were never realized.

In late summer 1988 the dead zone disappeared as the great drought caused the flow of Mississippi to fall to its lowest level since 1933. During times of heavy flooding in the Mississippi River Basin, as in 1993, "the 'dead zone' dramatically increased in size, approximately 5,000 km (3,107 mi) larger than the previous year". In July 2026, Tropical Storm Bertha decreased the size of the dead zone significantly through mixing hypoxic and oxygenated layers in the sea.

==== Economic impact ====
Some assert that the dead zone threatens lucrative commercial and recreational fisheries in the Gulf of Mexico. "In 2009, the dockside value of commercial fisheries in the Gulf was $629 million. Nearly three million recreational fishers further contributed about $10 billion to the Gulf economy, taking 22 million fishing trips." The seafood production is not only hurting states located on the Gulf of Mexico but the U.S. as a whole. It is reported that the Gulf of Mexico dead zone is costing the U.S. seafood and tourism industries about $82 million a year. Louisiana is ranked second in seafood production behind Alaska, and this impact can be devastating for the nations seafood production since the Gulf of Mexico sources 40% of the nations seafood. Scientists are not in universal agreement that nutrient loading has a negative impact on fisheries. Grimes makes a case that nutrient loading enhances the fisheries in the Gulf of Mexico. Courtney et al. hypothesize that nutrient loading may have contributed to the increases in red snapper in the northern and western Gulf of Mexico.

In 2017, Tulane University offered a $1 million challenge grant for growing crops with less fertilizer.

==== History ====
Shrimp trawlers first reported a 'dead zone' in the Gulf of Mexico in 1950, but it was not until 1970 when the size of the hypoxic zone had increased that scientists began to investigate.

After 1950, the conversion of forests and wetlands for agricultural and urban developments accelerated. "Missouri River Basin has had hundreds of thousands of acres of forests and wetlands (66,000,000 acres) replaced with agriculture activity [. . .] In the Lower Mississippi one-third of the valley's forests were converted to agriculture between 1950 and 1976."

In July 2007, a dead zone was discovered off the coast of Texas where the Brazos River empties into the Gulf.

=== Korea ===
==== Jinhae Bay ====
Jinhae Bay is the first of Korea's two major dead zones. Hypoxia was first reported in Jinhae Bay in September 1974. In 2011, a joint study was done to observe and record causes, effects, and what can be done about Korea's hypoxic zones. It was discovered that Jinhae Bay exhibits a seasonal dead zone from early June to late September. This dead zone is caused by "domestic and land use waste and thermal stratification". Jinhae Bay experiences hypoxia largely at the bottom of its bay. The ratio of phosphorus to nitrogen is imbalanced at the bottom, where it is otherwise balanced at the top, with the exception of early June to late September where the Bay experiences eutrophication as a whole. The effects of Jinhae Bay's hypoxia is seen in the marine system surrounding Korea, with a loss of biological diversity, particularly of the calcareous shelled organisms.

==== Shihwa Bay ====
Shihwa Bay is a coastal reservoir created in 1994 to supply surrounding agricultural lands with water, and act as a run-off lake for nearby industrial plants. The Bay was made without much environmental consideration, and by 1999, water quality saw a significant drop. This drop in water quality is attributed to the bay not having enough circulation or new water flow to accommodate the domestic and industrial waste being dumped. In response, the Korean government set up a pollution management system within the bay, and has installed a gate system that allows the Bay to mix with water from the sea. Shihwa Bay is also experiencing an imbalance of phosphorus to nitrogen, but also large influxes of ammonium.

== Energy Independence and Security Act of 2007 ==
The Energy Independence and Security Act of 2007 calls for the production of 36 billion US gallons (140,000,000 m^{3}) of renewable fuels by 2022, including 15 billion US gallons (57,000,000 m^{3}) of corn-based ethanol, a tripling of current production that would require a similar increase in corn production. Unfortunately, the plan poses a new problem; the increase in demand for corn production results in a proportional increase in nitrogen runoff. Although nitrogen, which makes up 78% of the Earth's atmosphere, is an inert gas, it has more reactive forms, two of which (nitrate and ammonia) are used to make fertilizer.

According to Fred Below, a professor of crop physiology at the University of Illinois at Urbana-Champaign, corn requires more nitrogen-based fertilizer because it produces a higher grain per unit area than other crops and, unlike other crops, corn is completely dependent on available nitrogen in soil. The results, reported March 18, 2008, in Proceedings of the National Academy of Sciences, showed that scaling up corn production to meet the 15-billion-US-gallon (57,000,000 m^{3}) goal would increase nitrogen loading in the Dead Zone by 10–18%. This would boost nitrogen levels to twice the level recommended by the Mississippi Basin/Gulf of Mexico Water Nutrient Task Force (Mississippi River Watershed Conservation Programs), a coalition of federal, state, and tribal agencies that have monitored the dead zone since 1997. The task force says a 30% reduction of nitrogen runoff is needed if the dead zone is to shrink.

== Reversal ==
The recovery of benthic communities primarily depends upon the length and severity of hypoxic conditions inside the zone. Less severe conditions and temporary depletion of oxygen allow rapid recovery of benthic communities in the area due to reestablishment by benthic larvae from adjacent areas, with longer conditions of hypoxia and more severe oxygen depletion leading to longer reestablishment periods. Recovery also depends upon stratification levels within the area, so heavily stratified areas in warmer waters are less likely to recover from anoxic or hypoxic conditions in addition to being more susceptible to eutrophication driven hypoxia. The difference in recovery ability and susceptibility to hypoxia in stratified marine environments is expected to complicate recovery efforts of dead zones in the future as ocean warming continues.

Small scale hypoxic systems with rich surrounding communities are the most likely to recover after nutrient influxes leading to eutrophication stop. However, depending on the extent of damage and characteristics of the zone, large scale hypoxic condition could also potentially recover after a period of a decade. For example, the Black Sea dead zone, previously the largest in the world, largely disappeared between 1991 and 2001 after fertilizers became too costly to use following the collapse of the Soviet Union and the demise of centrally planned economies in Eastern and Central Europe. Fishing has again become a major economic activity in the region.

While the Black Sea "cleanup" was largely unintentional and involved a drop in hard-to-control fertilizer usage, the U.N. has advocated other cleanups by reducing large industrial emissions. From 1985 to 2000, the North Sea dead zone had nitrogen reduced by 37% when policy efforts by countries on the Rhine River reduced sewage and industrial emissions of nitrogen into the water. Other cleanups have taken place along the Hudson River and San Francisco Bay.

== Biotechnology Application ==
There are some options that can aid in the reversal process of a dead zone and eventual recovery of water quality and benthic communities through applied biotechnology methodology if a given management project can apply it if the conditions of a dead-zone fit within the criteria. One of the more natural options is established filter feeding species within a marine community that are nearby a impacted ecological area transitioned into a dead zone that can then spread and possibly establish a population there in which recovery time can vary as they filter out access nitrogen and phosphorus. Given that many filter feeding species have different tolerance levels due to the extreme hypoxic conditions, it can be determined through research of how various species respond behaviorally to those specific conditions and deduce the most appropriate species based on a dead-zone of interest to recover. An 8-day study was done on eastern oysters (Crassostrea virginica) and soft-shell clams (Mya arenaria) to assess their reactions to hypoxic and heatwave conditions. While this study was meant for establishing an understanding of behavioral patterns in warming conditions for filter-feeding species, this type of approach can be conducted on other filter-feeding species to assess their potential as a significant part of the recovery process for select dead-sea communities for potential introduction.

An additional approach is establishing dedicated biofilter zones within a dead-zone area to trigger the recovery process in a faster and more controlled environment to enable the management recovery process in a stronger way. A long-term study was executed in response to rising concerns in nitrogen pollution in marine ecosystems, so a anammox bio filter reactor was made for this study to assess bacterial nitrogen removal capabilities. "Anammox efficiently converts two pivotal nitrogen compounds, NH4+ (electron donor) and NO2− (electron acceptor), into dinitrogen gas, circumventing the limitations of conventional nitrification–denitrification pathways. This makes it one of the most cost-effective and efficient methods for biological nitrogen removal (Zhu et al., 2023)." Overall it was present that when dead zones would emerge, biofilms would trigger these nitrogen-removing bacteria through signal molecule regulation and microbial succession to adapt to environmental stress and maintain long-term bio filter reactor stability.

Biomineralization is a pretty effective biotechnical approach as well, as the way it works is organic matter pulls in inorganic matter/nutrients through a process that forms mineral structures. This process is most commonly bio-technically executed using micro-organisms for a wide variety of uses. However it can be induced in several ways as the way it interacts in a marine environment with microorganisms is mainly pulling in phosphorus and carbon and crystalizing, once it reaches a certain weight it make sink and or able to be collected using wastewater management procedures. This study used a anaerobic membrane bioreactor combined with iron-induced biomineralization to treat swine wastewater which proved to be highly successful. Put this in a dead-zone context and implementing biomineralization by inducing it in whichever way best fits as it doesn't just have to be phosphorus, it can be nitrogen or carbon focused biomineralization depending on how the method is executed which can then make the clean-up recovery process of access phosphorus in a dead-zone easier to clean. These biotechnology application prompts have not been executed as dedicated applications to aid in the recovery process of a dead-zone but there is potential as more research is put into some of these types of techniques and their success is measured over time.

== Modelling ==
Mathematical and computational models are a critical component in the study of dead zones. Using these models with dead zones will help policy makers predict the impacts various factors have when it comes to dead zones. Modelling has been used to take nutrient inputs (nitrogen and phosphorus) across water bodies then predicts what the inputs will do in regaurds to algal blooms and oxygen depletion. There is also modelling in dead zones utilizing prediction skills by inserting nitrogen and phosphorus application to a field and predicts the runoff and nutrient leaching amounts that will occur in the nearby water bodies.

== See also ==
- Algal bloom – Spread of planktonic algae in water
- Anoxic event – Historic oxygen depletion events in Earth's oceans
- Anoxic waters – Areas of seawater, freshwater, or groundwater that are depleted of dissolved oxygen
- Cultural eutrophication – Accumulation of nutrients in water
- Desert – Area of land where little precipitation occurs
- Eutrophication – Accumulation of nutrients in water
- Fish kill – Localized die-off of fish populations
- Hypoxia – Low oxygen conditions or levels
- Marine pollution – Pollution of oceans from substances discarded by humans
- Ocean deoxygenation – Reduction of the oxygen content of the oceans
- Oxygen minimum zone – Zone in which oxygen saturation in seawater in the ocean is at its lowest
- Shutdown of thermohaline circulation – System of surface and deep currents in the Atlantic Ocean
