= Lesch =

Lesch is a surname. Notable people with the surname include:

- Carl Lesch, American Roman Catholic educator
- Gabriela Lesch, German runner
- George Henry Lesch, American businessman
- Harald Lesch, German physicist
- John Lesch, American politician
- Karin Lesch, Swiss-German actress
- Klaus-Peter Lesch, German psychiatrist
- Michael Lesch, Jewish American physician and medical educator
- Willi Lesch, German alpine skier

== See also ==
- Lesh, a surname and given name
- Lesch, the former German name for Leșu, a commune in Bistrița-Năsăud County, Transylvania, Romania
