= Boreomysis sibogae =

Scientific classification
- Domain: Eukaryota
- Kingdom: Animalia
- Phylum: Arthropoda
- Class: Malacostraca
- Order: Mysida
- Family: Mysidae
- Genus: Boreomysis
- Species: B. sibogae

Binomial name
- Boreomysis sibogae Hansen, 1910

Synonyms
- Boreomysis spinifera Coifmann, 1937

Species of mysid crustaceans

Boreomysis sibogae is a species of mysid crustaceans from the subfamily Boreomysinae (family Mysidae). It is also a member of the nominotypical subgenus Boreomysis sensu stricto. The species is an epi-bathypelagic mysid, widely distributed in the Indo-Pacific and possibly also in the Atlantic Ocean.

== Taxonomic History ==
In 1899, an immature male and two immature females were collected from Banda Sea near Manipa Island during the Dutch Siboga expedition in the Indonesian Archipelago (station 185). The material went to a Danish zoologist Hans Jacob Hansen, who shortly described a new species Boreomysis sibogae in 1910. The three syntypes are deposited in the Naturalis Biodiversity Center, Leiden.

In 1937 I. Coifmann described a small male with long eye papilla and long terminal spiniform setae of telson from the Gulf of Aden in the Northwest Indian Ocean under the name Boreomysis spinifera. In 1955 it was synonymised with B. sibogae by O. S. Tattersall. This was not supported by C. Holmquist, and J. A. Birstein with J. G. Tchindonova. However, the specimens they dealt with had the dilatation of the telson cleft, and thus did not belong to neither B. sibogae, nor to B. spinifera, but most probably to B. sphaerops. The synonymisation was supported by all subsequent workers, though the species is still considered taxonomically difficult due to immaturity of the types, poor preservation and great variability. In 2023 the species became a member of the subgenus Boreomysis.

== Description ==
Body length of adults is 13–38 mm. Anterior margin of the carapace has a short pointed rostrum, with smoothly rounded lateral margins, not produced into angles like in B. (B.) inopinata and B. (B.) sphaerops. In juveniles the rostrum can be rather long, similar to B. (B.) brucei and B. (B.) intermedia.

The telson does not have the dilatation. It is longer than the last abdominal segment, 3.0–3.4 times longer than wide and its posterior width being about 0.6 of the anterior. Lateral margins of the telson having up to 60 spiniform setae in groups of several short and one long setae. Apical spiniform setae of telson numbering three. Telson cleft is 0.20–0.25 of the entire telson length, which is somewhat deeper than in the close relative B. (B.) californica, with up to 85 long spinules.

Like in other members of the subgenus Boreomysis, the slightly flattened eyes of B. (B.) sibogae are large or moderate in size, but never dominating over the stalk, and bear papilla, which is quite variable from small to rather long. Antennal scale is relatively broad (4.7–5.5 times as long as wide), with apical part not produced beyond the outer spine. By this the species additionally differs from B. (B.) brucei, B. (B.) californica and B. (B.) intermedia, in which the apical part is produced beyond the spine. In juveniles of B. sibogae, however, this part of the antennal scale can be slightly produced, making the relationship between the four taxa rather confusing.

Pereopod propodus is 2-segmented, like in majority of the species in the subgenus. Uropodal endopod has zero to two spiniform setae. Uropodal exopod segment 1 is 0.20–0.27 of the entire length of the exopod, with two spiniform setae.

== Distribution ==
Boreomysis sibogae has been recorded across the Indo-Pacific region: from Northwest Pacific to the Southern Ocean, from the Northwest Indian Ocean to Indonesia and the Tasman Sea. There are doubtful records also from the Atlantic.

== Habitat ==
Unlike most of boreomysines B. sibogae was occasionally recorded in epipelagic zone at depth of 50-200 m. Most of findings are still deeper than 1000 m (down to 5000 m). The type material was infested by a dajid isopod Streptodajus equilibrans.
