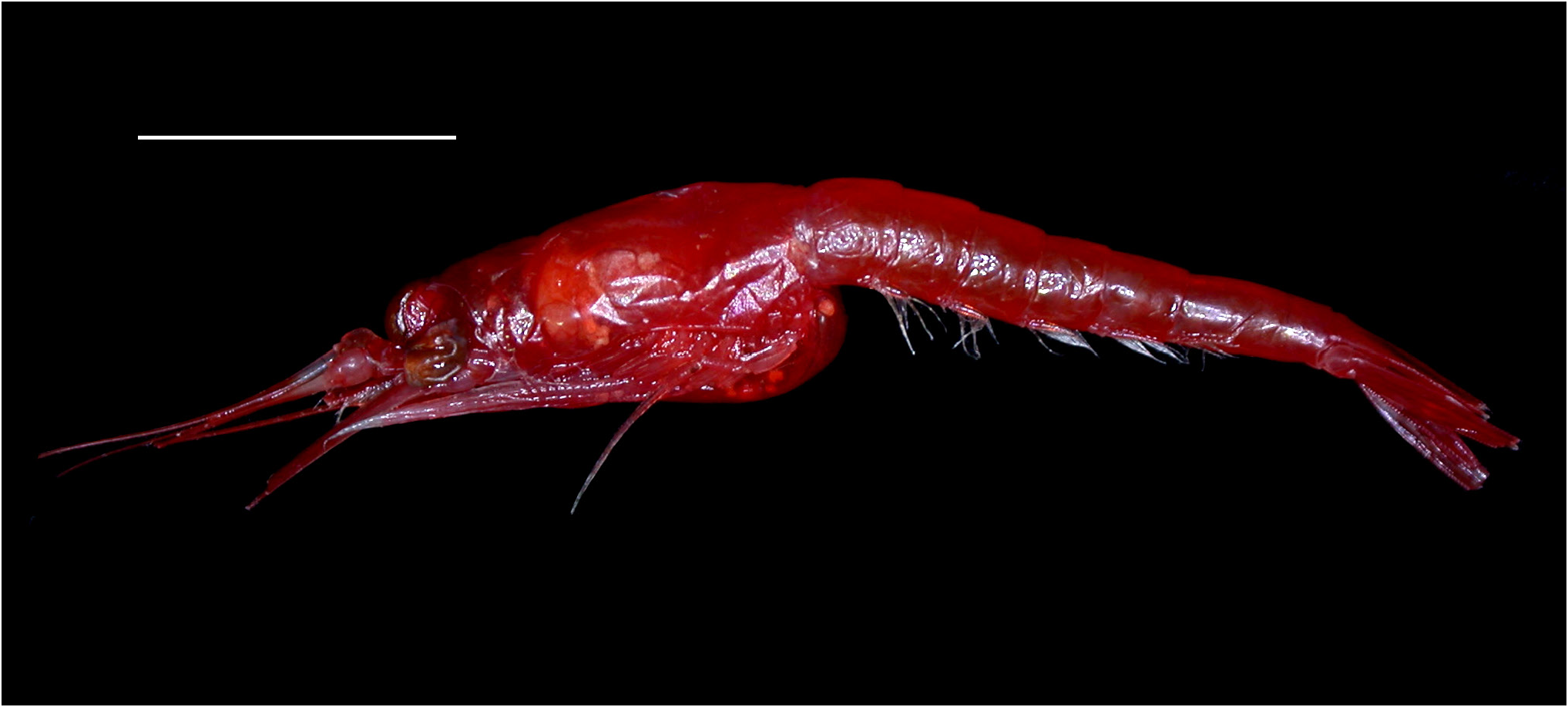

Scientific classification
- Domain: Eukaryota
- Kingdom: Animalia
- Phylum: Arthropoda
- Class: Malacostraca
- Order: Mysida
- Family: Mysidae
- Genus: Boreomysis
- Species: B. urospina

Binomial name
- Boreomysis urospina Daneliya, 2023

= Boreomysis urospina =

Species of mysid crustaceans

Boreomysis urospina is a species of mysid crustacean from the subfamily Boreomysinae (family Mysidae). It is also a member of the subgenus Petryashovia. The species is a mesopelagic mysid, found only in the Tasman Sea, off Australia.

== Taxonomy ==
The first 23 specimens of B. urospina were collected off Tasmania in the Huon Commonwealth Marine Reserve at the depth of 1046–1070 m in 2015 during the research cruise of RV Investigator. Many more specimens were pulled up onboard of the same vessel in 2018 from 919 to 1086 m off Tasmania. The entire collection became the base for the original description in Finland in 2023. The material is deposited at the Australian Museum.

The species name represents an adjective, formed from the New Latin prefix uro-, i.e. tail, with the reference to the uropods, and the Latin word spina, meaning a spine. This is a reference to the increased number of the uropodal spiniform setae, and also to the unique position of the spiniform setae of the exopod, being nearly at the half of the ramus.

== Description ==
The body length of males is 33–36 mm, of females 35–40 mm. Color is uniformly red. Compared to other members of the genus Boreomysis B. urospina possesses a minute concavity on the lateral sides of the carapace anterior margin, and the proximal segment of the uropodal exopod is nearly half as long as the ramus. Compared to other species of the subgenus Petryashovia B. urospina has the widest uropodal exopod, which is about five times as long as wide, with three spiniform setae; and the endopod having three to five spiniform setae.

The most similar species within the subgenus is B. (P.) megalops. In addition to the unique features B. urospina differs from it also by the longer antennal scales, which are more than twice as long as the antennular peduncle and about five times as long as wide, unmodified pleopod 2 of male and the larger number of the telson terminal spiniform setae (four).

The telson length is 1.04–1.4 times the length of the abdominal segment 6, 2.9–3.5 times longer than wide, with its posterior width being 0.55–0.60 of the anterior width. Lateral sides are nearly straight, with 22–26 spiniform setae, which are nearly equal in length. The longest terminal spiniform setae are two to four times as long as the flanking ones. The cleft is 0.16–0.20 of the entire telson, without dilatation.

The eyes are extremely large, with the cornea dominating over the stalk, lacking papilla.

== Distribution and habitat ==
Boreomysis urospina is known only from the southern Tasman Sea south of Tasmania. The species takes an intermediate position between meso- and bathypelagic species. Found at the depth of 919-1086m, it is the most deep water member of the subgenus.
