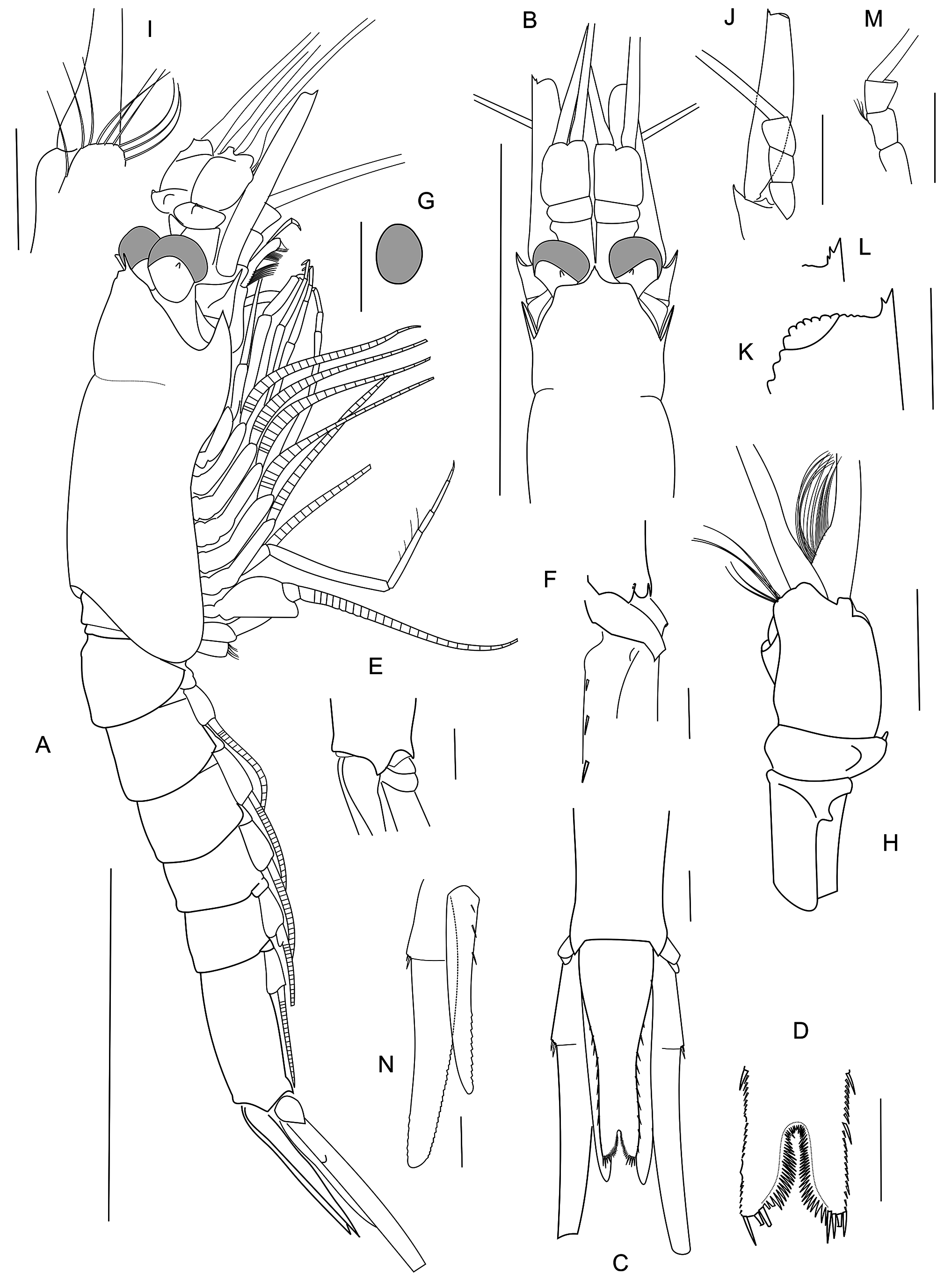

Scientific classification
- Domain: Eukaryota
- Kingdom: Animalia
- Phylum: Arthropoda
- Class: Malacostraca
- Order: Mysida
- Family: Mysidae
- Genus: Boreomysis
- Species: B. inopinata

Binomial name
- Boreomysis inopinata Daneliya, 2023

= Boreomysis inopinata =

Species of mysid crustaceans

Boreomysis inopinata is a species of mysid crustaceans from the subfamily Boreomysinae (family Mysidae). It is also a member of the nominotypical subgenus Boreomysis sensu stricto. The species is a deepwater bathypelagic mysid, found only from the Tasman Sea off Australia.

== History of discovery ==
First two specimens of B. inopinata were collected off Tasmania in the Huon Commonwealth Marine Reserve at the depth of 1060 m in 2015 during the research cruise of RV Investigator. Another juvenile was pulled up onboard of the same vessel in 2017 from the greater depth of 2324–2634 m in the Central Eastern Commonwealth Marine Reserve off New South Wales. In 2018 still another, albeit large series was collected again off Tasmania near Punch's Hill at 919–1086 m depth. The entire collection became the base for the original description in Finland in 2023. The material is deposited at the Australian Museum.

== Etymology ==
The species was discovered to have an uncommon for mysids additional armature on the antennal scale outer spine. The Latin name inopinata means unexpected, to refer to the unusual morphology.

== Description ==
Body length of adults is 28.5–32 mm. Its characteristic anterior margin of the carapace has a pointed rostrum with somewhat emerging smoothly rounded lateral angles. Similar anterior margin is also found in Boreomysis (Boreomysis) sphaerops, in which the rostrum is rather short, and Boreomysis (Boreomysis) tridens, in which the lateral angles are acutely or bluntly pointed. The telson does not have the dilatation, found in B. (B.) sphaerops. It is longer than the last abdominal segment, 2.6–2.9 times longer than wide and its posterior width being about 0.6 of the anterior. Lateral margins of the telson having up to 60 spiniform setae in groups of numerous short and one long setae. Apical spiniform setae of telson numbering three or four. Telson cleft is 0.15–0.17 of the entire telson length with up to 60 long spinules.

Like in other members of the subgenus Boreomysis, the oval eyes of B. (B.) inopinata are moderate in size and bear papilla, which is quite small. Narrow antennal scale (4.7–5.5 times as long as wide) is uniquely armed in this species, with outer spine bearing additional one to four spinules.

Pereopod propodus is 2-segmented, like in majority of the species in the subgenus. Pleopod 3 of male is distally with strong setae, while pleopod 4 in not modified. Uropodal endopod has two or three spiniform setae. Uropodal exopod segment 1 is 0.27–0.30 of the entire length of the exopod, with two spiniform setae.

== Distribution and habitat ==
The species is known only from the Tasman Sea near the Australian coast. Bathypelagic at depth of 919–2634 m.

== Phylogeny ==
Boreomysis inopinata is most similar to B.(B.) sphaerops and B.(B.) tridens. The former species is also recorded in the Tasman Sea, and the initial genetic analysis seems to support the affinity to it.
