= Mysidopsis =

Scientific classification
- Kingdom: Animalia
- Phylum: Arthropoda
- Clade: Pancrustacea
- Class: Malacostraca
- Order: Mysida
- Family: Mysidae
- Subfamily: Leptomysinae
- Genus: Mysidopsis; G.O. Sars, 1864

Species
- See text

Genus of crustaceans

Mysidopsis is a genus of mysid shrimps in the family Mysidae. The sensitivity of these shrimps to water quality makes them suitable for bioassays. Mysidopsis bahia and Mysidopsis almyra, which are used frequently to test for pesticides and other toxic substances, are now classified as Americamysis bahia and Americamysis almyra.

== Species ==
The World Register of Marine Species lists the following species:

- Mysidopsis acuta Hansen, 1913
- Mysidopsis angusta G.O. Sars, 1864
- Mysidopsis ankeli Brattegard, 1973
- Mysidopsis arenosa Brattegard, 1974
- Mysidopsis badius Modlin, 1987
- Mysidopsis bispinosa O. Tattersall, 1969
- Mysidopsis bispinulata Brattegard, 1974
- Mysidopsis brattegarti Băcescu & Gleye, 1979
- Mysidopsis brattstroemi Brattegard, 1969
- Mysidopsis buffaloensis Wooldridge, 1988
- Mysidopsis cachuchoensis San Vicente, Frutos & Sorbe, 2012
- Mysidopsis californica W. Tattersall, 1932
- Mysidopsis camelina O. Tattersall, 1955
- Mysidopsis cathengelae Gleye, 1982
- Mysidopsis coelhoi Băcescu, 1968
- Mysidopsis coralicola Băcescu, 1975
- Mysidopsis cultrata Brattegard, 1973
- Mysidopsis didelphys (Norman, 1863)
- Mysidopsis eclipes Brattegard, 1969
- Mysidopsis eremita O. Tattersall, 1962
- Mysidopsis furca Bowman, 1957
- Mysidopsis gibbosa G.O. Sars, 1864
- Mysidopsis hellvillensis Nouvel, 1964
- Mysidopsis iluroensis San Vicente, 2013
- Mysidopsis indica W. Tattersall, 1922
- Mysidopsis intii Holmquist, 1957
- Mysidopsis japonica Ii, 1964
- Mysidopsis juniae da Silva, 1979
- Mysidopsis kempi W. Tattersall, 1922
- Mysidopsis kenyana Băcescu & Vasilescu, 1973
- Mysidopsis lata Bravo & Murano, 1996
- Mysidopsis major (Zimmer, 1928)
- Mysidopsis mathewsoni Brattegard, 1969
- Mysidopsis mauchlinei Brattegard, 1974
- Mysidopsis mortenseni W. Tattersall, 1951
- Mysidopsis oligocenicus De Angeli & Rossi, 2006
- Mysidopsis onofrensis Băcescu & Gleye, 1979
- Mysidopsis rionegrensis Hoffmeyer, 1993
- Mysidopsis robusta Brattegard, 1974
- Mysidopsis robustispina Brattegard, 1969
- Mysidopsis sankarankuttyi Băcescu, 1984
- Mysidopsis schultzei (Zimmer, 1928)
- Mysidopsis scintilae dos Reis & da Silva, 1987
- Mysidopsis similis (Zimmer, 1912)
- Mysidopsis suedafrikana O. Tattersall, 1969
- Mysidopsis surugae Murano, 1970
- Mysidopsis tortonesei Băcescu, 1968
- Mysidopsis velifera Brattegard, 1973
- Mysidopsis virgulata Brattegard, 1974
