= Victor Vladimirovich Petryashov =

Russian zoologist, carcinologist, hydrobiologist, and biogeographer (1956–2018)

- Born: 6 March 1956; Nyandoma, Arkhangelsk Oblast
- Died: 2 July 2018 (aged 62); Saint Petersburg
- Education: Candidate of Science (1990)
- Alma mater: Leningrad State University
- Scientific career
- Fields: Zoology, Biogeography, Hydrobiology
- Workplaces: Zoological Institute of RAS

Victor Vladimirovich Petryashov (16 March 1956 - 2 July 2018) was a Russian zoologist, carcinologist, hydrobiologist and biogeographer. His scientific research focused on taxonomy and distribution of malacostracan crustaceans, particularly orders Mysida, Lophogastrida and Leptostraca, and marine biogeography and hydrobiology of Arctic, Antarctic and temperate seas of the World, and he published over 120 works. V.V. Petryashov spent all his professional life in St. Petersburg in the Zoological Institute of the Russian Academy of Sciences. As a senior researcher he also curated the malacostracan crustacean collection of the Zoological Institute.

== Named taxa ==
Mysida:

- Paracanthomysis shikhotaniensis Petrjashov, 1983
- Stylomysis arcticoglacialis (Petryashov, 1990) (originally Mysis arcticoglacialis Petryashov, 1990)
- Michthyops arcticus Petryashov, 1993
- Meterythrops muranous Petryashov, 2015
- Stellamblyops Petryashov et Frutos, 2017
- Stellamblyops vassilenkoae Petryashov et Frutos, 2017

Lophogastrida:

- Neognathophausia Petryashov, 1992
- Fagegnathophausia Petryashov, 2015

Leptostraca:

- Pseudonebaliopsis Petryashov, 1996
- Pseudonebaliopsis atlantica Petryashov, 1996
- Sarsinebalia pseudotyphlops Petryashov, 2016
- Nebaliella kurila Petryashov, 2016
- Nebaliella ochotica Petryashov, 2017

== Taxa dedicated to V.V. Petryashov ==
Boreomysis (Petryashovia) Daneliya, 2023 (Mysida: Mysidae: Boreomysinae)
