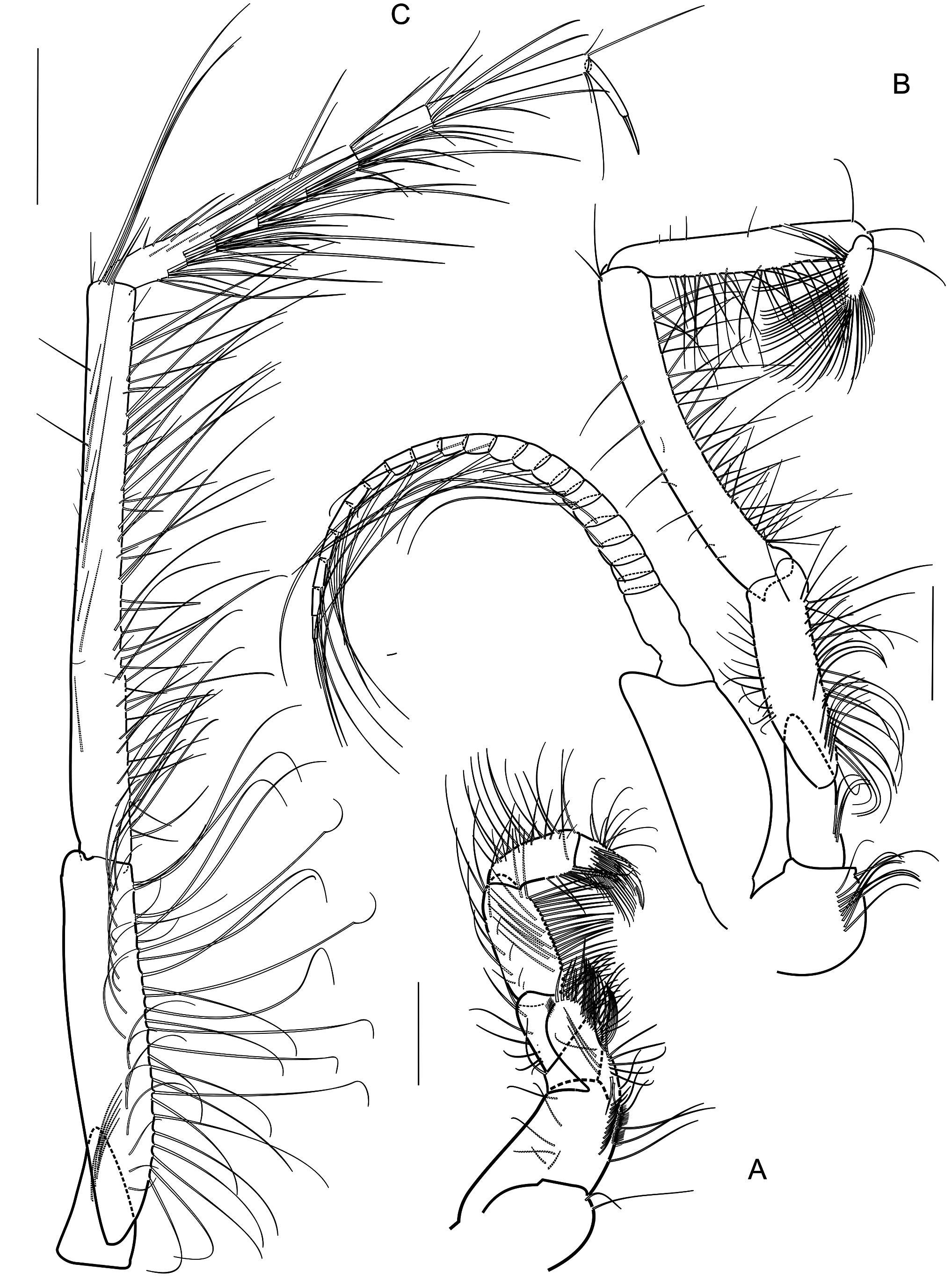
- Boreomysis (Boreomysis) sphaerops, subadult female, New South Wales, AM. A) maxilliped 1 endopod, posterior; B) maxilliped 2, anterior; C) pereopod 1 endopod, anterior. Scales (mm): 1.0.

Scientific classification
- Domain: Eukaryota
- Kingdom: Animalia
- Phylum: Arthropoda
- Class: Malacostraca
- Order: Mysida
- Family: Mysidae
- Genus: Boreomysis
- Species: B. sphaerops

Binomial name
- Boreomysis sphaerops Ii, 1964

= Boreomysis sphaerops =

Species of mysid crustaceans

Boreomysis sphaerops is a species of mysid crustaceans from the subfamily Boreomysinae (family Mysidae). It is also a member of the nominotypical subgenus Boreomysis sensu stricto. The species is a meso-bathypelagic mysid, distributed in the West Indo-Pacific, although known only from few records off Japan and Australia.

== History of discovery ==
In March-April 1938, a large number of specimens was brought by a vertical net from 1000 m depth to the surface from Sagami Bay off Ajiro Island in Japan. In 1964, N. Ii designated a 23 mm male from the April catch as the "type", and a 25 mm female from the March sample as the "allotype" of a new species Boreomysis sphaerops, and described it in detail. It seems that the species was known by other workers before the formal description. In 1958, A. Birstein and J. G. Tchindonova identified B. spinifera from the Northwest Pacific. The specimens had the dilatation in the telson cleft, not known in B. spinifera, and their specimens probably belonged to B. sphaerops. In 2023 the species became a member of the subgenus Boreomysis.

== Description ==
The adult specimens from Japan were 21-25 mm long, while the subadults from Australia as big as 27 mm. It is rather similar to Boreomysis obtusata, sharing the short rostrum, flanked by rounded angles. This type of anterior margin of the carapace is also found in B. inopinata, in which the rostrum is however more produced. Telson length is 1.2-1.3 times the length of abdominal segment 6, 3.0-3.2 times longer than wider; its posterior width 0.47-0.52 anterior width. Lateral margins of the telson with 28-54 spiniform setae, including three terminal, one of them about twice as long as the flanking, unlike in B. obtusata, where all three spiniform setae are about equal in length. Other distinguishing features are the dilatation in the telson cleft, absent both in B. obtusata and B. inopinata, and very big flat eyes with narrow cornea from dorsal view (smaller, not so flattened and with rather wide cornea in the other two relatives). Antennal scale is 4.1-4.5 times longer than wider, making it wider than in B. inopinata, without additional spines on the outer spine (found in B. inopinata). Uropods: exopod segment 1 is 0.23-0.26 of the ramus length, with two outer spiniform setae; endopod with two or three spiniform setae.

== Distribution ==
For a long time the species was known only off Japan. In 2017 it was for the first time collected from the deep water of the Tasman Sea during RV Investigator voyage. It is so far sampled from two localities off New South Wales coast, in Central Eastern Commonwealth Marine Reserve and off Byron Bay.

== Habitat ==
A meso-bathypelagic species, found at depth down to 4400 m (2300-2600 m in Australia). However the shallower limits are unclear due to vertical sampling from the Northwest Pacific.
