= Acanthomysis microps =

Scientific classification
- Domain: Eukaryota
- Kingdom: Animalia
- Phylum: Arthropoda
- Class: Malacostraca
- Order: Mysida
- Family: Mysidae
- Genus: Acanthomysis
- Species: A. microps

Binomial name
- Acanthomysis microps Abraham & Panampunnayil, 2009

Species of crustacean

Acanthomysis microps is a species of mysid that was discovered during a study of the coastal waters of Maharashtra and South Gujarat that took place during 2008 and 2009. This species of mysid is different from others in the same genus because of its "combination of broadly rounded rostrum, narrower eyes and the spination of the uropodal endopod and telson" .
