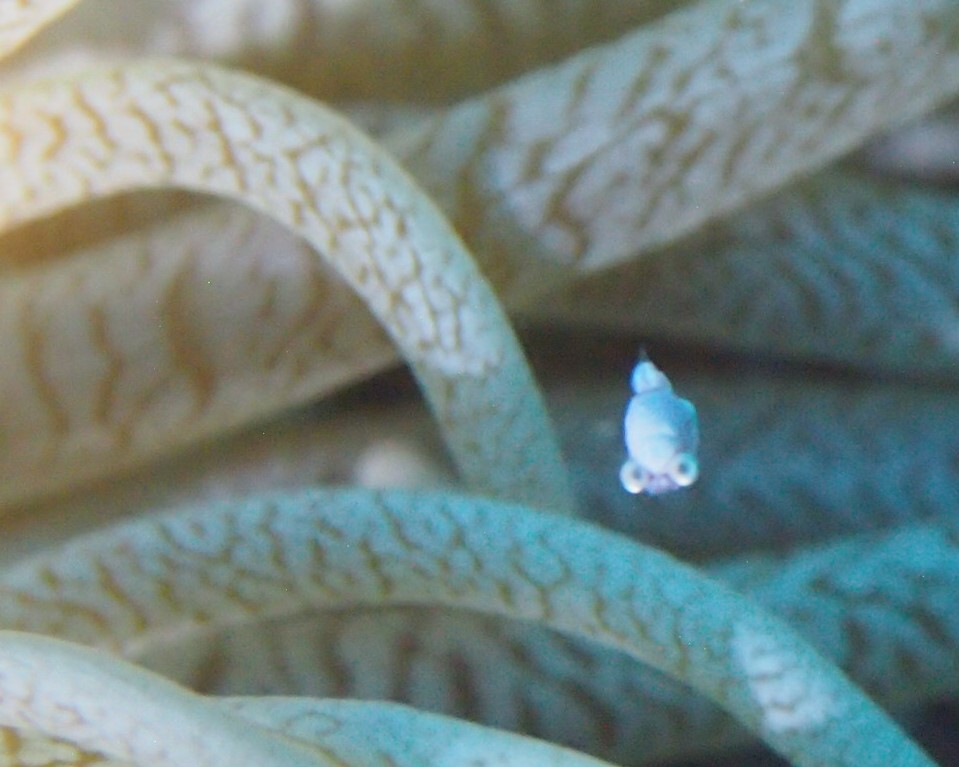
- Idiomysis sp.

Scientific classification
- Kingdom: Animalia
- Phylum: Arthropoda
- Class: Malacostraca
- Order: Mysida
- Family: Mysidae
- Subfamily: Mysinae
- Tribe: Anisomysini
- Genus: Idiomysis; W. Tattersall, 1922

Species
- Idiomysis bumbumiensis Nurshazwan, Sawamoto & Rahim, 2021; Idiomysis diadema Wittmann, 2016; Idiomysis inermis W. Tattersall, 1922; Idiomysis japonica Murano, 1978; Idiomysis mozambica Deprez, Wooldridge & Mees, 2001; Idiomysis robusta Connell, 2008; Idiomysis tsurnamali Bacescu, 1973.

= Idiomysis =

Genus of crustaceans

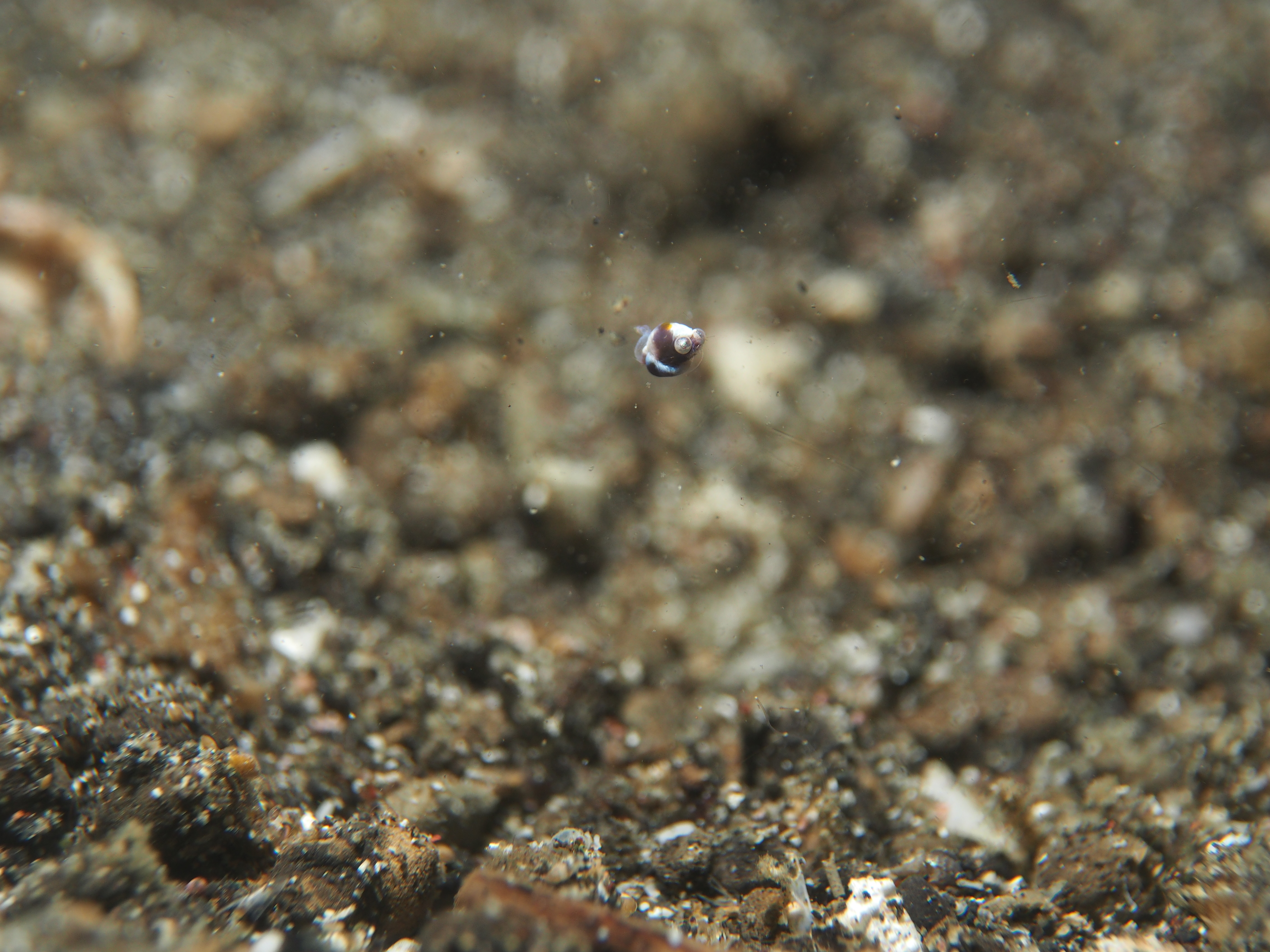
Idiomysis in Lembeh Strait, Indonesia

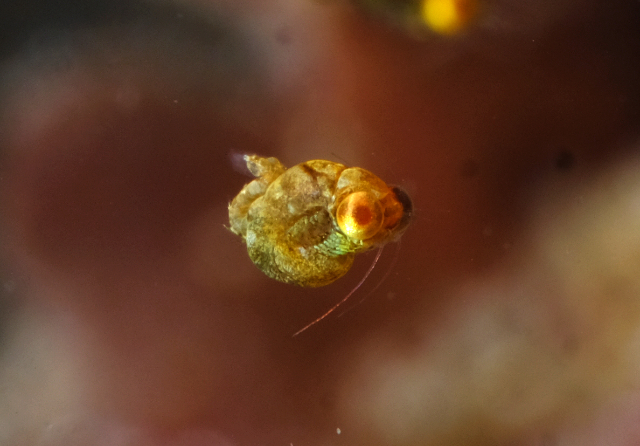
Idiomysis usually have a curled up abdomen.

Idiomysis is a genus of small mysids found in warm, shallow waters of the Indian Ocean (including the Red Sea) and the Pacific.

== Anatomy ==
Mysids from the genus Idiomysis are just a few millimeters in length; their cephalothorax is gibbous and robust whereas the abdomen is characteristically curled up behind. When compared with other mysids, Idiomysis has short antennae, relatively big eyes and small, usually unarmed telson, however a single species, I. diadema, possesses a pair of short terminal spines.

== Systematics ==
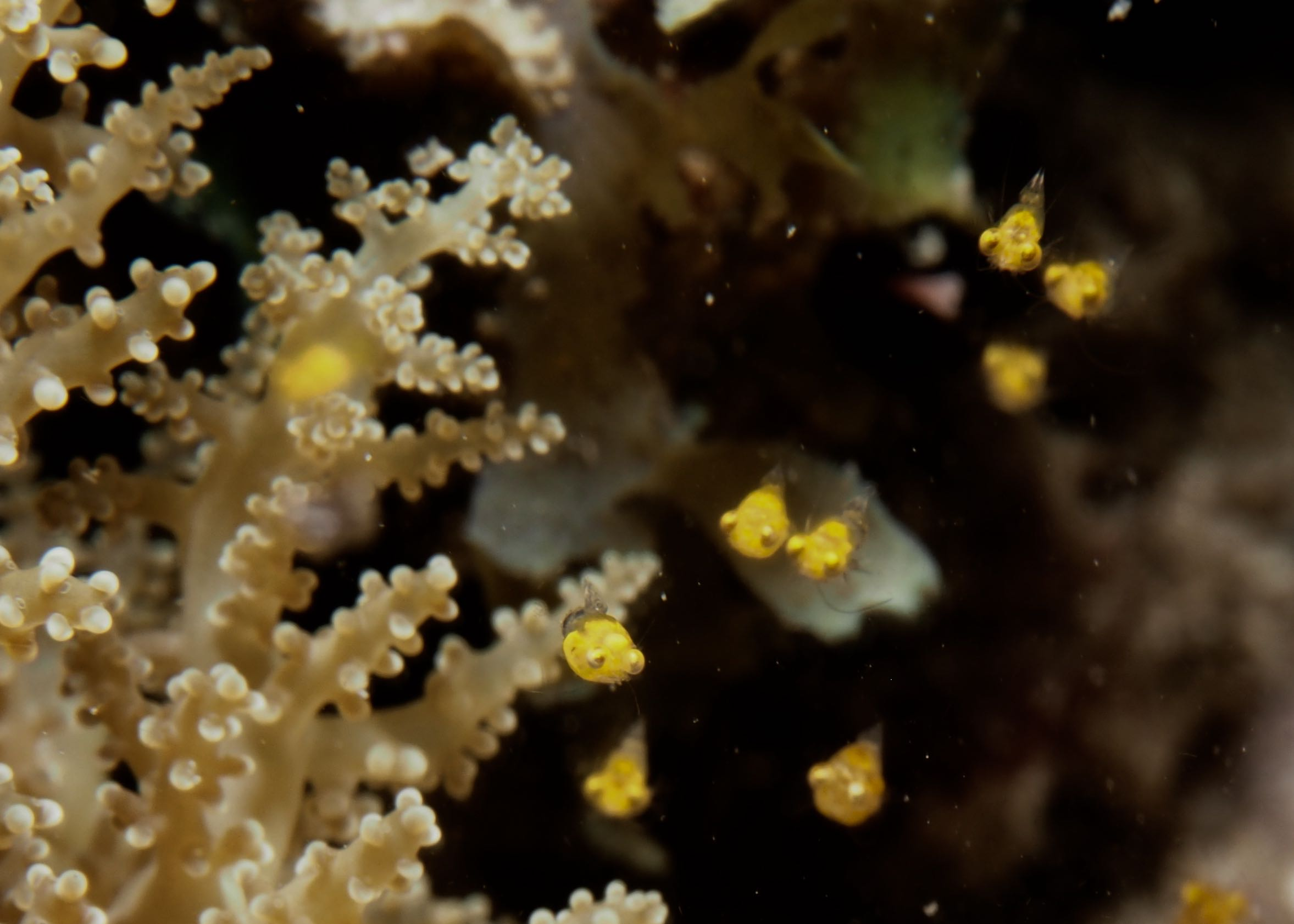
A swarm of Idiomysis hovering next to the coral in Mozambique Channel.

There are so far seven species described in the genus:

- Idiomysis bumbumiensis Nurshazwan, Sawamoto & Rahim, 2021
- Idiomysis diadema Wittmann, 2016
- Idiomysis inermis W. Tattersall, 1922
- Idiomysis japonica Murano, 1978
- Idiomysis mozambica Deprez, Wooldridge & Mees, 2001
- Idiomysis robusta Connell, 2008
- Idiomysis tsurnamali Bacescu, 1973.

== Ecology ==
Idiomysis live in small swarms of 5 to more than 40 individuals, which swim close to the seabed. All known species are found in shallow coastal waters, however they inhabit different niches and can be found on coral reefs, seaweeds, rocks or sandy bottoms. Two species – I. inermis and I. tsurnamali – are known for commensal relationship with sea anemones, whereas I. diadema is associated with the sea urchin Diadema. There are also reports of Idiomysis swimming above upside-down Cassiopea jellyfish. It is possible that mysids gain food or protection from this relationship, however the exact nature of this relation has not been studied.

== Distribution ==
The described species are known from the Red Sea (I. diadema and I. tsurnamali), the Mozambique Channel (I. mozambica), the Gulf of Mannar (I. inermis), the western coast of Australia (I. inermis), the East China Sea (I. japonica) and the western coast of South Africa (I. robusta).
