= Erythrops elegans =

Scientific classification
- Kingdom: Animalia
- Phylum: Arthropoda
- Class: Malacostraca
- Order: Mysida
- Family: Mysidae
- Genus: Erythrops
- Species: E. elegans

Binomial name
- Erythrops elegans G. O. Sars, 1869

Synonyms
- Nematopus elegans G.O. Sars, 1863

Species of crustacean

Erythrops elegans is a species of crustaceans in the family Mysidae. It is found in the northeastern Atlantic Ocean and in the Mediterranean Sea.
