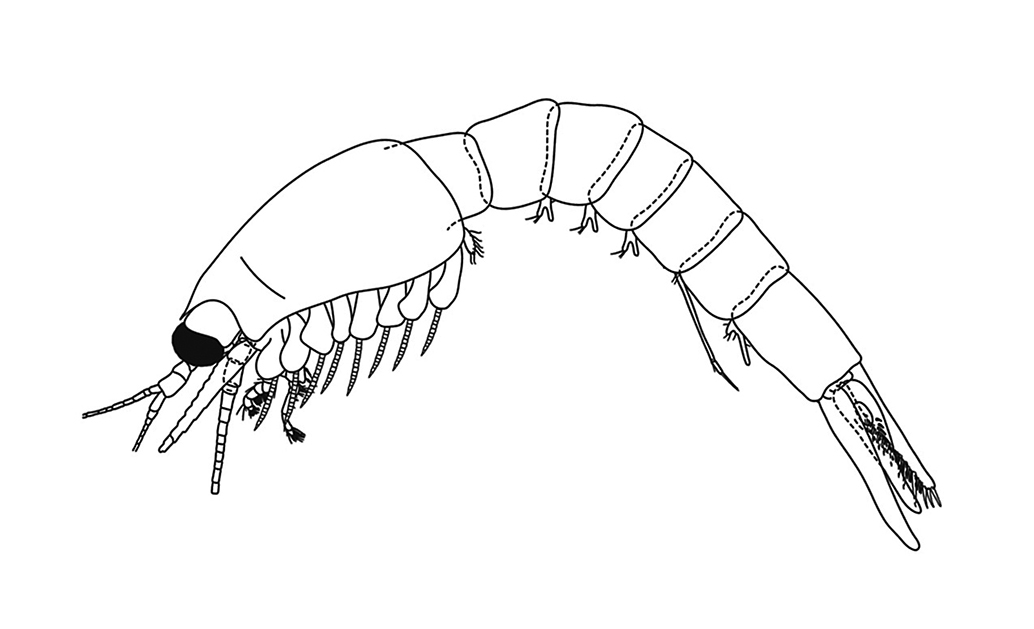

Scientific classification
- Domain: Eukaryota
- Kingdom: Animalia
- Phylum: Arthropoda
- Class: Malacostraca
- Order: Mysida
- Family: Mysidae
- Genus: Acanthomysis
- Species: A. longispina

Binomial name
- Acanthomysis longispina Fukuoka & Murano, 2002

= Acanthomysis longispina =

Species of crustacean

PMBC 14659 - Holotype site'"`UNIQ--ref-00000005-QINU`"'

Acanthomysis longispina is a species of mysid. It was first described in 2002 by Kouki Fukuoka and Masaaki Murano.

It is an omnivore and a suspension feeder, which moves by flipping its tail, and is found in the Indian Ocean at the bottom of the water column.
