= Acanthomysis brucei =

Scientific classification
- Kingdom: Animalia
- Phylum: Arthropoda
- Class: Malacostraca
- Order: Mysida
- Family: Mysidae
- Genus: Acanthomysis
- Species: A. brucei

Binomial name
- Acanthomysis brucei Fukuoka & Murano, 2002

Species of crustacean

PMBC 14635 - Holotype site'"`UNIQ--ref-00000005-QINU`"'

Acanthomysis brucei is a species of mysid. It was first described in 2002 by the Japanese marine biologists Kouki Fukuoka and Masaaki Murano.

It is an omnivore and a suspension feeder which moves by flipping its tail, and is found in the Andaman Sea at the bottom of the water column.
