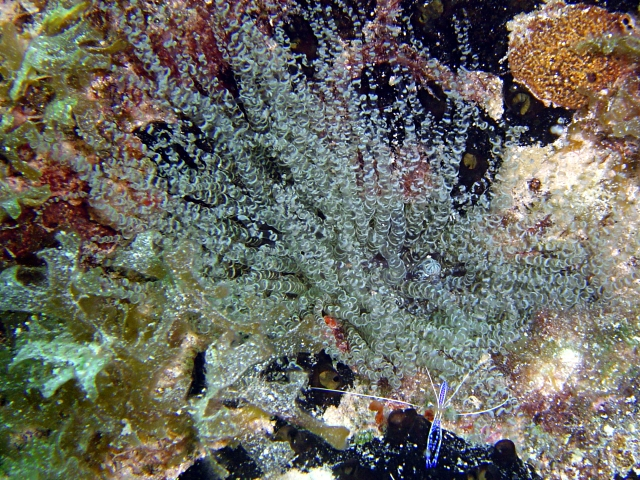
- Bartholomea annulata with a cleaner shrimp

Conservation status
- Apparently Secure (NatureServe)

Scientific classification
- Kingdom: Animalia
- Phylum: Cnidaria
- Subphylum: Anthozoa
- Class: Hexacorallia
- Order: Actiniaria
- Family: Aiptasiidae
- Genus: Bartholomea
- Species: B. annulata

Binomial name
- Bartholomea annulata (Lesueur, 1817)

Synonyms
- Actinia annulata Le Sueur, 1817; Actinia solifera Le Sueur, 1817; Aiptasia annulata (Le Sueur, 1817); Aiptasia arrulata; Aiptasia solifera (Le Sueur, 1817); Bartholomea solifera; Batholomea annulata; Carlgreniella robusta Watzl, 1922; Dysactis annulata; Paractis solifera (Le Sueur, 1817)

= Bartholomea annulata =

Species of sea anemone

Bartholomea annulata is a species of sea anemone in the family Aiptasiidae, commonly known as the ringed anemone or corkscrew anemone. It is one of the most common anemones found on reefs in the Caribbean Sea.

== Description ==
The ringed anemone can reach a diameter of 30 centimetres (12 in) when fully extended. The column is short and wide and the oral disc with its central mouth can be 12 centimetres (4.7 in) across. There are about two hundred long, translucent tentacles ringed with whorls and spirals formed by groups of cnidocytes. The general colour is grey or brown with the cnidocyte area cream coloured. The anemone contains symbiotic zooxanthellae, single-celled algae that live within its tissues. During the day these use energy from the sun to manufacture carbohydrates by photosynthesis. The sea anemone benefits from this and the algae have a safe lodging free from the likelihood of predation.

== Distribution and habitat ==
The ringed anemone is a common species in the Caribbean and Gulf of Mexico. Its range extends from Bermuda, Florida and Texas to the northern coast of South America. It is found on reefs and on soft substrates such as coral rubble or sand at depths down to about 40 metres (130 ft). It usually occupies a hole or crevice or lives under a rock, drawing back out of sight if disturbed. It has been found using the empty shell of the queen conch Lobatus gigas as a home.

== Biology ==
Some of the ringed anemone's nutritional needs are supplied by the zooxanthellae. It also feeds by extending its tentacles to catch zooplankton and small invertebrates. These are immobilised by the cnidocytes and transferred by the tentacles to the mouth.

Reproduction may be by pedal laceration. In this process, part of the basal disc of the sea anemone gets detached as the anemone moves over the substrate, and this piece is able to grow into a new individual. The anemone can also reproduce by liberating gametes into the water column. After fertilisation, the eggs hatch into larvae which are planktonic and drift with the current. After further development they settle on the seabed and undergo metamorphosis into juvenile anemones.

== Ecology ==
Predators on the ringed anemone include starfish, nudibranchs and sea spiders such as (Pigrogromitus timsanus). Infestation with this sea spider caused the sea anemone to retract its tentacles and produce copious amounts of mucus and to be unable to attach to the substrate, with death often following. The sea spider seemed unaffected by the stinging cnidocytes of the anemone.

The ringed anemone is associated with a number of other invertebrates including the opossum shrimp Heteromysis actiniae and several species of cleaner shrimps. These include Ancylomenes pedersoni and the spotted cleaner shrimp (Periclimenes yucatanicus) which live close to it or among its tentacles. They invite fish to approach by lashing their white antennae, relying on the anemone to keep them safe from attack. They then nibble at any external parasites that may be attached to the fish.
