= Nematopus =

Nematopus may refer to:

- Nematopus (bug), a genus of bugs in the family Coreidae
- Nematopus, a genus of flies in the family Dolichopodidae, synonym of Filatopus
- Nematopus, a genus of crustaceans in the family Mysidae, synonym of Erythrops
