= Tenagomysis =

Scientific classification
- Kingdom: Animalia
- Phylum: Arthropoda
- Clade: Pancrustacea
- Class: Malacostraca
- Order: Mysida
- Family: Mysidae
- Subfamily: Leptomysinae
- Genus: Tenagomysis; Thomson, 1900

Type species
- Tenagomysis novae-zealandiae Thomson, 1900

Genus of crustaceans

Tenagomysis is a genus of mysid shrimps in the family Mysidae, containing the following species:

- Tenagomysis australis Fenton, 1991
- Tenagomysis bruniensis Fenton, 1991
- Tenagomysis chiltoni W. Tattersall, 1923
- Tenagomysis longipes Murano, 2006
- Tenagomysis longisquama Fukuoka & Bruce, 2005
- Tenagomysis macropsis W. Tattersall, 1923
- Tenagomysis natalensis O. S. Tattersall, 1952
- Tenagomysis novaezealandiae Thomson, 1900
- Tenagomysis producta W. Tattersall, 1923
- Tenagomysis robusta W. Tattersall, 1923
- Tenagomysis scotti W. Tattersall, 1923
- Tenagomysis similis W. Tattersall, 1923
- Tenagomysis tanzaniana Bacescu, 1975
- Tenagomysis tasmaniae Fenton, 1991
- Tenagomysis tenuipes W. Tattersall, 1918
- Tenagomysis thomsoni W. Tattersall, 1923

Ten species of Tenagomysis are known from New Zealand, all of them endemic.
