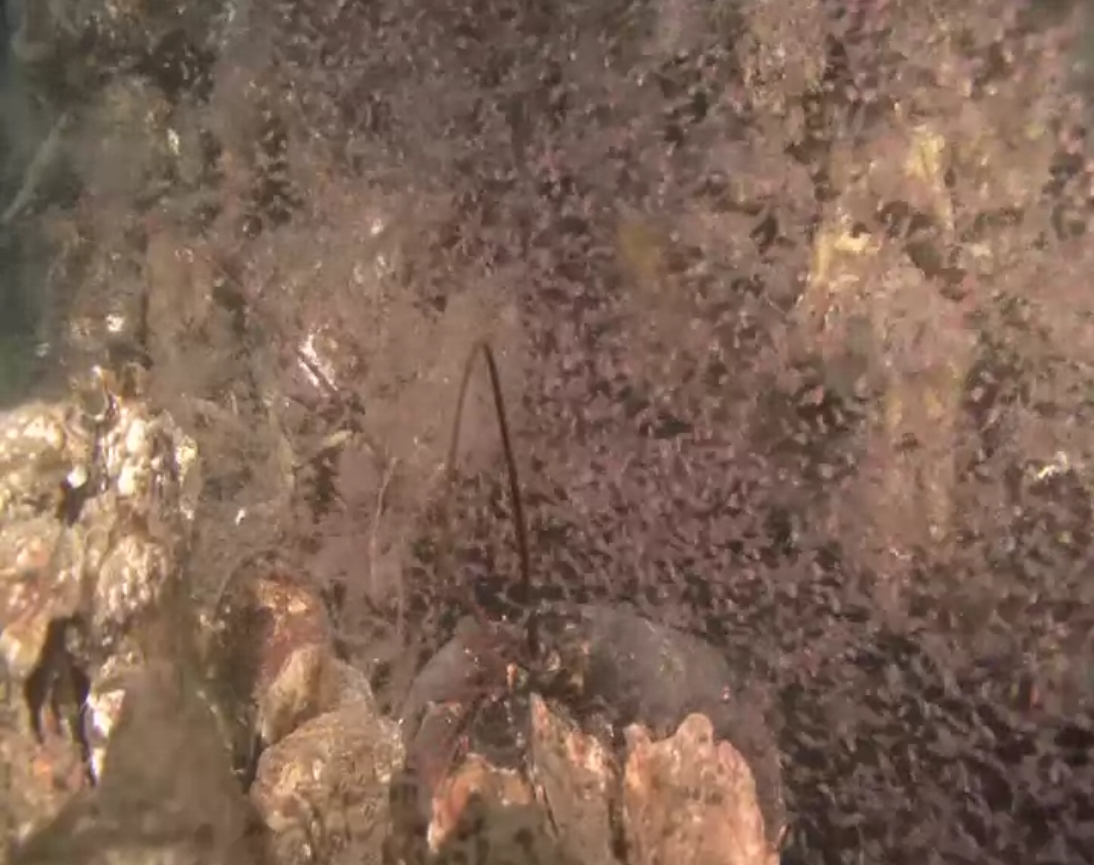
- Large group of Hemimysis lamornae

Scientific classification
- Kingdom: Animalia
- Phylum: Arthropoda
- Class: Malacostraca
- Order: Mysida
- Family: Mysidae
- Genus: Hemimysis
- Species: H. lamornae

Binomial name
- Hemimysis lamornae (Couch, 1856)
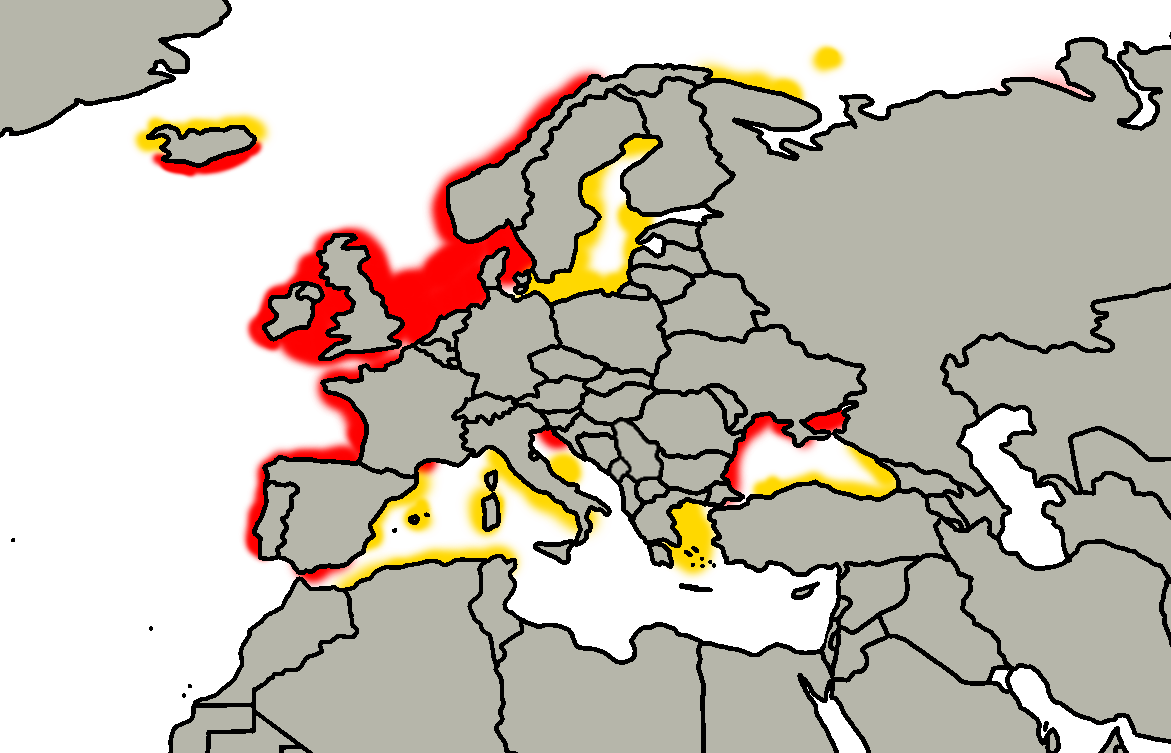
- Modelled probability of occurrence: red = high (0.8–1.0); yellow = low (0.01–0.19)

= Hemimysis lamornae =

Species of crustacean

Hemimysis lamornae, the midge shrimp, is a small mysid crustacean found in shallow waters at depths of 5 to 20 metres.

== Distribution ==
Video of midge shrimp in the Netherlands

Hemimysis lamornae occurs in the North Sea, Baltic Sea, Mediterranean Sea, and Black Sea.

== Description ==
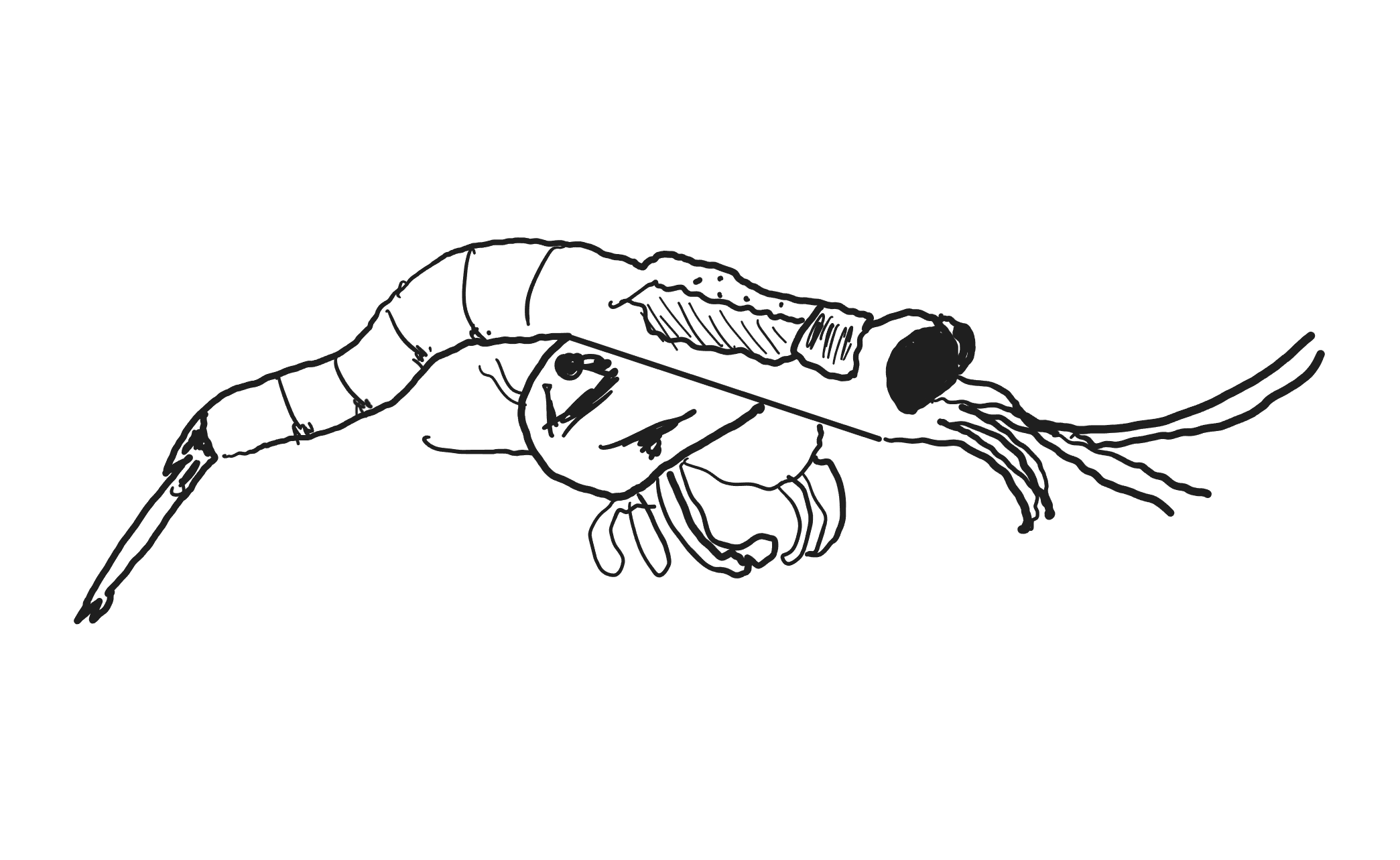
Brooding female, lateral view

Hemimysis lamornae is bright red to orange and reaches a length of about 8–10 mm. It feeds primarily on organic matter in sediments and on small crustaceans. Reproduction is sexual, and females brood their eggs in a ventral pouch until hatching.

== Sources ==
- Rastorgueff, P. A.; Harmelin-Vivien, M.; Richard, P.; Chevaldonné, P. (2011). "Feeding strategies and resource partitioning mitigate the effects of oligotrophy for marine cave mysids". Marine Ecology Progress Series. 440: 163–176. doi:10.3354/meps09347.
