= Aiptasiogeton eruptaurantia =

Scientific classification
- Kingdom: Animalia
- Phylum: Cnidaria
- Subphylum: Anthozoa
- Class: Hexacorallia
- Order: Actiniaria
- Family: Aiptasiidae
- Genus: Aiptasiogeton
- Species: A. eruptaurantia

Binomial name
- Aiptasiogeton eruptaurantia (Field, 1949)

Synonyms
- Actinothoe eruptaurantia Field, 1949; Aiptasia eruptaurantia (Field, 1949)

Species of sea anemone

Aiptasiogeton eruptaurantia, also known as the thenarian burrowing anemone or the pink-spotted sea anemone, is a species of sea anemone in the family Aiptasiidae.

== Description ==
Aiptasiogeton eruptaurantia is a small species of sea anemone that only reaches about 2.5 cm (1 in) long and 0.5 cm (0.2 in) wide. Along its long, vermiform, whitish-colored body are 10 to 11 columns of red or pink spots. At the anemone's oral disc are 64 or more tentacles in several cycles that surround the mouth.

== Distribution ==
Aiptasiogeton eruptaurantia is native to coasts of the United States in Florida, throughout the Caribbean, and in the Gulf of Mexico. However, the range of the anemone has been slowly increasing northward. In the 1940s, the species was first found in Beaufort, North Carolina. Two decades later, the anemone was found in the Chesapeake Bay. In 2009, the anemone was found in Point Judith, Rhode Island. In 2018, it was found in Wachapreague, Virgina and then the next year in New York. This change in geographic range is thought to be due to warmer water in these locations.

== Ecology ==
Within the anemone's non-native range, A. eruptairantia is not considered an invasive species as it is most likely moving by itself due to climate change and has not shown any harmful effects to native species.
