= P. sterreri =

P. sterreri may refer to:

- Parhippolyte sterreri, a crustacean species found in the Bahamas, Bermuda, Cuba and Mexico
- Platyops sterreri, a crustacean species endemic to Bermuda
