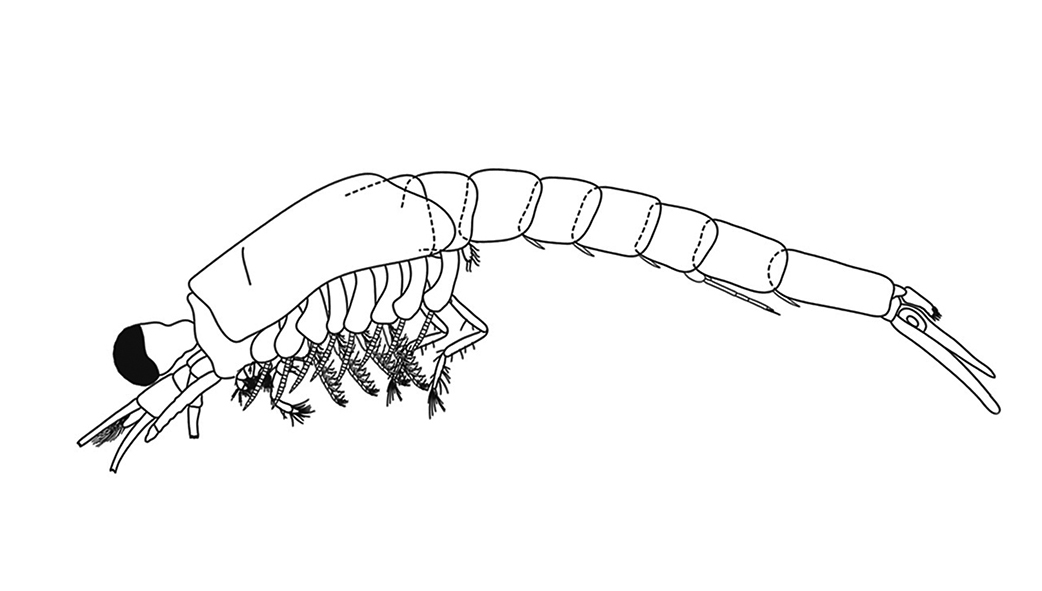

Scientific classification
- Kingdom: Animalia
- Phylum: Arthropoda
- Clade: Pancrustacea
- Class: Malacostraca
- Order: Mysida
- Family: Mysidae
- Genus: Anisomysis
- Species: A. aikawai

Binomial name
- Anisomysis aikawai Ii, 1964

= Anisomysis aikawai =

Species of crustacean

Anisomysis aikawai is a species of mysid (family: Mysidae, subgenus: Anomysis) and was first described in 1964 by Ii Naoyoshi. It is found in shallow marine waters.
