= Tasman Seamounts =

Tasman Seamounts may refer to:

- Tasmanian Seamounts
- Tasmantid Seamount Chain
