= Americamysis bahia =

Scientific classification
- Kingdom: Animalia
- Phylum: Arthropoda
- Class: Malacostraca
- Order: Mysida
- Family: Mysidae
- Genus: Americamysis
- Species: A. bahia

Binomial name
- Americamysis bahia (Molenock, 1969)

Synonyms
- Mysidopsis bahia Molenock, 1969

Species of crustacean

Americamysis bahia is a shrimp-like crustacean in the order Mysida, the opossum shrimps. It is native to estuarine waters in Texas and Florida in the United States. It is often referred to in the literature as Mysidopsis bahia and is widely cultured and used in the laboratory for toxicology testing.

== Description ==
Americamysis bahia grows to a length of about 9.4 mm (0.37 in), the females being larger than the males. These shrimps are transparent, often with a yellowish, brownish or blackish tinge.

== Distribution and habitat ==
Americamysis bahia is native to the east coast of the United States, its range extending from Rhode Island to Florida and the Gulf of Mexico. It is an estuarine species and can tolerate a wide range of salinity levels ranging from 54 to 2 psu (practical salinity units), being most common around 30 psu. It is seldom found at depths greater than 2 m (6 ft 7 in) and its typical habitat is over sandy or muddy seabeds, often in seagrass meadows.

== Behaviour ==
Americamysis bahia is found on or just above the seabed, tending to be concentrated in slight depressions and facing towards the current. At night it makes vertical migrations to feed at the surface. Opossum shrimps are omnivores and although the diet of Americamysis bahia in the wild has not been studied, examination of the stomach contents of the closely related Americamysis almyra showed 31% vascular plant debris and 11% copepods and diatoms. In the laboratory it is usually fed on the larvae of the brine shrimp Artemia salina. Opossum shrimps play an important part in the food chain and are consumed in large quantities by such fish as the inland silverside, whiffs and flounders.

== Life cycle ==
Female Americamysis bahia shrimps become mature between the twelfth and twentieth day, depending on diet and temperature. The eggs are fertilised and the embryos develop in the female's brood pouch, underneath her thorax. Batches of five to seven young per brood are usual and are released into the water column in four to six days. The juveniles are planktonic for twenty-four hours before settling on the bottom. Females can produce multiple broods over the course of a few months.

== Use in research ==
Americamysis bahia is relatively sensitive to toxic pollutants. Because of this and the fact that it is small, has a short life cycle, and is easy to culture, it is extensively used in toxicity testing.
