= Boreomysis =

Scientific classification
- Domain: Eukaryota
- Kingdom: Animalia
- Phylum: Arthropoda
- Class: Malacostraca
- Order: Mysida
- Family: Mysidae
- Subfamily: Boreomysinae
- Genus: Boreomysis; G.O. Sars, 1869

Species
- Boreomysis (Boreomysis) acuminata O. S. Tattersall, 1955; Boreomysis (Boreomysis) arctica (Krøyer, 1861); Boreomysis (Boreomysis) atlantica Nouvel, 1942; Boreomysis (Boreomysis) bispinosa O. S. Tattersall, 1955; Boreomysis (Boreomysis) brucei W. M. Tattersall, 1913; Boreomysis (Boreomysis) californica Ortmann, 1894; Boreomysis (Boreomysis) chelata Birstein et Tchindonova, 1958; Boreomysis (Boreomysis) curtirostris Birstein et Tchindonova, 1958; Boreomysis (Boreomysis) dubia Coifmann, 1937; Boreomysis (Boreomysis) fragilis Hansen, 1912; Boreomysis (Boreomysis) hanseni Holmquist, 1956; Boreomysis (Boreomysis) illigi O. S. Tattersall, 1955; Boreomysis (Boreomysis) incisa Nouvel, 1942; Boreomysis (Boreomysis) inopinata Daneliya, 2023; Boreomysis (Boreomysis) intermedia Ii, 1964; Boreomysis (Boreomysis) jacobi Holmquist, 1956; Boreomysis (Boreomysis) latipes Birstein et Tchindonova, 1958; Boreomysis (Boreomysis) longispina Birstein et Tchindonova, 1958; Boreomysis (Boreomysis) macrophthalma Birstein et Tchindonova, 1958; Boreomysis (Boreomysis) microps G. O. Sars, 1883; Boreomysis (Boreomysis) nobilis G. O. Sars, 1879; Boreomysis (Boreomysis) obtusata G. O. Sars, 1883; Boreomysis (Boreomysis) oparva Saltzman et Bowman, 1993; Boreomysis (Boreomysis) pearcyi Murano et Krygier, 1985; Boreomysis (Boreomysis) plebeja Hansen, 1910; Boreomysis (Boreomysis) rostrata Illig, 1906; Boreomysis (Boreomysis) semicoeca Hansen, 1905; Boreomysis (Boreomysis) sibogae Hansen, 1910; Boreomysis (Boreomysis) sphaerops Ii, 1964; Boreomysis (Boreomysis) tanakai Ii, 1964; Boreomysis (Boreomysis) tattersalli O. S. Tattersall, 1955; Boreomysis (Boreomysis) tridens G. O. Sars, 1870; Boreomysis (Boreomysis) vanhoeffeni Zimmer, 1914; Boreomysis (Boreomysis) verrucosa W. M. Tattersall, 1939; Boreomysis (Petryashovia) insolita O. S. Tattersall, 1955; Boreomysis (Petryashovia) kistnae Pillai, 1973; Boreomysis (Petryashovia) megalops G. O. Sars, 1872; Boreomysis (Petryashovia) urospina Daneliya, 2023

Synonyms
- Arctomysis Czerniavsky, 1882; Pseudanchialus Caullery, 1896

Genus of crustaceans

Boreomysis (from Greek Boreas, the god of the northern winds, and the genus name Mysis) is a mysid crustacean genus, the type of the subfamily Boreomysinae of the family Mysidae. Majority of the species are found in the ocean deep water. Cosmopolitan. 38 species.

== Description ==
Compared to another genus of the subfamily, Neobirsteiniamysis, the members of the genus Boreomysis have narrower telson, not expanded in the central part, being always narrower than in the anterior part. Also the eyes are mostly normally developed. Although in certain species the eyes may be reduced to certain extent, they still always possess cornea, unlike in Neobirsteiniamysis.

== Taxonomy ==
The originally designated type species is Mysis arctica Krøyer, 1861.

Boreomysis is one of the most difficult mysid genera, mostly due to considerable variation with age.

== Classification ==
The species of Boreomysis are distributed among two subgenera:

- Boreomysis sensu stricto, 34 species, and
- Petryashovia Daneliya, 2023, 4 species

=== Subgenus Boreomysis sensu stricto ===
The nominate subgenus combines most of the species of Boreomysis sensu lato, found in epi-bathypelagic waters, which have pointed rostrum and large ventrolateral projections of the carapace. Nearly all its species have 2-segmented propodus of pereopods (the exception is Boreomysis dubia, which has only one segment).

=== Subgenus Petryashovia ===
Subgenus Petryashovia, with the type species Boreomysis megalops G. O. Sars, 1872, includes epi-mesopelagic species with somewhat less developed carapace projections (no rostrum and rather short ventrolateral lobes) and undevided propodus of pereopods.

The name is dedicated to a carcinologist Victor Vladimirovich Petryashov (1956–2018).

== Distribution ==
Members of the genus are found in all oceans, and Boreomysis can be considered cosmopolitan.

== Habitat ==
Most of the species are oceanic deep-water. Some, however, penetrate deep parts of inland seas. The depth is from surface or subsurface waters (epipelagic) down to 6000 m (bathypelagic).
