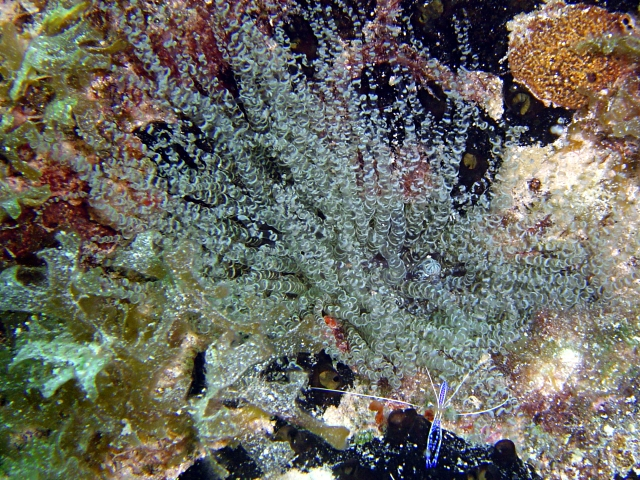
- Bartholomea annulata with a cleaner shrimp

Scientific classification
- Domain: Eukaryota
- Kingdom: Animalia
- Phylum: Cnidaria
- Class: Hexacorallia
- Order: Actiniaria
- Family: Aiptasiidae
- Genus: Bartholomea; Duchassaing de Fombressin & Michelotti, 1864

= Bartholomea =

Genus of sea anemones

Bartholomea is a genus of sea anemones in the family Aiptasiidae.

== Species ==
The following species are recognized:

- Bartholomea annulata (Le Sueur, 1817)
- Bartholomea peruviana (Pax, 1912)
- Bartholomea pseudotagetes Pax, 1924
- Bartholomea werneri Watzl, 1922
