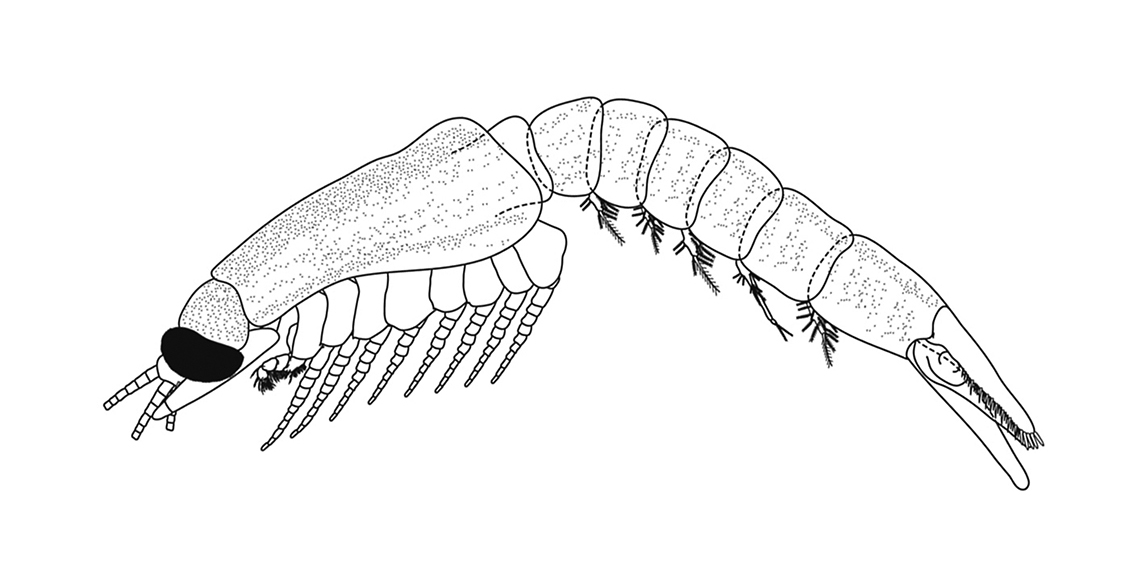
- Acanthomysis platycauda

Scientific classification
- Domain: Eukaryota
- Kingdom: Animalia
- Phylum: Arthropoda
- Class: Malacostraca
- Order: Mysida
- Family: Mysidae
- Subfamily: Mysinae
- Tribe: Neomysini
- Genus: Acanthomysis; Czerniavsky, 1882

Species
- See text

= Acanthomysis =

Genus of crustaceans

Acanthomysis is a genus of mysids, containing 28 species.

- Acanthomysis anomala Pillai, 1961
- Acanthomysis bispinosa Bacescu, 1979
- Acanthomysis borealis Banner, 1954
- Acanthomysis bowmani Modlin & Orsi, 1997
- Acanthomysis brucei Fukuoka & Murano, 2002
- Acanthomysis brunnea Murano & Chess, 1987
- Acanthomysis californica Murano & Chess, 1987
- Acanthomysis columbiae (W. Tattersall, 1933)
- Acanthomysis dimorpha Ii, 1936
- Acanthomysis fluviatilis (Babueva, 1988)
- Acanthomysis hodgarti (W. Tattersall, 1922)
- Acanthomysis indica (W. Tattersall, 1922)
- Acanthomysis japonica (Marukawa, 1928)
- Acanthomysis laticauda Liu & Wang, 1983
- Acanthomysis longicornis (Milne-Edwards, 1837)
- Acanthomysis longispina Fukuoka & Murano, 2002
- Acanthomysis macrops Pillai, 1973
- Acanthomysis microps Biju & Panampunnayil, 2009
- Acanthomysis minuta Liu & Wang, 1983
- Acanthomysis ornata O. Tattersall, 1965
- Acanthomysis pelagica (Pillai, 1957)
- Acanthomysis platycauda (Pillai, 1961)
- Acanthomysis quadrispinosa Nouvel, 1965
- Acanthomysis sinensis Ii, 1964
- Acanthomysis stelleri (Derzhavin, 1913)
- Acanthomysis strauchi (Czerniavsky, 1882)
- Acanthomysis thailandica Murano, 1986
- Acanthomysis trophopristes O. Tattersall, 1957
