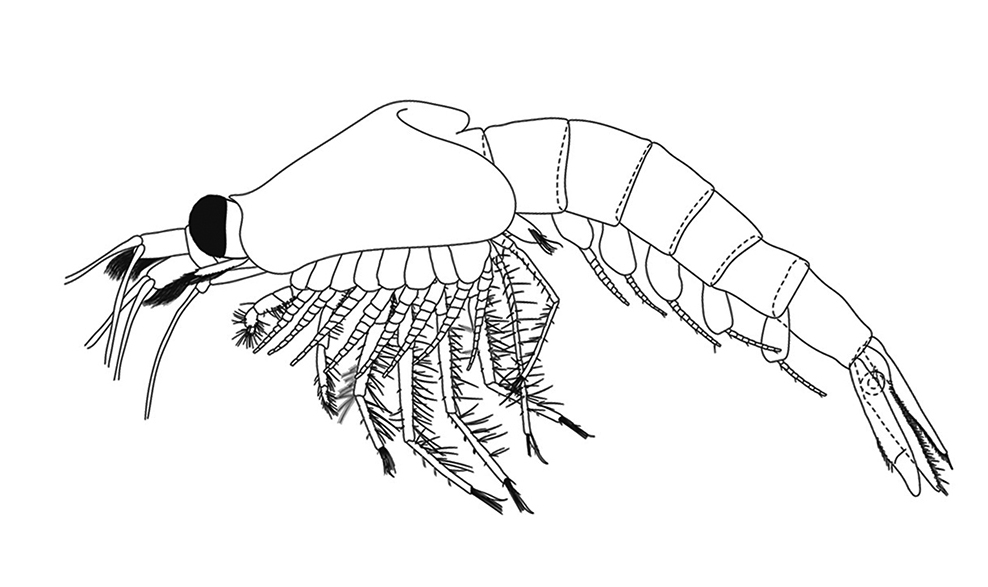
- Siriella vulgaris

Scientific classification
- Kingdom: Animalia
- Phylum: Arthropoda
- Class: Malacostraca
- Order: Mysida
- Family: Mysidae
- Tribe: Siriellini
- Genus: Siriella; Dana, 1850

Type species
- None designated.

Synonyms
- Cynthia Thompson, 1829; Cynthilia White, 1850; Heterosiriella Czerniavsky, 1882; Promysis Krøyer, 1861; Protosiriella Czerniavsky, 1882; Pseudosiriella Claus, 1884; Rhinomysis Czerniavsky, 1882; Siriellerythrops Ledoyer, 1970; Siriellides Czerniavsky, 1882

= Siriella =

Genus of crustaceans

Siriella is a genus of mysid crustaceans form the family Mysidae, consisting of approximately 90 species. Found in all seas except cold Arctic and Antarctic waters, the genus is most diverse in tropics.

One of the largest and most difficult mysid genera, Siriella is divided into a number of species groups.
