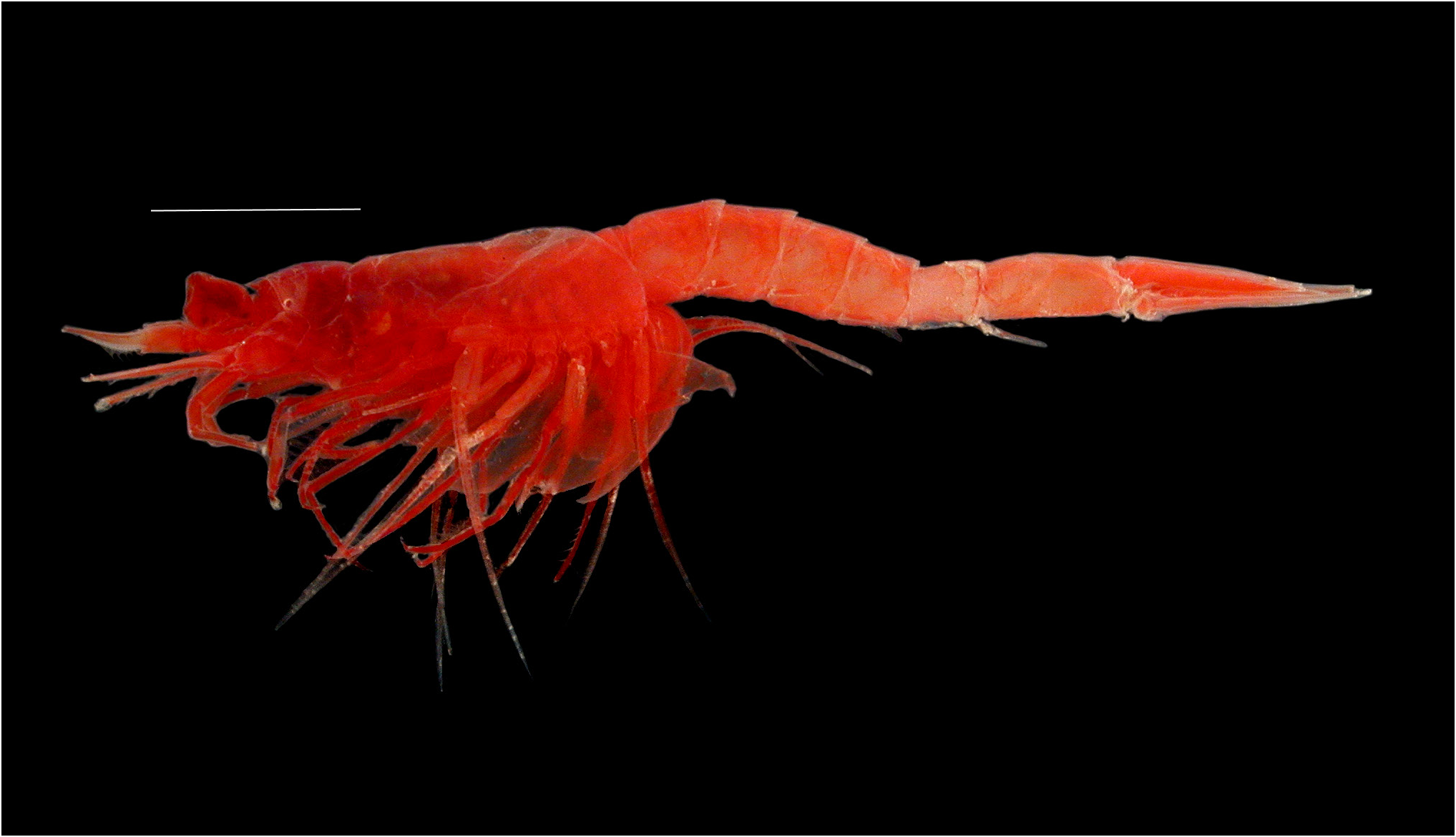
- Neobirsteiniamysis inermis

Scientific classification
- Domain: Eukaryota
- Kingdom: Animalia
- Phylum: Arthropoda
- Class: Malacostraca
- Order: Mysida
- Family: Mysidae
- Genus: Neobirsteiniamysis
- Species: N. inermis

Binomial name
- Neobirsteiniamysis inermis (Willemoes-Suhm, 1874)

Synonyms
- Petalophthalmus inermis Willemoes-Suhm, 1874; Boreomysis scyphops G. O. Sars, 1879; Boreomysis suhmi Faxon, 1893; Boreomysis distinguenda Hansen, 1908

= Neobirsteiniamysis inermis =

Species of crustaceans

Neobirsteiniamysis inermis is a deepwater mysid crustacean species of the genus Neobirsteiniamysis. One of the largest and the only known mysid, distributed in both polar regions.

== Description ==
Body is intensively red. The length of adults ranges between 40 and 85 mm, which makes it the largest species in the order Mysida. Compared to the related Neobirsteiniamysis caeca N.inermis has less transparent cuticle, telson with rather parallele lateral margins (convex in N.caeca) and its cleft being 0,16-0,29 of telson length and having convex sides, shorter eyes, not reaching antennular peduncle segment 3, the eye concavity being lateral, not terminal, narrower and less apically protruding antennal scale, which is 5-7 times as long as wide, but with somewhat longer antennular peduncle (longer than half of antennal scale), slightly wider uropodal exopods, with spiniform setae at 0,22-0,29 of exopod length.

== Taxonomy ==
The type locality of the species is off Crozet Islands in the Southern Indian Ocean. The type material is probably lost.

== Distribution ==
Found in all four oceans from polar to tropical deepwater, Neobirsteiniamysis inermis is also the most widespread species of mysids, and a generally rare case of the bipolar-amphitropical marine species.

== Habitat and biology ==
Bathyal-abyssal, nectobenthic species, found from depths of 700-7200 m. Predominantly phytophagous, although may also feed on other crustaceans.
