= Aiptasiogeton =

Scientific classification
- Kingdom: Animalia
- Phylum: Cnidaria
- Subphylum: Anthozoa
- Class: Hexacorallia
- Order: Actiniaria
- Family: Aiptasiidae
- Genus: Aiptasiogeton; Schmidt, 1972

Genus of sea anemones

Aiptasiogeton is a genus of sea anemone in the family Aiptasiidae.

There are three recognized species in the genus:

- Aiptasiogeton eruptaurantia (Field, 1949)
- Aiptasiogeton hyalinus (Delle Chiaje, 1822)
- Aiptasiogeton parva (Carlgren, 1938)
