= Heteromysis actiniae =

Scientific classification
- Kingdom: Animalia
- Phylum: Arthropoda
- Class: Malacostraca
- Order: Mysida
- Family: Mysidae
- Genus: Heteromysis
- Species: H. actiniae

Binomial name
- Heteromysis actiniae Clarke, 1955

Species of crustacean

Heteromysis actiniae, commonly known as the anemone mysid, is a species of opossum shrimp from the family Mysidae found in association with the sea anemone Bartholomea annulata. It is found in the Caribbean Sea and the Gulf of Mexico.

== Description ==
Male anemone mysids grow to a length of about 6.8 millimetres (0.27 in) and females to a length of 7.5 millimetres (0.30 in). A broad, bright red stripe extends from the tip of the antennae, past the eyes, along the top of the carapace and back, to the tail, dividing where it reaches the paired uropods.

== Distribution ==
The anemone mysid is found living in association with the sea anemone Bartholomea annulata in the Bahamas, the Lesser Antilles, the Caribbean Sea, the Gulf of Mexico and the eastern coasts of Mexico and Panama down to a depth of a few metres (yards). It has also been found along with sixteen other species of opossum shrimp off the coast of Belize.

== Ecology ==
The anemone mysid usually lives in groups of up to twenty individuals but occasionally there may be a hundred swimming up and down among the tentacles of the sea anemone, seldom going farther than a few centimetres (inches) away from it. The shrimps seem to be immune to the stinging cells known as cnidocytes that are found in rings and spirals on the tentacles. The shrimps are scavengers and also feed on scraps of food ejected from the anemone's mouth. In the female anemone mysid, some of the thoracic legs are modified to form a brood pouch in which the eggs are carried until they hatch. The nauplius larvae that emerge remain in the pouch at first feeding on their yolk reserves. They then become planktonic and pass through several developmental stages before settling on the seabed, preferably in the vicinity of an anemone.
