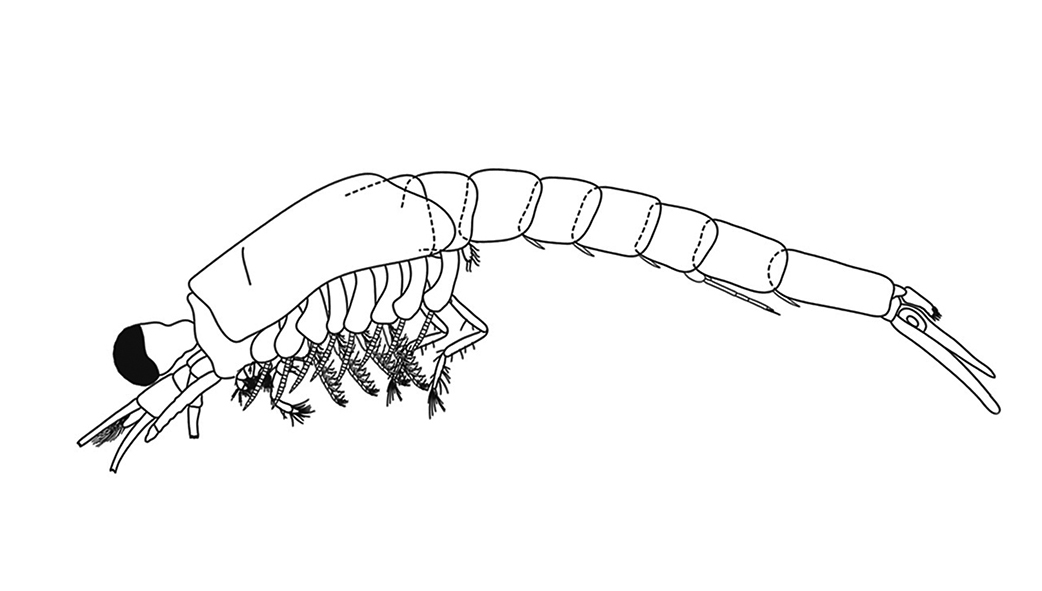
- Anisomysis aikawai

Scientific classification
- Domain: Eukaryota
- Kingdom: Animalia
- Phylum: Arthropoda
- Class: Malacostraca
- Order: Mysida
- Family: Mysidae
- Subfamily: Mysinae
- Genus: Anisomysis; Hansen, 1910

= Anisomysis =

Genus of crustacean

Anisomysis is a genus of mysids, first described in 1910 by Hans Jacob Hansen.

== Species ==
Species and subgenera accepted by WoRMS are:

Subgenus Anisomysis (Anisomysis) Băcescu, 1973

- Anisomysis aikawai Ii, 1964
- Anisomysis akajimaensis Murano, 1990
- Anisomysis australis Zimmer, 1918
- Anisomysis bacescui Pillai, 1976
- Anisomysis bifurcata W. Tattersall, 1912
- Anisomysis boraboraensis Murano, 1995
- Anisomysis brevicauda Wang, 1989
- Anisomysis chessi Murano, 1983
- Anisomysis comorensis Wooldridge & Mees, 2004
- Anisomysis enewetakensis Murano, 1983
- Anisomysis extranea Murano, 1995
- Anisomysis hanseni Nouvel, 1967
- Anisomysis hashizumei Fukuoka & Murano, 1997
- Anisomysis hawaiiensis Murano, 1995
- Anisomysis incisa W. Tattersall, 1936
- Anisomysis kunduchiana Băcescu, 1975
- Anisomysis laticauda Hansen, 1910
- Anisomysis levi Băcescu, 1973
- Anisomysis maldivensis Murano & Fukuoka, 2003
- Anisomysis megalops (Illig, 1930)
- Anisomysis minuta Liu & Wang, 1983
- Anisomysis mixta Nakazawa, 1910
- Anisomysis mullini Murano, 1987
- Anisomysis nana Murano, 1995
- Anisomysis neptuni Connell, 2009
- Anisomysis parvispina Murano & Fukuoka, 2003
- Anisomysis pelewensis Ii, 1964
- Anisomysis pescaprae Connell, 2009
- Anisomysis phuketensis Moriya, Srinui & Sawamoto, 2015
- Anisomysis quadrispinosa Wang, 1989
- Anisomysis robustispina Panampunnayil, 1984
- Anisomysis rotunda Murano & Fukuoka, 2003
- Anisomysis sirielloides Băcescu, 1975
- Anisomysis spinaintus Moriya, Srinui & Sawamoto, 2015
- Anisomysis spinata Panampunnayil, 1993
- Anisomysis truncata Panampunnayil, 1993
- Anisomysis unispinosa Wooldridge & Mees, 2004
- Anisomysis vasseuri Ledoyer, 1974

Subgenus Anisomysis (Carnegieomysis) W. Tattersall, 1943

- Anisomysis bipartoculata Ii, 1964
- Anisomysis hispida Pillai, 1973
- Anisomysis tattersallae Pillai, 1973
- Anisomysis xenops (W. Tattersall, 1943)

Subgenus Anisomysis (Javanisomysis) Băcescu, 1992

- Anisomysis baliensis Sawamoto & Hanamura, 2017
- Anisomysis gutzui Băcescu, 1992
- Anisomysis lombokensis Sawamoto, Hanamura, Mantiri & Ohtsuka, 2020
- Anisomysis similis Sawamoto, Srinui & Moriya, 2015
- Anisomysis thurneysseni Nouvel, 1973

Subgenus Anisomysis (Paranisomysis) Băcescu, 1973

- Anisomysis acuminata Murano, 1990
- Anisomysis arabica Wooldridge & Victor, 2004
- Anisomysis constricta Murano, 1983
- Anisomysis gracilis Panampunnayil, 1984
- Anisomysis hosakai Murano, 1990
- Anisomysis ijimai Nakazawa, 1910
- Anisomysis laccadivei Panampunnayil, 1981
- Anisomysis lamellicauda (Hansen, 1912)
- Anisomysis marisrubri Băcescu, 1973
- Anisomysis minicoyensis Biju, Panampunnayil & Prabhakaran, 2006
- Anisomysis modestiangusta Murano & Fukuoka, 2003
- Anisomysis ohtsukai Murano, 1994
- Anisomysis omorii Murano & Fukuoka, 2003
- Anisomysis parvisinuosa Murano & Fukuoka, 2003
- Anisomysis ryukyuensis Murano, 1990
- Anisomysis spatulispina Murano, 1995
- Anisomysis sudafricana Connell, 2009
- Anisomysis takedai Hanamura & Tsutsui, 2012
