= Bermudamysis =

Conservation status
- Critically Endangered (IUCN 3.1)

Scientific classification
- Kingdom: Animalia
- Phylum: Arthropoda
- Class: Malacostraca
- Order: Mysida
- Family: Mysidae
- Genus: Bermudamysis; Băcescu & Iliffe, 1986
- Species: B. speluncola

Binomial name
- Bermudamysis speluncola Băcescu & Iliffe, 1986

Genus of crustaceans

Bermudamysis speluncola is a species of crustacean in the family Mysidae, endemic to Bermuda, and the only species in the genus Bermudamysis.

== See also ==
- Platyops
