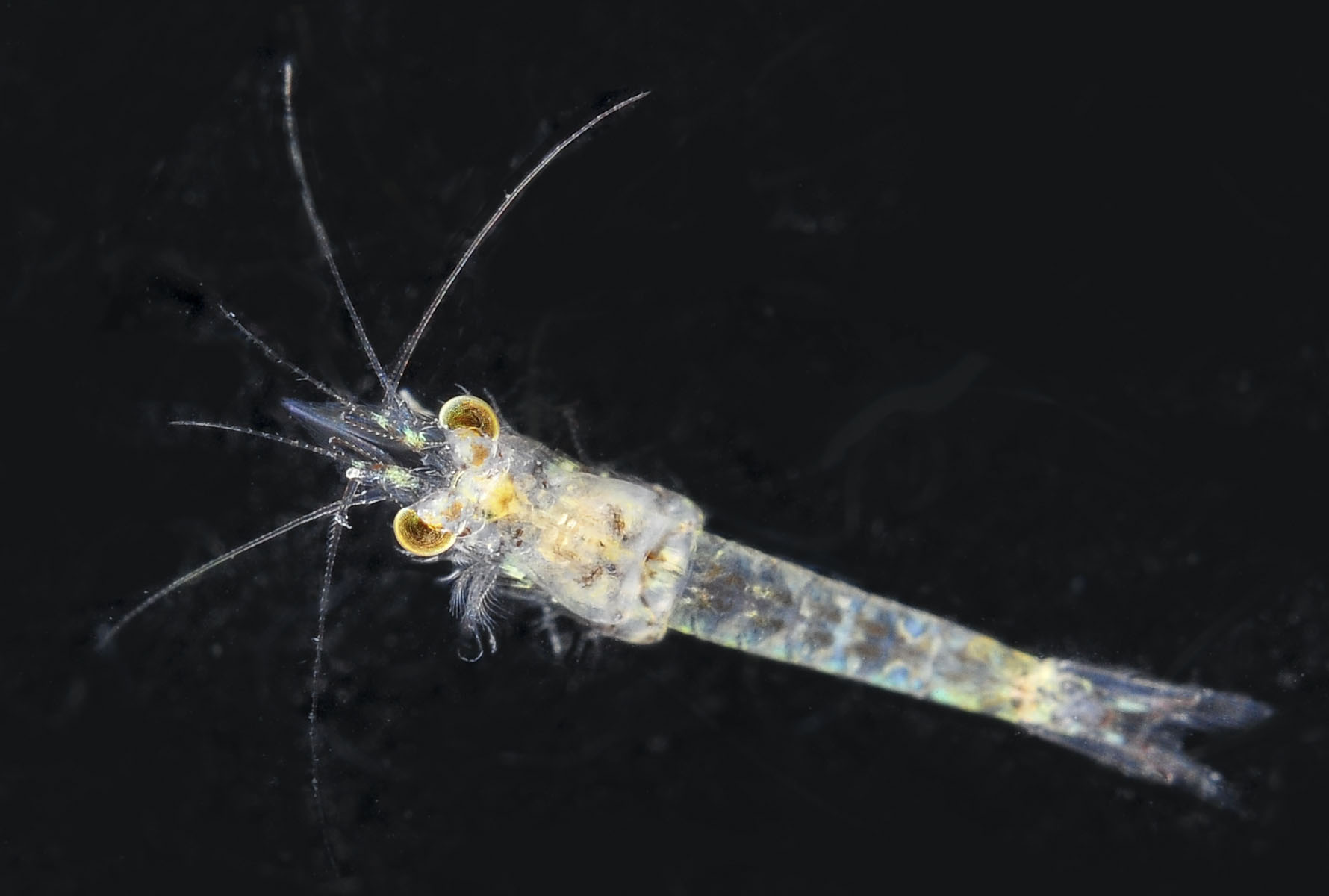

Scientific classification
- Kingdom: Animalia
- Phylum: Arthropoda
- Clade: Pancrustacea
- Class: Malacostraca
- Order: Mysida
- Family: Mysidae
- Subfamily: Leptomysinae
- Genus: Americamysis; G.O. Sars, 1864

Species
- See text

= Americamysis =

Genus of crustaceans

Americamysis is a genus of mysid shrimps in the family Mysidae. The sensitivity of these shrimps to water quality makes them suitable for bioassays. Americamysis bahia and Americamysis almyra, which are used frequently to test for pesticides and other toxic substances, are often referred to as Mysidopsis bahia and Mysidopsis almyra in the literature.

== Species ==
The World Register of Marine Species lists the following species:

- Americamysis alleni Price, Heard & Stuck, 1994
- Americamysis almyra (Bowman, 1964)
- Americamysis bahia (Molenock, 1969)
- Americamysis bigelowi (W. Tattersall, 1926)
- Americamysis stucki Price, Heard & Stuck, 1994
- Americamysis taironana (Brattegard, 1973)
