= Tasmanian Seamounts =

Group of underwater volcanoes off the southern tip of Tasmania

Coordinates: 44°18′S 147°00′E

- Location within Indian Ocean
- Summit depth: 660 and 1,700 m (2,000 and 6,000 ft)
- Height: 300 to 600 m (1,000 to 2,000 ft)
- Summit area: 25 km (16 mi) across

Location
- Location: South of Tasmania
- Country: Australia

Geology
- Type: Seamounts (underwater volcanoes)
- Age of rock: ~55 million years old
- Last eruption: 7 million years ago

The Tasmanian Seamounts (also Tasman Seamounts and Tasmania Seamounts) are a group of seamounts (underwater volcanoes) located off the southern tip of Tasmania. The seamounts were created more than 55 million years ago by the Tasman hotspot. The seamounts are ecologically important, and harbor a lush marine ecosystem, but are threatened by overfishing. For this reason, part of the Tasmanian Seamounts were incorporated into a marine reserve in 1999.

== Geology ==
The Tasmanian Seamounts were created by the Tasman hotspot, a 4,000 km (2,000 mi) long mantle plume that is currently the active center of Mount Erebus in Antarctica. The seamounts, created roughly 55 million years ago, are between 1,000 and 2,000 m (3,000 and 7,000 ft) deep, 25 km (16 mi) across, and 200 to 500 m (700 to 1,600 ft) tall.

== Ecology ==
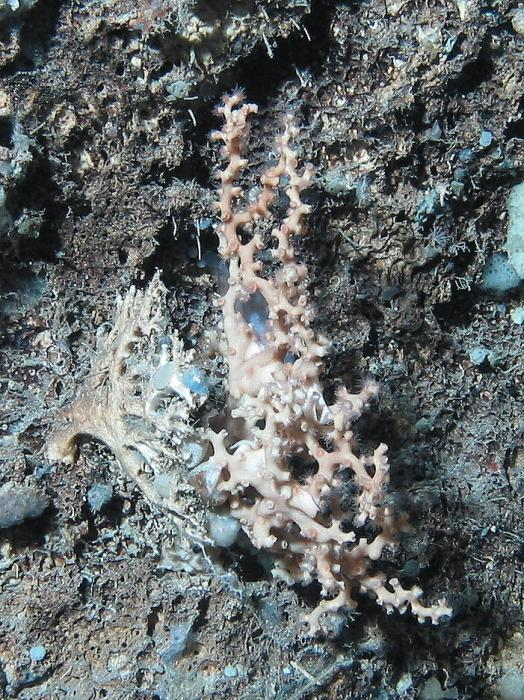
A specimen of Solenosmilia variabeles, a species of coral that forms the base of Tasmanian Seamounts' ecosystem

The Tasmanian Seamounts are an important feature of the south Tasmanian marine environment. While oceans generally contain few nutrients, the presence of seamounts increases the flowing speed of the water current. This effect, created by the topography of the seafloor mountain, clears rocks in the area of sediments and provides food for filter feeders. The swept rocks serve as substrate for sponges and corals to attach to. Among them are some of the longest–living organisms on Earth, reaching an age of "hundreds and possibly thousands of years". The Tasmanian Seamounts in particular are dominated by the stony coral Solenosmilia variabeles; these corals provide a roost and living space for benthic mollusks, echinoderms and crustaceans like stone crabs (Parclamis sp.), squat lobsters (Munidopsis treis), and top snails (Trochidae sp.), thus solidifying the seamounts' ecology. Although many of these species are also found on the continental shelf, they are never found as concentrated or lush as they are on the seamounts.

The seamounts have been the site of commercial trawling for orange roughy for decades. In 1994, the Australian Geological Survey Organization mapped the south Tasmanian seafloor, including the Tasmanian Seamounts; shortly thereafter, Environment Australia (now the Department of Sustainability, Environment, Water, Population and Communities) released a report stating that the Tasmanian Seamount fauna was highly diverse, inadequately studied, and vulnerable to overfishing, and recommended that an oceanic reserve be created on the site. An interim three–year ban on trawling was declared to allow a study of the seamounts to be carried out in 1997 which found 242 distinct species of invertebrates. 26% to 44% of them could not be identified and are thus believed to be new, and about a third are seemingly present only in the seamount environment. Damage from trawling was also examined, and on the most heavily affected seamounts it had destroyed coral aggregations, removed 46% of species, and reduced net biomass by over half.

Following the study, the proposed marine reserve, the Tasmanian Seamount Community or Tasmanian Seamounts Marine Reserve was created as part of the Environment Protection and Biodiversity Conservation Act 1999. The reserve banned fishing, especially trawling, within an area of 370 km^{2} (143 mi^{2}). It contained 70 seamounts, a fifth of the known Tasmanian seamounts, all of which were low-trawl areas and thus still in relatively unaffected form. In a 2007 audit it was merged into the Huon Commonwealth Marine Reserve. A more detailed bathymetric survey the same year found a total of 123 seamounts within the reserve, many of which were previously unknown.
