= Platyops =

Conservation status
- Critically Endangered (IUCN 3.1)

Scientific classification
- Kingdom: Animalia
- Phylum: Arthropoda
- Class: Malacostraca
- Order: Mysida
- Family: Mysidae
- Genus: Platyops; Bacescu & Iliffe, 1986
- Species: P. sterreri

Binomial name
- Platyops sterreri Bacescu & Iliffe, 1986

Genus of crustaceans

Platyops sterreri is a species of crustacean in the family Mysidae, endemic to Bermuda, the only species in the genus Platyops.

== See also ==
- Bermudamysis
