= Americamysis almyra =

Scientific classification
- Kingdom: Animalia
- Phylum: Arthropoda
- Class: Malacostraca
- Order: Mysida
- Family: Mysidae
- Genus: Americamysis
- Species: A. almyra

Binomial name
- Americamysis almyra (Bowman, 1964)

Synonyms
- Mysidopsis almyra Bowman, 1964

Species of crustacean

Americamysis almyra is a shrimp-like crustacean in the order Mysida, the opossum shrimps. It is native to estuarine waters in the western Atlantic Ocean and Gulf of Mexico. It is often referred to in the literature as Mysidopsis almyra.

== Distribution and habitat ==
Americamysis almyra is native to shallow parts of the western Atlantic Ocean and Gulf of Mexico. Its range extends from Maryland to Florida and the whole Gulf of Mexico, and includes the brackish waters of Lake Pontchartrain, St. Andrews Bay and Chesapeake Bay. Its habitat is typically seagrass meadows and shallow marshy areas at depths of less than 4 m (13 ft). It is tolerant of salinities ranging from 0 to 30 psu (practical salinity units) but is usually found in areas with a salinity below 20 psu.

Americamysis almyra was first described from Lake Pontchartrain from specimens collected in 1953. It was identified as being present in St. Johns River Florida in 1977 and was first detected in the Patapsco River flowing into Chesapeake Bay in 1980. It is unclear whether it had invaded these areas, perhaps in the ballast water of ships, or whether it had been there previously but had been misidentified as Americamysis bigelowi.

== Ecology ==
Americamysis almyra is an omnivore and examination of its stomach contents showed that its diet includes 31% vascular plant debris and 11% copepods and diatoms. Opossum shrimps play an important part in the estuarine food chain and are consumed in large quantities by such fish as the striped bass, inland silverside, whiffs and flounders.
