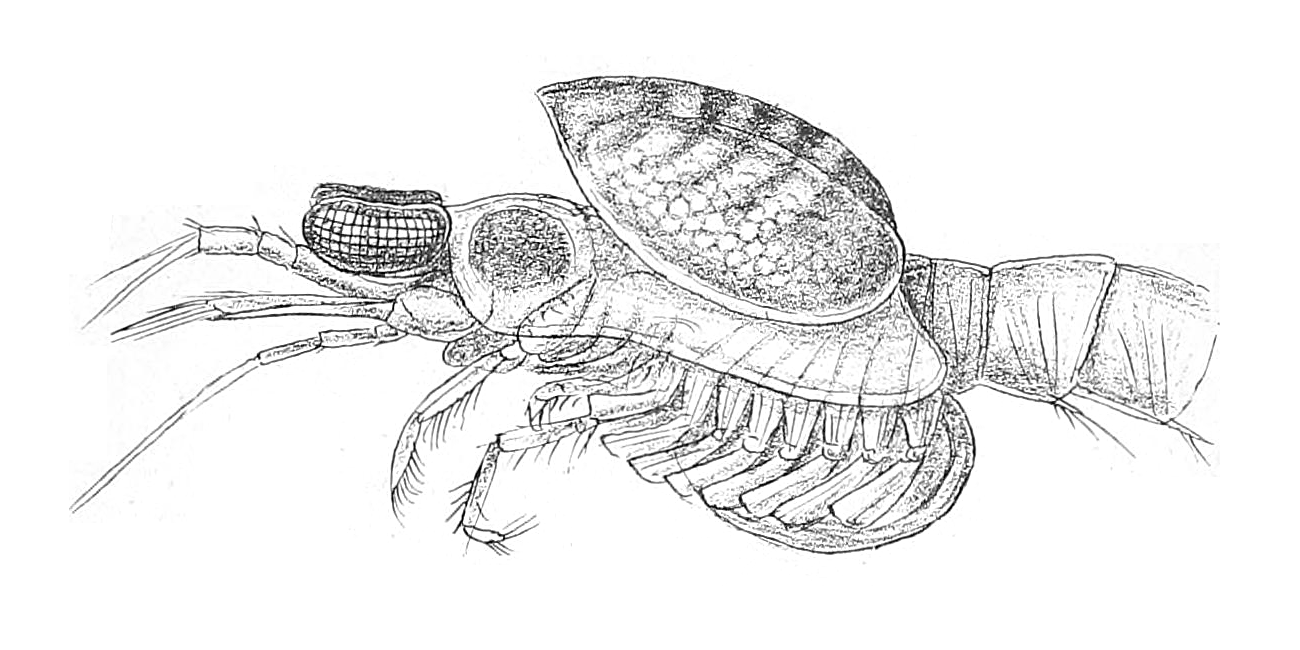
- Erythrops parasitized by a female Aspidophryxus peltatus (Isopoda: Dajidae)

Scientific classification
- Domain: Eukaryota
- Kingdom: Animalia
- Phylum: Arthropoda
- Class: Malacostraca
- Order: Mysida
- Family: Mysidae
- Subfamily: Erythropinae
- Genus: Erythrops; G. O. Sars, 1869

Species
- 17 species (see text)

= Erythrops =

Genus of crustaceans

Erythrops is a genus of marine crustaceans in the family Mysidae.

== Species ==
There are 17 recognized species:

- Erythrops abyssorum G.O. Sars, 1869
- Erythrops africanus O. Tattersall, 1955
- Erythrops alboranus Bacescu, 1989
- Erythrops bidentatus Nouvel, 1973
- Erythrops elegans (G.O. Sars, 1863)
- Erythrops erythrophthalmus (Goës, 1864)
- Erythrops frontieri Nouvel, 1974
- Erythrops glacialis G.O. Sars, 1885
- Erythrops microps (G.O. Sars, 1864)
- Erythrops minutus Hansen, 1910
- Erythrops nanus W. Tattersall, 1922
- Erythrops neapolitanus Colosi, 1929
- Erythrops parvus Brattegard, 1973
- Erythrops peterdohrni Bacescu & Schiecke, 1974
- Erythrops phuketensis Fukuoka & Murano, 2002
- Erythrops serratus (G.O. Sars, 1863)
- Erythrops yongei W. Tattersall, 1936
