= Neobirsteiniamysis =

Scientific classification
- Domain: Eukaryota
- Kingdom: Animalia
- Phylum: Arthropoda
- Class: Malacostraca
- Order: Mysida
- Family: Mysidae
- Subfamily: Boreomysinae
- Genus: Neobirsteiniamysis; Hendrickx & Tchindonova, 2020

Genus of crustaceans

Neobirsteiniamysis is a mysid crustacean genus of the subfamily Boreomysinae of the family Mysidae. Some of the largest mysids. Exclusively deep water. Cosmopolitan. 2 species.

== Description ==
The eyes are lacking cornea, concave laterally, with the microfibrous microstructures on the concave surface. The telson lateral margins are as wide as or wider than the anterion part of the telson. The statocyst is poorly developed.

== Taxonomy ==
Type species of the genus is Petalophthalmus inermis Willemoes-Suhm, 1874. The name comes from the neo- (Greek new) and Birsteiniamysis (the unavailable genus-name, replaced by Neobirsteiniamysis).

== Classification ==
Includes 2 species:

- Neobirsteiniamysis inermis (Willemoes-Suhm, 1874)
- Neobirsteiniamysis caeca (Birstein et Tchindonova, 1958)

== Habitat ==
Neobirsteiniamysis is bathyal-abyssal genus, and thus combines exclusively deep-water oceanic mysids. Depth range 700-7200 m.
