= Walter Medley Tattersall =

British marine biologist (1882–1943)

Walter Medley Tattersall (8 November 1882 – 5 October 1943) was a British zoologist and marine biologist, famous for his study of mysids.

He was born in Liverpool, the eldest son of a draper's family. He studied zoology at the University of Liverpool, where he graduated in 1901. Subsequently, he worked as a naturalist for the Irish Fisheries Department under Ernest William Lyons Holt, where he began his studies of crustaceans. In 1909 he became the director of the Manchester Museum and also worked as a tutor in marine biology at the universities of Manchester and Sheffield.

During World War I, he served as a private in Flanders and France, where he was wounded and gassed in 1918. In the middle of the war, in 1916, he married Olive Selden Attride (1890–1978).

In 1922, he was appointed professor at the University of Cardiff, a post he would hold for the rest of his life. He was highly respected as a teacher in zoology and marine biology and also as a field researcher and taxonomist. Tattersall has an impressive publication record; he is the taxonomic authority for a large number of crustaceans, in particular of mysids and euphausiids. Most of the illustrations in his publications were drawn by his wife Olive who was a notable carcinologist in her own right.

== Selected works ==
- Tattersall, W. M. & O. S. Tattersall (August 2003). British Mysidacea. Pisces Conservation Ltd. ISBN 1-904690-09-2.
