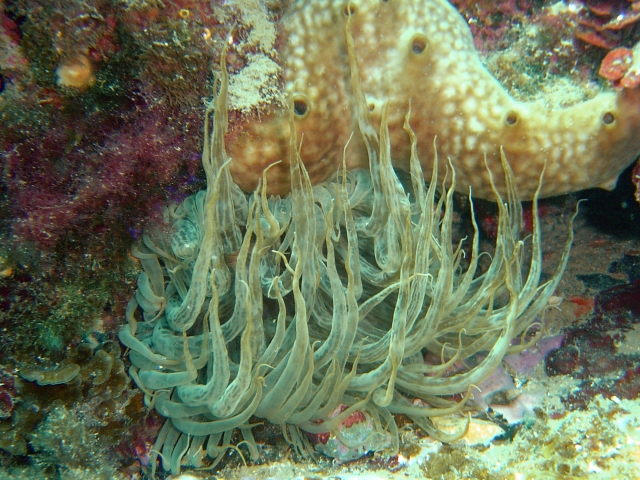
- Aiptasia mutabilis

Scientific classification
- Kingdom: Animalia
- Phylum: Cnidaria
- Subphylum: Anthozoa
- Class: Hexacorallia
- Order: Actiniaria
- Superfamily: Metridioidea
- Family: Aiptasiidae; Carlgren, 1924

Genera
- See text

= Aiptasiidae =

Family of sea anemones

Aiptasiidae is a family of sea anemones, comprising the following genera:

- Aiptasia Gosse, 1858
- Aiptasiogeton Schmidt, 1972
- Bartholomea Duchassaing de Fonbressin & Michelotti, 1864
- Bellactis
- Exaiptasia Grajales & Rodriguez, 2014
- Laviactis Grajales & Rodriguez, 2014
- Neoaiptasia Parulekar, 1969
- Paraiptasia England, 1992
- Paranthea Verrill, 1868

The name (e.g. Verrill) after the genus refers to the researcher that discovered it, and the year is the date of discovery.
