= Huon Commonwealth Marine Reserve =

Australian marine protected area south of Hobart, Tasmania

- IUCN category VI (protected area with sustainable use of natural resources)
- Map showing the Huon Commonwealth Marine Reserve
- Location: Pacific Ocean, Australia
- Nearest town: Cockle Creek, Tasmania
- Coordinates: 44.31°S 147.78°E
- Area: 9,991 km^{2} (3,858 sq mi)
- Established: May 12, 1999
- Governing body: Parks Australia (Commonwealth of Australia)
- Website: environment.gov.au/topics/marine/marine-reserves/south-east/huon

Huon Commonwealth Marine Reserve is a 9,991 km^{2} marine protected area within Australian waters. The former Tasmanian Seamounts Marine Reserve created in 1999 was incorporated into the Huon reserve in 2007, and is part of the South-east Commonwealth Marine Reserve Network.

Huon reserve contains a cluster of approximately 70 seamounts peaking 750 m (2,460 ft) to 1,700 m (5,600 ft) above the sea floor. They appear as cone-shaped submerged mountains, which provide a range of depths for a diversity of plants and animals. The reserve is a foraging area for great white sharks and seabirds and a spawning or nursery area for important commercial fish, including ocean perch and blue warehou.

== Protection ==
A majority of the Huon marine reserve area is IUCN protected area category VI and zoned as 'Multiple Use'. A smaller section of 'Habitat Protection Zone' in the west of the reserve protects the unique and vulnerable benthic communities of the reserve's seamounts.

Zone	IUCN	Activities permitted			Area (km^{2})
Zone	IUCN	Recreational fishing	Commercial fishing	Mining	Area (km^{2})
Habitat Protection	IV	Yes	with approval	No	389
Multiple Use	VI	Yes	with approval	with approval	9,602
(Note: Summary of permitted activities only, see source for details)

== See also ==
- Commonwealth marine reserves
- Protected areas of Australia
- Tasman Sea
