= Boreomysinae =

Scientific classification
- Domain: Eukaryota
- Kingdom: Animalia
- Phylum: Arthropoda
- Class: Malacostraca
- Order: Mysida
- Family: Mysidae
- Subfamily: Boreomysinae; Holt and Tattersall, 1905

Subfamily of crustaceans

Boreomysinae is a subfamily of large, mostly deep-water oceanic mysid crustaceans from the family Mysidae. The name, which can be translated as "northern mysids", comes from the genus Boreomysis G.O. Sars, 1869, established for Boreomysis arctica (Krøyer, 1861) from the boreal waters of Atlantic. As more species have been discovered subsequently, the subfamily is considered panoceanic, and includes 38 species from two genera, Boreomysis and Neobirsteiniamysis Hendrickx et Tchindonova, 2020.

Boreomysinae is a primitive group, uniquely distinguished from other subfamilies of Mysidae by the presence of the seven pairs of oostegites, which can be maximum four in other subfamilies, and by the incomplete proximal suture on the uropodal exopods (either complete and distal or completely absent in the rest of subfamilies).

Boreomysinaes show wide diversity in the structure of eyes, from rather reduced to large with well-developed cornea.

Being an ancient group of crustaceans, possibly originated in the beginning of Mesozoic era, boreomysines are considered living fossils.

== Description ==
Abdominal pleomeres lacking pleural plates. Telson not armed in anterior part, but having apical cleft, lacking plumose setae. Appendix masculina present as slight tubercle with a bunch of setae. Labrum not armed apically; thought its right lobe with inward-bent process. Antennal scale with smooth outer margin, terminating with non-articulated spine. Pereopod endopods not differentiated; only pereopod 1 slightly stronger than others; carpus and propodus divided by oblique articulation; internal articulation of the propodus transverse. Marsupium (brood pouch) made of seven plates (oostegites), present on maxillipeds 2 and all six pereopods of females. Penes tubular. Pleopods reduced to unsegmented plates in females. In males pleopods always well-developed, biramous; endopod 1 non-segmented; other endopods and all five exopods multisegmented; endopods with movable preudobranchial lobe; exopod 3, and sometimes also exopod 2 modified, with stronger and shorter setae on terminal segments. Uropodal exopod with incomplete proximal suture, its segment 1 bearing distolateral spiniform setae; endopod entire, without signs of articulation. Balance organ (statolith) in the endopod of organic composition, somewhat reduced

Boremysine individuals are the largest mysids: body length of some species reaches up to 85 cm.

== Taxonomy ==
Type genus of the subfamily is Boreomysis G.O. Sars, 1869; by original monotypy.

Some authors suggested the suborder or the full family status for boreomysines, but only the subfamily level rank is currently supported.

== Classification ==
The subfamily contains two genera:

- Boreomysis G.O. Sars, 1869
- Neobirsteiniamysis Hendrickx et Tchindonova, 2020

== Phylogeny ==
Boreomysines were originally thought to be close to Leptomysinae, another subfamily with well-developed biramous pleopods. According to molecular genetic studies, Boreomysinae form a monophyletic clade, basal to most of Mysidae, and somewhat close to Rhopalophthalminae, also with articulated uropodal exopod and organic statolith. A detailed comparison suggests them to be structurally more similar to Siriellinae, sharing uropodal exopod articulation, its armature, non-differentiation of pereopods, non-reduction of pleopods and their apical modification.

Their basal position, corresponds to their primitive structure. Estimates of the molecular clock make boremysines some 242,7 million years old.

== Distribution ==
The subfamily is generally cosmopolitan. Boreomysine species are among the most widely distributed mysids. For example, Neobirsteiniamysis inermis is a rare case of bipolar amphitropical species, found in the deep water from Arctic to Antarctic.

== Habitat ==
Boreomysine mysids are mostly deep-water oceanic crustaceans. Certain species, however, have been described from relatively shallow epi- and mesopelagic waters (members of the subgenus Boreomysis (Petryashovia). Some deep-water species also occasionally penetrate epipelagic zone. Some species have also been found in inland seas, like Marmora Sea, thus deviating from purely oceanic habits.
