= Olive Tattersall =

English carcinologist (1890 – 1978)

Olive Selden Tattersall
- Born: Olive Selden Attride; 21 May 1890; Crowthorne
- Died: 3 November 1978 (aged 88); West Sussex
- Education: University of Reading
- Known for: Work on mysidacae
- Spouse: Walter Medley Tattersall
- Scientific career
- Fields: Carcinology
- Author abbrev. (zoology): O.S. Tattersall; O. Tattersall

Olive S. Tattersall (1890 – 1978) was an English carcinologist focusing especially on the Mysidacea family of crustaceans. After holding medical positions in both World Wars, she began making scientific publications in her sixties.

== Early life ==
She was born Olive Selden Attride on 21 May 1890 at Crowthorne, Berkshire, the youngest child of iron founder William Henry Attride. She studied science at Reading University College from 1907 to 1911, gaining her BSc as an external student at London University, as Reading was yet to gain full university status.

She then obtained the Cambridge Teaching Diploma and taught science at Maidenhead Girls' School from 1912 to 1914.

During World War I, she served as a nurse at a military hospital in Salford, Lancashire from 1916 to 1916. She then worked as an engineer’s draughtsman at a munition works after her marriage to Walter Medley Tattersall, an employee of Manchester University Museum who was then serving with the Royal Garrison Artillery. She cared for her husband when he returned wounded from France in 1918.

From 1922 to 1939 she worked as Walter’s 'draughtsman, typist and handywoman' while he was professor of zoology at University College, Cardiff. She produced the illustrations for his publications, and her help allowed him to continue being productive when he became diabetic from 1930.

During World War II she served as an ARP Fire Fighting Officer and lecturer and as Liaison Officer for the Red Cross at Whitchurch Hospital, Glamorgan.

== Scientific career ==
After Walter’s death in 1943, Olive completed and illustrated The British Mysidacae (1951), which he had been working on. For this work she was awarded a D.Sc. from London University.

Relocating to Hayling Island, Hampshire, she continued her research, including a project to sort a collection of 5000 mysid specimens belonging to the Discovery Investigations, during which she drove the specimens in batches across the isthmus to the island to sort them at home. This project resulted in the description of two new genera and 28 new species, which she published as 'Mysidacae' (1955).

Her contributions to the field of carcinology involved publishing and illustrating reports on the collections sent to her from around the world, and visiting marine biological laboratories in the United States National Museum, Naples, Nanaimo, Krusadi, and Johannesburg. She named 63 species and two genera of mysids.

She died on 3 November 1978 after donating her library and collection of Mysidacae to the Natural History Museum.

== Select publications ==
- The British Mysidacea (1951)
- Eight papers by O.S. Tattersall in publications of the Zoological Society of London
