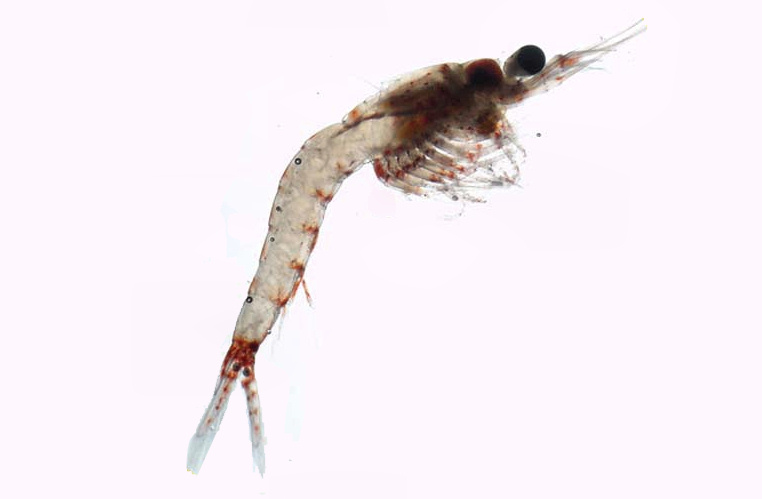
- Hemimysis anomala

Scientific classification
- Kingdom: Animalia
- Phylum: Arthropoda
- Clade: Pancrustacea
- Class: Malacostraca
- Order: Mysida
- Family: Mysidae; Haworth, 1825

Subfamilies
- Boreomysinae Holt & Tattersall, 1905; Erythropinae Hansen, 1910; Gastrosaccinae Norman, 1892; Heteromysinae Norman, 1892; Leptomysinae Hansen, 1910; Mancomysinae Bacescu & Iliffe, 1986; Mysidellinae Czerniavsky, 1882; Mysinae Haworth, 1825; Rhopalophthalminae Hansen, 1910; Siriellinae Norman, 1892

= Mysidae =

Family of crustaceans

Mysidae is the largest family of crustaceans in the order Mysida, with over 1000 species in around 170 genera.

== Characteristics ==
Members of the family Mysidae are distinguished from other mysids by the fact that the first pereopod (walking leg) has a well-developed exopod (outer branch), the carpopropodus of the endopod (inner branch) of the 3rd to 8th pereopods is divided into sub-segments and there are statocysts on the endopod of the uropods (posterior appendages). Female petalophthalmidans have two or three oostegites (flexible bristly flaps) forming the base of the marsupium or brood pouch under the thorax, apart from the subfamily Boreomysinae, which has seven pairs of oostegites.

== Subfamilies and genera ==
The following subfamilies and genera are recognised:

Boreomysinae Holt & Tattersall, 1905

- Neobirsteiniamysis Hendrickx et Tchindonova, 2020
- Boreomysis G. O. Sars, 1869

Erythropinae Hansen, 1910

- Aberomysis Băcescu & Iliffe, 1986
- Amathimysis Brattegard, 1969
- Amblyops G. O. Sars, 1872
- Amblyopsoides O. S. Tattersall, 1955
- Arachnomysis Chun, 1887
- Atlanterythrops Nouvel & Lagardère, 1976
- Australerythrops W. Tattersall, 1928
- Caesaromysis Ortmann, 1893
- Chunomysis Holt & Tattersall, 1905
- Dactylamblyops Holt & Tattersall, 1906
- Dactylerythrops Holt & Tattersall, 1905
- Echinomysides Murano, 1977
- Echinomysis Illig, 1905
- Erythrops G. O. Sars, 1869
- Euchaetomera G. O. Sars, 1883
- Euchaetomeropsis W. Tattersall, 1909
- Gibbamblyops Murano & Krygier, 1985
- Gibberythrops Illig, 1930
- Gymnerythrops Hansen, 1910
- Heteroerythrops O. Tattersall, 1955
- Holmesiella Ortmann, 1908
- Hyperamblyops Birstein & Tchindonova, 1958
- Hypererythrops Holt & Tattersall, 1905
- Illigiella Murano, 1981
- Indoerythrops Panampunnayil, 1998
- Katerythrops Holt & Tattersall, 1905
- Liuimysis Wang, 1998
- Longithorax Illig, 1906
- Marumomysis Murano, 1999
- Meierythrops Murano, 1981
- Metamblyops W. Tattersall, 1907
- Meterythrops S. I. Smith, 1879
- Michthyops Tattersall, 1911
- Mysimenzies Băcescu, 1971
- Nakazawaia Murano, 1981
- Neoamblyops Fukuoka, 2009
- Nipponerythrops Murano, 1977
- Paramblyops Holt & Tattersall, 1905
- Parapseudomma Nouvel & Lagardère, 1976
- Parerythrops G. O. Sars, 1869
- Pleurerythrops Ii, 1964
- Pseudamblyops Ii, 1964
- Pseuderythrops Coifmann, 1936
- Pseudomma G. O. Sars, 1870
- Pteromysis Ii, 1964
- Scolamblyops Murano, 1974
- Shenimysis Wang, 1998
- Synerythrops Hansen, 1910
- Teratamblyops Murano, 2001
- Teraterythrops Ii, 1964
- Thalassomysis W. Tattersall, 1939
- Xenerythrops Ii, 1964

Gastrosaccinae Norman, 1892

- Anchialina Norman & Scott, 1906
- Archaeomysis Czerniavsky, 1882
- Chlamydopleon Ortmann, 1893
- Coifmanniella Heard & Price, 2006
- Eurobowmaniella Murano, 1995
- Gastrosaccus Norman, 1868
- Haplostylus Kossmann, 1880
- Iiella Băcescu, 1968
- Paranchialina Hansen, 1910
- Pseudanchialina Hansen, 1910

Heteromysinae Norman, 1892

- Bermudamysis Băcescu & Iliffe, 1986
- Burrimysis Jaume & Garcia, 1993
- Deltamysis Bowman & Orsi, 1992
- Heteromysis S. I. Smith, 1873
- Heteromysoides Băcescu, 1968
- Ischiomysis Wittmann, 2013
- Mysidetes Holt & Tattersall, 1906
- Mysifaun Wittmann, 1996
- Platymysis Brattegard, 1980
- Platyops Băcescu & Iliffe, 1986
- Pseudomysidetes W. Tattersall, 1936
- Retromysis Wittmann, 2004

Leptomysinae Hansen, 1910

- Afromysis Zimmer, 1916
- Americamysis Price, Heard & Stuck, 1994
- Antichthomysis Fenton, 1991
- Australomysis W. Tattersall, 1927
- Bathymysis W. Tattersall, 1907
- Brasilomysis Băcescu, 1968
- Calyptomma W. Tattersall, 1909
- Ceratodoxomysis Murano, 2003
- Cubanomysis Băcescu, 1968
- Dioptromysis Zimmer, 1915
- Doxomysis Hansen, 1912
- Harmelinella Ledoyer, 1989
- Hyperiimysis Nouvel, 1966
- Iimysis Nouvel, 1966
- Leptomysis G. O. Sars, 1869
- Megalopsis Panampunnayil, 1987
- Metamysidopsis W. Tattersall, 1951
- Mysideis G. O. Sars, 1869
- Mysidopsis G. O. Sars, 1864
- Neobathymysis Bravo & Murano, 1996
- Neodoxomysis Murano, 1999
- Notomysis Wittmann, 1986
- Nouvelia Băcescu & Vasilescu, 1973
- Paraleptomysis Liu & Wang, 1983
- Prionomysis W. Tattersall, 1922
- Proleptomysis Wittmann, 1985
- Promysis Dana, 1850
- Pseudomysis G. O. Sars, 1879
- Pseudoxomysis Nouvel, 1973
- Pyroleptomysis Wittmann, 1985
- Rostromysis Panampunnayil, 1987
- Tenagomysis Thomson, 1900

Mancomysinae Băcescu & Iliffe, 1986

- Palaumysis Băcescu & Iliffe, 1986

Mysidellinae Czerniavsky, 1882

- Mysidella G. O. Sars, 1872

Mysinae Haworth, 1825

- Acanthomysis Czerniavsky, 1882
- Alienacanthomysis Holmquist, 1981
- Anisomysis Hansen, 1910
- Antarctomysis Coutière, 1906
- Antromysis Creaser, 1936
- Arthromysis Colosi, 1924
- Boreoacanthomysis Fukuoka & Murano, 2004
- Carnegieomysis W. Tattersall, 1943
- Caspiomysis G. O. Sars, 1907
- Columbiaemysis Holmquist, 1982
- Diamysis Czerniavsky, 1882
- Disacanthomysis Holmquist, 1981
- Exacanthomysis Holmquist, 1981
- Gangemysis Derzhavin, 1924
- Gironomysis Ortiz, García-Debrás & Pérez, 1997
- Halemysis Băcescu & Udrescu, 1984
- Hemiacanthomysis Fukuoka & Murano, 2002
- Hemimysis G. O. Sars, 1869
- Hippacanthomysis Murano & Chess, 1987
- Holmesimysis Holmquist, 1979
- Hyperacanthomysis Fukuoka & Murano, 2000
- Hyperstilomysis Fukuoka, Bravo & Murano, 2005
- Idiomysis W. Tattersall, 1922
- Indomysis W. Tattersall, 1914
- Inusitatomysis Ii, 1940
- Javanisomysis Băcescu, 1992
- Kainommatomysis W. Tattersall, 1927
- Katamysis G. O. Sars, 1893
- Keslerella Czerniavsky, 1882
- Limnomysis Czerniavsky, 1882
- Lycomysis Hansen, 1910
- Macromysis White, 1847
- Mesacanthomysis Nouvel, 1967
- Mesopodopsis Czerniavsky, 1882
- Mysidium Dana, 1852
- Mysis Latreille, 1802
- Nanomysis W. Tattersall, 1921
- Neomysis Czerniavsky, 1882
- Nipponomysis Takahashi & Murano, 1986
- Notacanthomysis Fukuoka & Murano, 2000
- Orientomysis Derzhavin, 1913
- Pacifacanthomysis Holmquist, 1981
- Paracanthomysis Ii, 1936
- Paramesopodopsis Fenton, 1985
- Paramysis Czerniavsky, 1882
- Parapodopsis Czerniavsky, 1882
- Parastilomysis Ii, 1936
- Parvimysis Brattegard, 1969
- Praunus Leach, 1814
- Proneomysis W. Tattersall, 1933
- Sarmysis Maissuradze & Popescu, 1987
- Schistomysis Norman, 1892
- Stilomysis Norman, 1894
- Surinamysis Bowman, 1977
- Taphromysis Banner, 1953
- Tasmanomysis Fenton, 1985
- Telacanthomysis Fukuoka & Murano, 2001
- Troglomysis Stammer, 1933
- Xenacanthomysis Holmquist, 1980

Rhopalophthalminae Hansen, 1910

- Rhopalophthalmus Illig, 1906

Siriellinae Norman, 1892

- Hemisiriella Hansen, 1910
- Metasiriella Murano, 1986
- Siriella Dana, 1850

== See also ==
- Heteromysis actiniae
