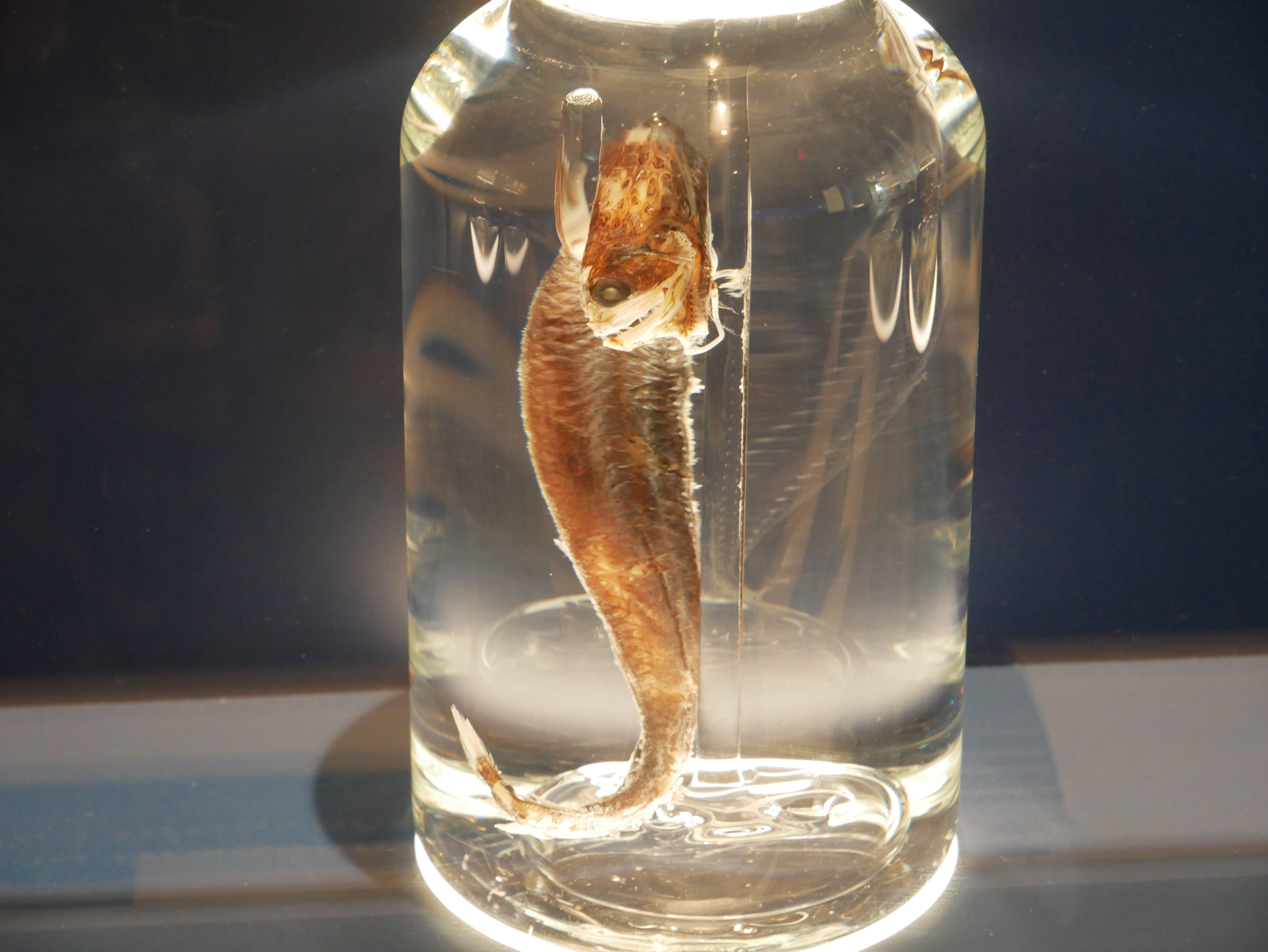
- Preserved Specimen

Conservation status
- Least Concern (IUCN 3.1)

Scientific classification
- Kingdom: Animalia
- Phylum: Chordata
- Class: Actinopterygii
- Order: Stomiiformes
- Family: Stomiidae
- Genus: Stomias
- Species: S. boa

Binomial name
- Stomias boa (Risso, 1810)

Synonyms
- Esox boa Risso, 1810; Stomias bonapartei Fowler, 1912; Stomias elongatus atlanticus Pappenheim, 1912; Stomiasunculus barbatus Kaup, 1860

= Stomias boa =

Species of fish

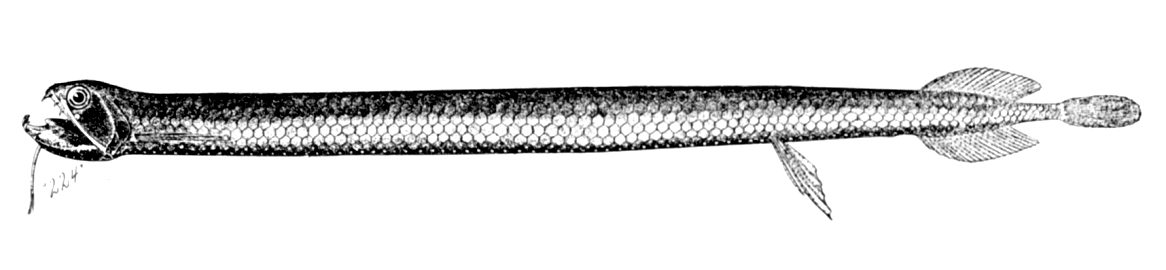
S. boa ferox

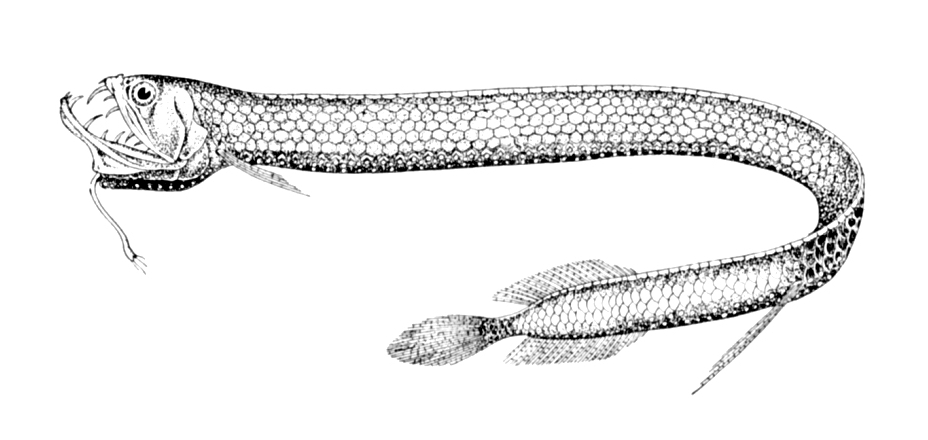
S. boa boa

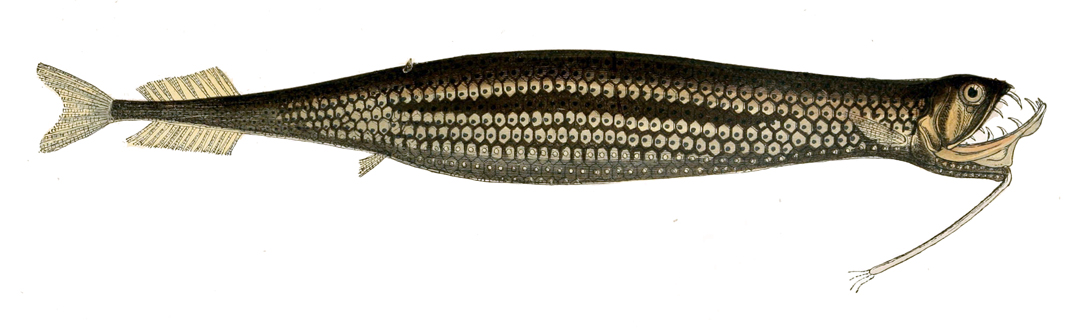
S. boa boa: the hexagonal areas above the photophores are visible.

Stomias boa, also known as the boa dragonfish, scaly dragonfish, dragon-boa or boa scaly dragonfish, is a species of deep-sea fish in the family Stomiidae. It is found at great depths worldwide in tropical to temperate oceans but is absent from the northern Pacific and northwest Atlantic Oceans.

== Taxonomy ==
Three subspecies were previously recognised:

- Stomias boa boa (A. Risso, 1810)
- Stomias boa colubrinus (Garman, 1899)
- Stomias boa ferox (J. C. H. Reinhardt, 1842)

These and two others have been elevated to species.

- Stomias boa boa (Risso, 1810) is now Stomias boa (Risso, 1810)
- Stomias boa colubrinus Garman, 1899 is now Stomias colubrinus Garman, 1899
- Stomias boa danae Ege, 1933 is now Stomias danae Ege, 1933
- Stomias boa ferox Reinhardt, 1842 is now Stomias ferox Reinhardt, 1842
- Stomias boa gracilis Garman, 1899 is now Stomias gracilis Garman, 1899

== Description ==
Stomias boa has an elongated body and small head; it is up to 32.2 cm (1.06 ft) in length, black underneath and iridescent silver on its flanks, with a barbel that has a pale stem, dark spot at base of bulb and three blackish filaments. It has six rows of hexagonal areas above a lateral series of large photophores. The dorsal and anal fins are opposite each other, just anterior to the caudal fin.

The mouth has a protuberant lower jaw and sharp, pointed teeth. There is a large fleshy barbel projecting from the chin with a pale stalk, a dark spot at the base of the bulb and a dark filament. The dorsal fin has no spines and 17 to 22 soft rays and the anal fin has 18 to 22 soft rays. The dorsal and anal fins are positioned on the slender caudal peduncle and the caudal fin is forked. The skin is covered in small hexagonal scales. Like many fish of deep oceans, it has large eyes and is transparent and silvery in appearance with iridescent speckles.

== Distribution and habitat ==
Stomias boa is mesopelagic and bathypelagic, living at depths of 200–2,173 m (656–7,129 ft) in seas worldwide in a band 20°–45° S, particularly off the Atlantic coast of North America, in the western Mediterranean, the west coast of Africa as far south as Mauritania and southern Africa from Angola to the Cape of Good Hope. On the other side of the Atlantic it is found from the Northwest Territories of Canada to Argentina. It is also known from Chile and the sub-Antarctic region of the Indian Ocean south to Heard Island.

The related S. colubrinus is most common off the Congo coast and the northwest coast of South America.

It usually inhabits waters deeper than 1,000 metres (3,280 ft) in the daytime but migrates upwards towards the surface during the night.

== Diet ==
Stomias boa eats midwater fishes and crustaceans; it rises to near the surface to feed at night.

== Ecology ==
It is itself preyed on by the deepwater hakes Merluccius paradoxus and Merluccius capensis, the blackmouth catshark Galeus melastomus and the swordfish Xiphias gladius.

Stomias boa boa has large light-producing photophores behind the eyes and other smaller ones scattered across the body in a geometrical pattern, mostly on the ventral surface. Special organs near the eyes detect the amount of illumination in the surrounding water and this enables the fish to adjust the amount of light its photophores emit. The bioluminescence can be turned on and off at will and may confuse potential predators. Other species of fish emit light in a similar way, and the particular arrangement of photophores in the scaly dragonfish permits individuals to identify other fish of the same species.

== Reproduction ==
Stomias boa is oviparous; its larvae are 9–44 mm (0.35–1.73 in) in length.
