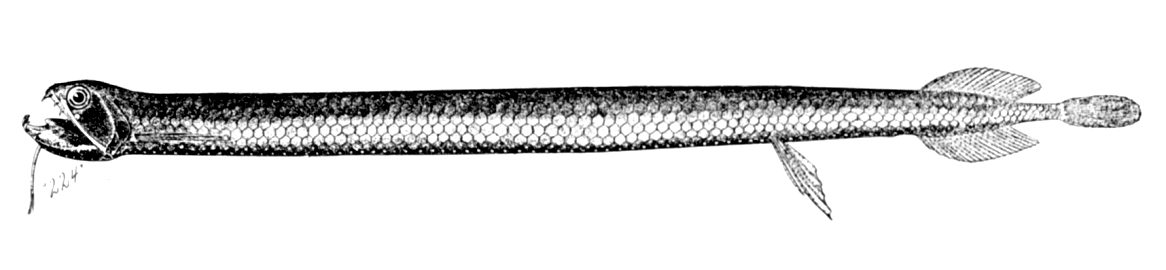

Conservation status
- Least Concern (IUCN 3.1)

Scientific classification
- Domain: Eukaryota
- Kingdom: Animalia
- Phylum: Chordata
- Class: Actinopterygii
- Order: Stomiiformes
- Family: Stomiidae
- Genus: Stomias
- Species: S. ferox
- Subspecies: S. f.

Trinomial name
- Stomias ferox Reinhardt, 1842

Synonyms
- Stomias boa ferox Reinhardt, 1842

= Stomias ferox =

Subspecies of fish

Stomias ferox is a subspecies of deep-sea fish in the family Stomiidae.

== Description ==
Stomias ferox has an elongated body and small head; it is up to 30 cm (0.98 ft) in length, black underneath and iridescent silver on its flanks, with a barbel that has a pale stem, dark spot at base of bulb and three blackish filaments. It has six rows of hexagonal areas above a lateral series of large photophores. The dorsal and anal fins are opposite each other, just anterior to the caudal fin. It can be distinguished from the S. boa boa subspecies by its larger number of photophores.

== Name ==
The subspecies name ferox means "wild, ferocious." It is sometimes called dragon-boa, dragonfish or boa dragonfish, but those names are equally applied to Stomias boa as a species, or the S. boa boa subspecies. In Icelandic it is marsnákur ("sea snake") and in Norwegian storkjeft ("big jaw").

== Distribution and habitat ==
Stomias ferox is mesopelagic and bathypelagic, living at depths of 20–800 m (66–2,625 ft), concentrated in the north Atlantic.

== Diet ==
Stomias ferox eats midwater fishes and crustaceans; it rises to near the surface to feed at night. It positions itself horizontally in the water column with pelvic and pectoral fins spread wide and barbel pointing forward.

== Reproduction ==
Stomias ferox is oviparous.
