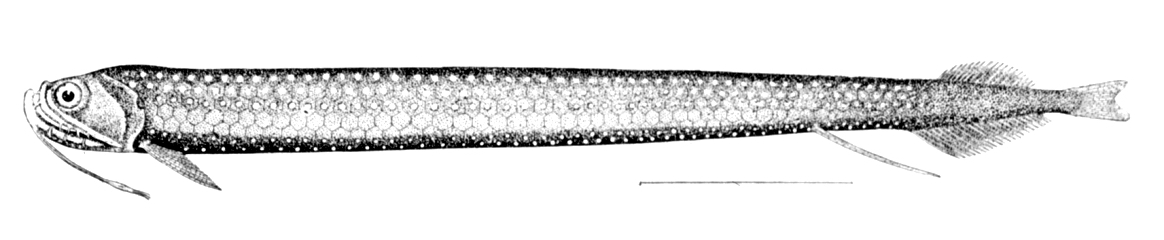
- Gunther's boafish (S. affinis)
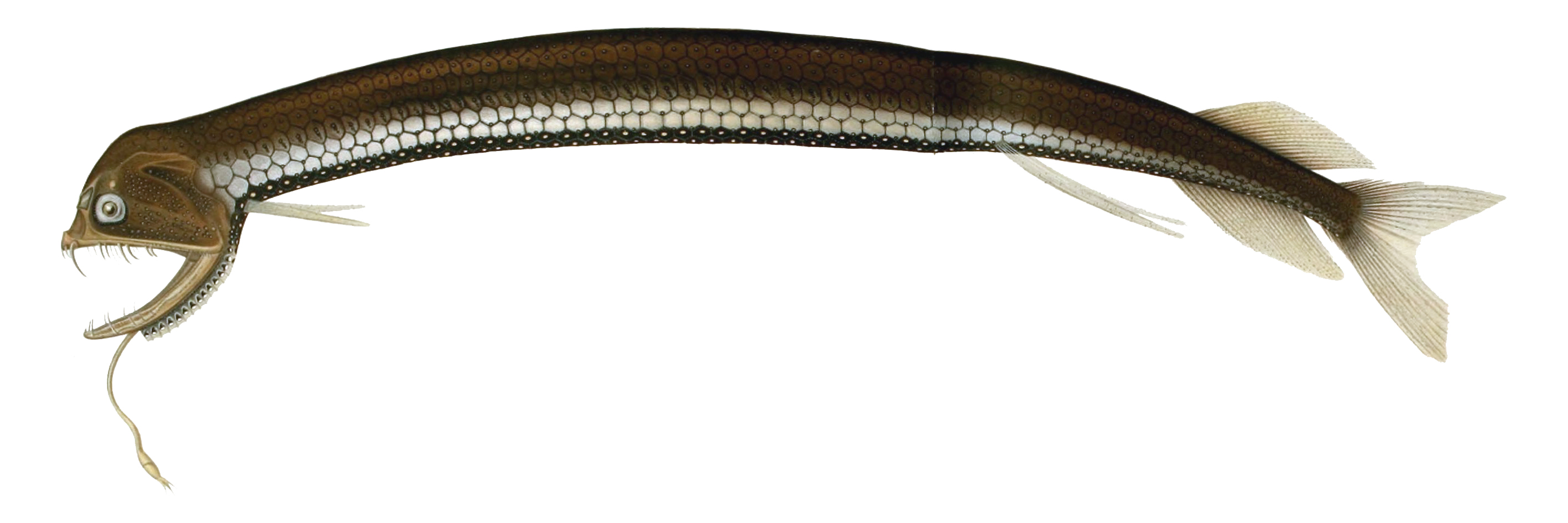
- Boa dragonfish (S. boa boa)

Scientific classification
- Kingdom: Animalia
- Phylum: Chordata
- Class: Actinopterygii
- Order: Stomiiformes
- Family: Stomiidae
- Subfamily: Stomiinae
- Genus: Stomias; G. Cuvier, 1816

= Stomias =

Genus of fishes

Stomias is a genus of barbeled dragonfishes. They live in the mesopelagic zone of all oceans and show diel vertical migration and sexual dimorphism (males are smaller, have larger eyes and larger postorbital photophores than females.

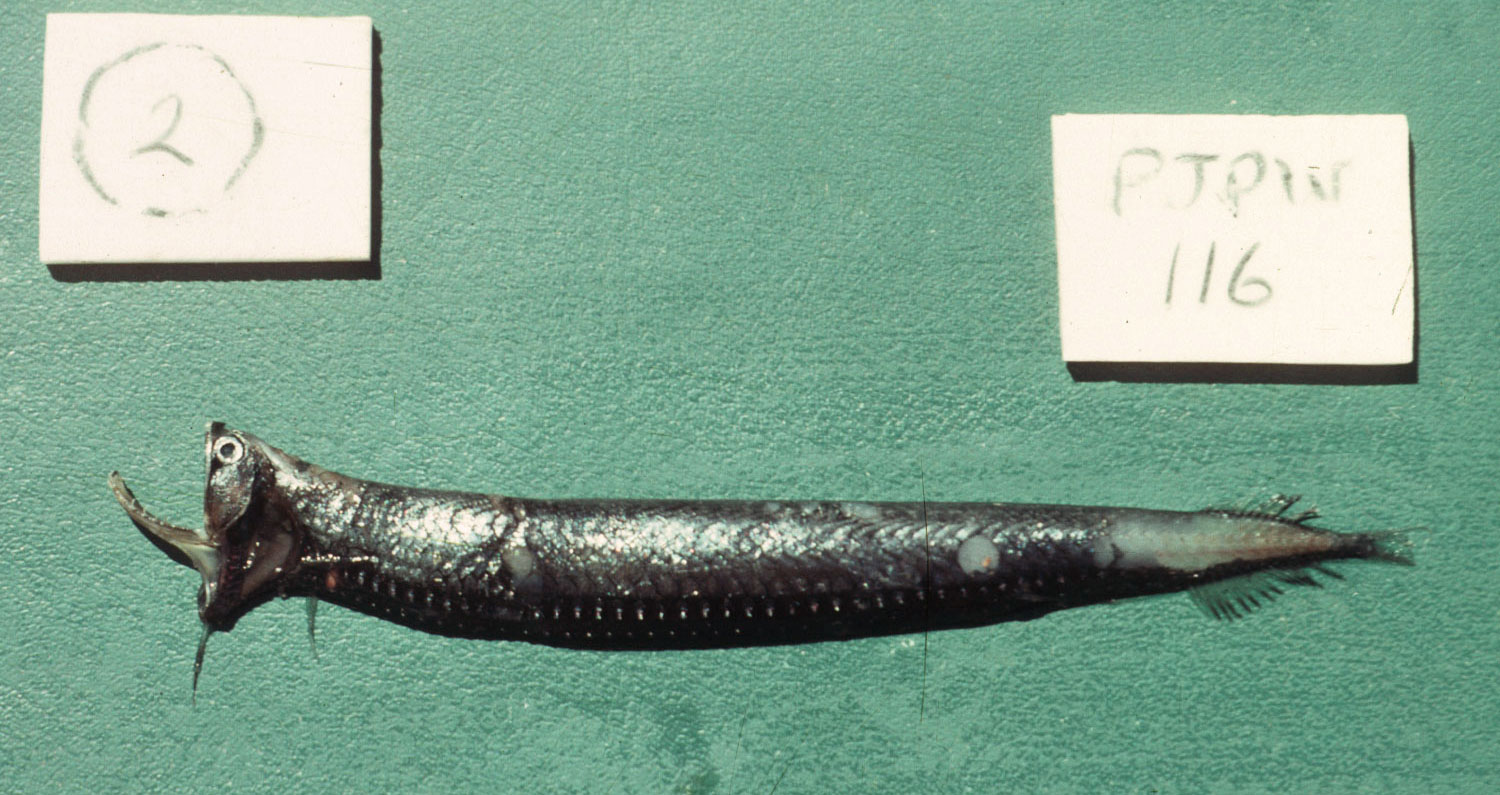
Alcock's boafish, S. nebulosus

== Species ==
There are currently nine recognized species in this genus:

- Stomias affinis Günther, 1887 (Günther's boafish)
- Stomias atriventer Garman, 1899 (Black-belly dragonfish)
- Stomias boa (A. Risso, 1810)
  - Stomias boa boa (A. Risso, 1810) (Boa dragonfish)
  - Stomias boa colubrinus Garman, 1899
  - Stomias boa ferox J. C. H. Reinhardt, 1842
- Stomias brevibarbatus Ege, 1918
- Stomias danae Ege, 1933
- Stomias gracilis Garman, 1899
- Stomias lampropeltis Gibbs, 1969
- Stomias longibarbatus (A. B. Brauer, 1902) (Longbarb scaly dragonfish)
- Stomias nebulosus Alcock, 1889 (Alcock's boafish)
