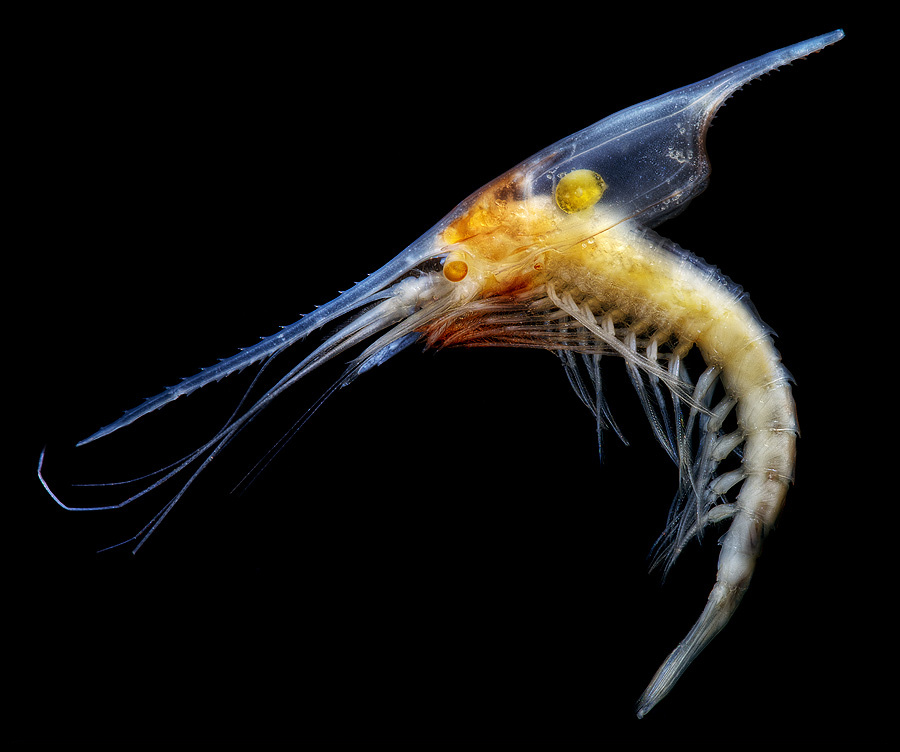
- Gnathophausia zoea

Scientific classification
- Domain: Eukaryota
- Kingdom: Animalia
- Phylum: Arthropoda
- Class: Malacostraca
- Order: Lophogastrida
- Family: Lophogastridae

= Lophogastridae =

Family of crustaceans

Lophogastridae is a family of crustaceans belonging to the order Lophogastrida.

Genera:

- Ceratolepis G.O.Sars, 1883
- Chalaraspidum Willemoes-Suhm, 1895
- Gnathophausia Willemoes-Suhm, 1873
- Lophogaster M.Sars, 1857
- Neognathophausia Petryashov, 1992
- Paralophogaster Hansen, 1910
- Pseudochalaraspidum Birstein & Tchindonova, 1962
- Sarsius Tonini, da Silva, Serpa Filho & Freitas, 2016
