= Rhycherus gloveri =

Scientific classification
- Kingdom: Animalia
- Phylum: Chordata
- Class: Actinopterygii
- Order: Lophiiformes
- Family: Antennariidae
- Genus: Rhycherus
- Species: R. gloveri

Binomial name
- Rhycherus gloveri Pietsch, 1984

Species of fish found in Australian waters

Rhycherus gloveri, known as Glover's anglerfish, is a species of fish in the family Antennariidae. It is endemic to Australia, where it occurs in rocky reef environments on the country's southern and western coasts. It reaches 16 cm (6.3 in) in total length, and it differs from its close relative R. filamentosus in illicium length and escal morphology. It was named for Dr. C.J.M. Glover (1935-1992), a former ichthyologist of the South Australian Museum.
