= Stomias lampropeltis =

Conservation status
- Least Concern (IUCN 3.1)

Scientific classification
- Domain: Eukaryota
- Kingdom: Animalia
- Phylum: Chordata
- Class: Actinopterygii
- Order: Stomiiformes
- Family: Stomiidae
- Genus: Stomias
- Species: S. lampropeltis

Binomial name
- Stomias lampropeltis Gibbs, 1969

Species of fish

Stomias lampropeltis is a species of deep-sea fish in the genus Stomias. The species has been documented in the Atlantic Ocean, and fully-grown adults can reach a maximum length of ~29.7 centimetres (11.7 in).
