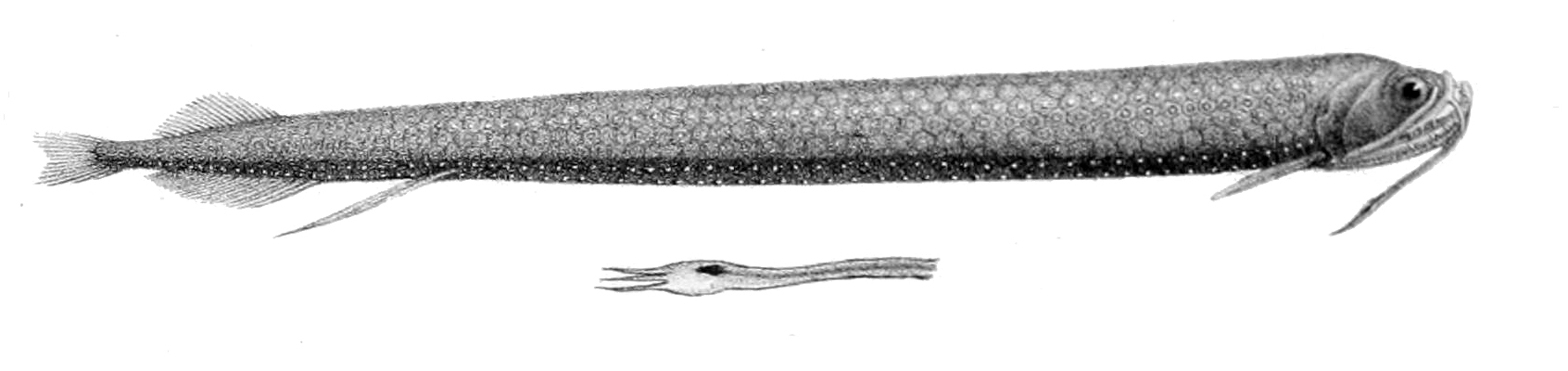

Conservation status
- Least Concern (IUCN 3.1)

Scientific classification
- Kingdom: Animalia
- Phylum: Chordata
- Class: Actinopterygii
- Order: Stomiiformes
- Family: Stomiidae
- Genus: Stomias
- Species: S. affinis

Binomial name
- Stomias affinis Günther, 1887

= Stomias affinis =

Species of fish

Stomias affinis, also known as Gunther's boafish, is a deep-sea mesopelagic fish species in the family Stomiidae. They inhabit the open seas in the equatorial zones of the Atlantic, Indian and Pacific Oceans.

== Description ==
Stomias affinis is an elongated, slender, barbeled dragonfish and is a sexually dimorphic species. Females are larger, averaging a maximum length of 204 millimetres (8.0 in) while males average up to 130 millimetres (5.1 in). It has a short barbel on its chin and a few illuminated photophores between its lateral and ventral rows. The fish's stomach is caramel in color with white spots and constitutes seventy-five percent of the total body length.

== Distribution and habitat ==
Stomias affinis geographic findings include the Arabian Sea, Celebes Sea, the Gulf of Aden, Socotra, the Somali coast and the South China Sea. They are a vertically distributed species that inhabit open ocean between 100 metres (330 ft) to over 1,000 metres (3,300 ft). They share the same habitat area as Stomias nebuloses and are not suited for living in a low-oxygen environment. They inhabit deeper water during the day and are found above 150m during the night.

== Diet ==
Diet consists of mostly myctophid fishes including the Diaphus genus and other small unidentified fish as well as decapods. It is estimated that at least one myctophid is eaten every twelve days.
