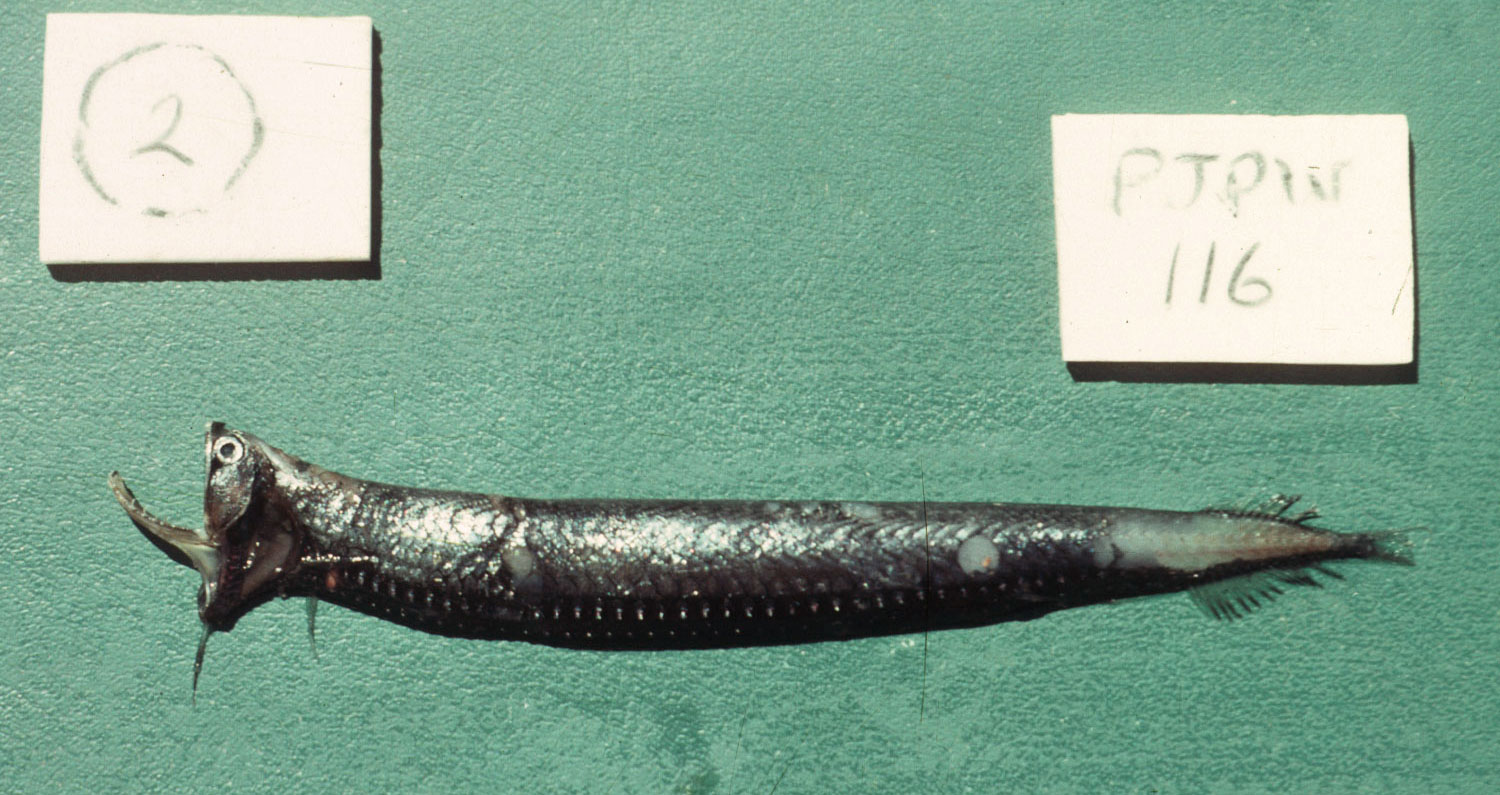

Conservation status
- Least Concern (IUCN 3.1)

Scientific classification
- Kingdom: Animalia
- Phylum: Chordata
- Class: Actinopterygii
- Order: Stomiiformes
- Family: Stomiidae
- Genus: Stomias
- Species: S. nebulosus

Binomial name
- Stomias nebulosus Alcock, 1889

= Stomias nebulosus =

Species of fish

Stomias nebulosus is a species of deep-sea fish in the genus Stomias. The species has been documented in the Indo-Pacific Ocean.
