= Eucopiidae =

Scientific classification
- Domain: Eukaryota
- Kingdom: Animalia
- Phylum: Arthropoda
- Class: Malacostraca
- Order: Lophogastrida
- Family: Eucopiidae

Family of crustaceans

Eucopiidae is a family of crustaceans belonging to the order Lophogastrida.

Genera:

- Eucopia Dana, 1852
- Schimperella Bill, 1914
- Vicluvia Larghi, Tintori, Basso, Danini & Felber, 2019
- Yunnanocopia Feldmann, Schweitzer, Hu, Huang, Zhou, Zhang, Wen, Xie, Schram & Jones, 2016
