= Oxygen minimum zone =

Zone in which oxygen saturation in seawater in the ocean is at its lowest

The oxygen minimum zone (OMZ), sometimes referred to as the shadow zone, is the zone in which oxygen saturation in seawater in the ocean is at its lowest. This zone occurs at depths of about 200 to 1,500 m (700–4,900 ft), depending on local circumstances. OMZs are found worldwide, typically along the western coast of continents, in areas where an interplay of physical and biological processes concurrently lower the oxygen concentration (biological processes) and restrict the water from mixing with surrounding waters (physical processes), creating a "pool" of water where oxygen concentrations fall from the normal range of 4–6 mg/L to below 2 mg/L.

== Physical and biological processes ==
Surface ocean waters generally have oxygen concentrations close to equilibrium with the Earth's atmosphere. In general, colder waters hold more oxygen than warmer waters. As water moves out of the mixed layer into the thermocline, it is exposed to a rain of organic matter from above. Aerobic bacteria feed on this organic matter; oxygen is used as part of the bacterial metabolic process, lowering its concentration within the water. Therefore, the concentration of oxygen in deep water is dependent on the amount of oxygen it had when it was at the surface, minus depletion by deep sea organisms.

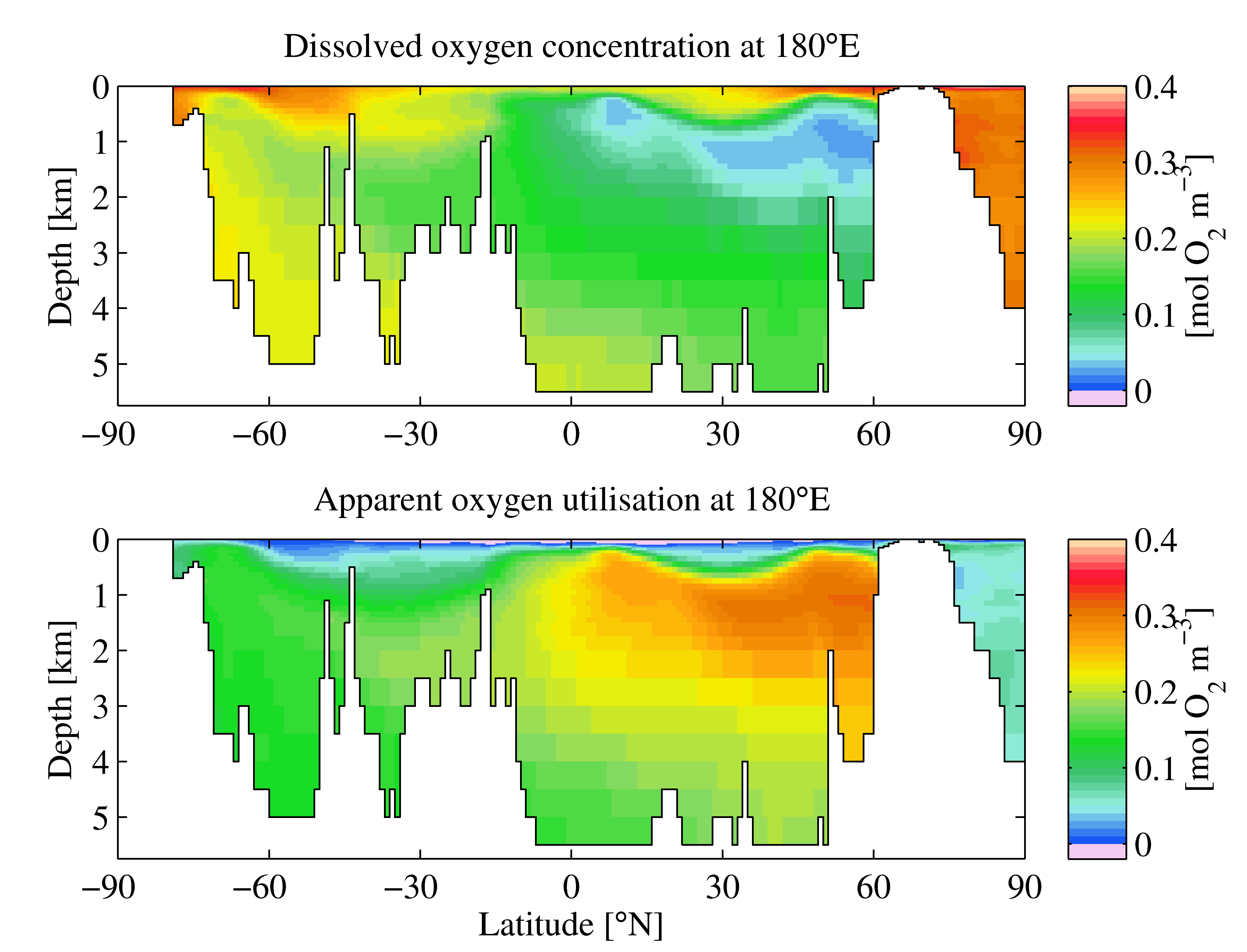
Annual mean dissolved oxygen (upper panel) and apparent oxygen utilisation (lower panel) from the World Ocean Atlas. The data plotted show a section running north–south at the 180th meridian (approximately the centre of the Pacific Ocean). White regions indicate section bathymetry. In the upper panel a minimum in oxygen content is indicated by light blue shading between 0° (equator) and 60°N at an average depth of ca. 1,000 m (3,300 ft).

The downward flux of organic matter decreases sharply with depth, with 80–90% being consumed in the top 1,000 m (3,300 ft). The deep ocean thus has higher oxygen because rates of oxygen consumption are low compared with the supply of cold, oxygen-rich deep waters from polar regions. In the surface layers, oxygen is supplied by photosynthesis of phytoplankton. Depths in between, however, have higher rates of oxygen consumption and lower rates of advective supply of oxygen-rich waters. In much of the ocean, mixing processes enable the resupply of oxygen to these waters (see upwelling).

A distribution of the open-ocean oxygen minimum zones is controlled by the large-scale ocean circulation as well as local physical as well as biological processes. For example, wind blowing parallel to the coast causes Ekman transport that upwells nutrients from deep water. The increased nutrients support phytoplankton blooms, zooplankton grazing, and an overall productive food web at the surface. The byproducts of these blooms and the subsequent grazing sink in the form of particulate and dissolved nutrients (from phytodetritus, dead organisms, fecal pellets, excretions, shed shells, scales, and other parts). This "rain" of organic matter (see the biological pump) feeds the microbial loop and may lead to bacterial blooms in water below the euphotic zone due to the influx of nutrients. Since oxygen is not being produced as a byproduct of photosynthesis below the euphotic zone, these microbes use up what oxygen is in the water as they break down the falling organic matter thus creating the lower oxygen conditions.

Physical processes then constrain the mixing and isolate this low oxygen water from outside water. Vertical mixing is constrained due to the separation from the mixed layer by depth. Horizontal mixing is constrained by bathymetry and boundaries formed by interactions with sub-tropical gyres and other major current systems. Low oxygen water may spread (by advection) from under areas of high productivity up to these physical boundaries to create a stagnant pool of water with no direct connection to the ocean surface even though (as in the Eastern Tropical North Pacific) there may be relatively little organic matter falling from the surface.

=== Microbes ===
In OMZs oxygen concentration drops to levels <10 nM at the base of the oxycline and can remain anoxic for over 700 m depth. This lack of oxygen can be reinforced or increased due to physical processes changing oxygen supply such as eddy-driven advection, sluggish ventilation, increases in ocean stratification, and increases in ocean temperature which reduces oxygen solubility.

At a microscopic scale the processes causing ocean deoxygenation rely on microbial aerobic respiration. Aerobic respiration is a metabolic process that microorganisms like bacteria or archaea use to obtain energy by degrading organic matter, consuming oxygen, producing CO_{2} and obtaining energy in the form of ATP. In the ocean surface photosynthetic microorganisms called phytoplankton use solar energy and CO_{2} to build organic molecules (organic matter) releasing oxygen in the process. A large fraction of the organic matter from photosynthesis becomes dissolved organic matter (DOM) that is consumed by bacteria during aerobic respiration in sunlit waters. Another fraction of organic matter sinks to the deep ocean forming aggregates called marine snow. These sinking aggregates are consumed via degradation of organic matter and respiration at depth.

At depths in the ocean where no light can reach, aerobic respiration is the dominant process. When the oxygen in a parcel of water is consumed, the oxygen cannot be replaced without the water reaching the surface ocean. When oxygen concentrations drop to below <10 nM, microbial processes that are normally inhibited by oxygen can take place like denitrification and anammox. Both processes extract elemental nitrogen from nitrogen compounds and that elemental nitrogen which does not stay in solution escapes as a gas, resulting in a net loss of nitrogen from the ocean.

=== Bioavailability of oxygen ===
==== Oxygen demand ====
An organism's demand for oxygen is dependent on its metabolic rate. Metabolic rates can be affected by external factors such as the temperature of the water, and internal factors such as the species, life stage, size, and activity level of the organism. The body temperature of ectotherms (such as fishes and invertebrates) fluctuates with the temperature of the water. As the external temperature increases, ectotherm metabolisms increase as well, increasing their demand for oxygen. Different species have different basal metabolic rates and therefore different oxygen demands.

Life stages of organisms also have different metabolic demands. In general, younger stages tend to grow in size and advance in developmental complexity quickly. As the organism reaches maturity, metabolic demands switch from growth and development to maintenance, which requires far fewer resources. Smaller organisms have higher metabolisms per unit of mass, so smaller organisms will require more oxygen per unit mass, while larger organisms generally require more total oxygen. Higher activity levels also require more oxygen.

This is why bioavailability is important in deoxygenated systems: an oxygen quantity which is dangerously low for one species might be more than enough for another species.

==== Indices and calculations ====
Several indices to measure bioavailability have been suggested: Respiration Index, Oxygen Supply Index, and the Metabolic Index. The Respiration Index describes oxygen availability based on the free energy available in the reactants and products of the stoichiometric equation for respiration. However, organisms have ways of altering their oxygen intake and carbon dioxide release, so the strict stoichiometric equation is not necessarily accurate. The Oxygen Supply Index accounts for oxygen solubility and partial pressure, along with the Q_{10} of the organism, but does not account for behavioral or physiological changes in organisms to compensate for reduced oxygen availability. The Metabolic Index accounts for the supply of oxygen in terms of solubility, partial pressure, and diffusivity of oxygen in water, and the organism's metabolic rate. The metabolic index is generally viewed as a closer approximation of oxygen bioavailability than the other indices.

There are two thresholds of oxygen required by organisms:

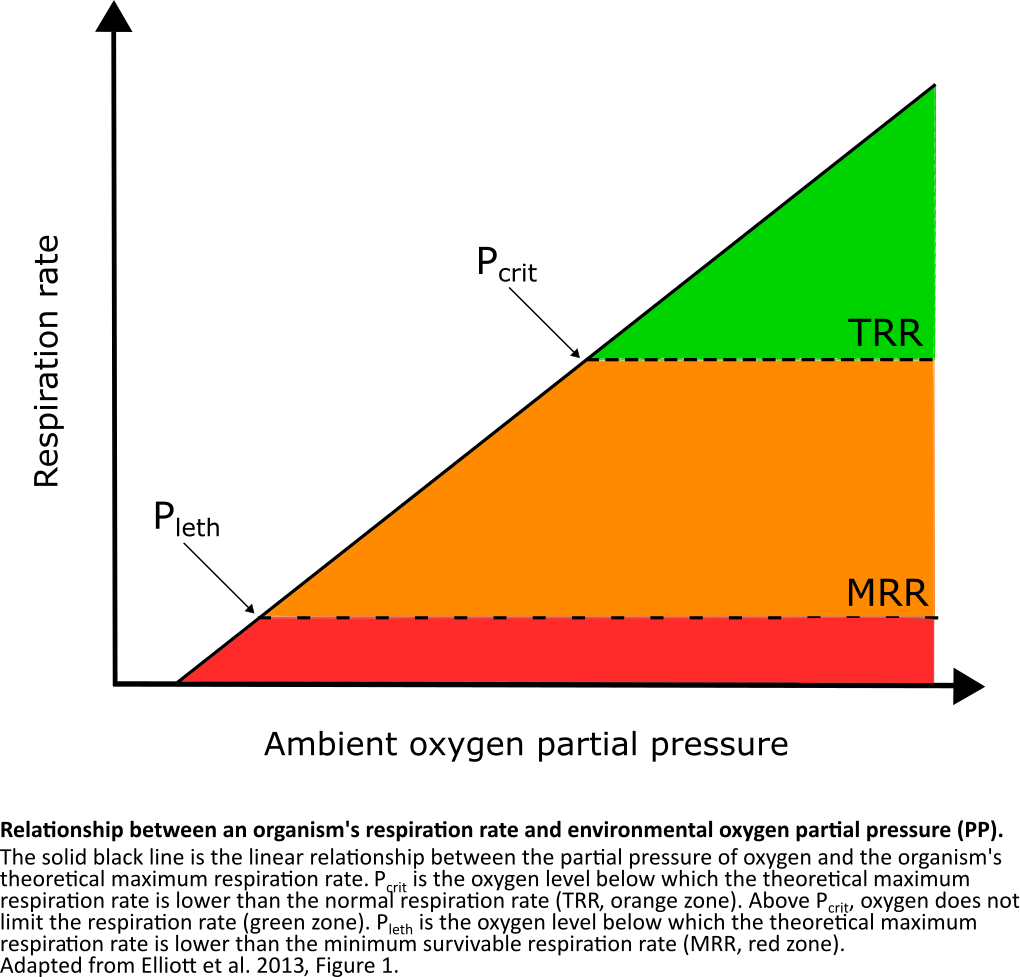
Respiration- Pcrit and Pleth

- P_{crit} (critical partial pressure)- the oxygen level below which an organism cannot support a normal respiration rate
- P_{leth} (lethal partial pressure)- the oxygen level below which an organism cannot support the minimum respiration rate necessary for survival.

Since bioavailability is specific to each organism and temperature, calculation of these thresholds is done experimentally by measuring activity and respiration rates under different temperature and oxygen conditions, or by collecting data from separate studies.

== Life in the OMZ ==
Despite the low oxygen conditions, organisms have evolved to live in and around OMZs. For those organisms, like the vampire squid, special adaptations are needed to either make do with lesser amounts of oxygen or to extract oxygen from the water more efficiently. For example, the giant red mysid (Gnathophausia ingens) continues to live aerobically (using oxygen) in OMZs. They have highly developed gills with large surface area and thin blood-to-water diffusion distance that enables effective removal of oxygen from the water (up to 90% O_{2} removal from inhaled water) and an efficient circulatory system with high capacity and high blood concentration of a protein (hemocyanin) that readily binds oxygen.

Another strategy used by some classes of bacteria in the oxygen minimum zones is to use nitrate rather than oxygen, thus drawing down the concentrations of this important nutrient. This process is called denitrification. The oxygen minimum zones thus play an important role in regulating the productivity and ecological community structure of the global ocean. For example, giant bacterial mats floating in the oxygen minimum zone off the west coast of South America may play a key role in the region's extremely rich fisheries, as bacterial mats the size of Uruguay have been found there.

=== Zooplankton ===
Decreased oxygen availability results in decreases in many zooplankton species' egg production, food intake, respiration, and metabolic rates. Temperature and salinity in areas of decreased oxygen concentrations also affect oxygen availability. Higher temperatures and salinity lower oxygen solubility decrease the partial pressure of oxygen. This decreased partial pressure increases organisms' respiration rates, causing the oxygen demand of the organism to increase.

In addition to affecting their vital functions, zooplankton alter their distribution in response to hypoxic or anoxic zones. Many species actively avoid low oxygen zones, while others take advantage of their predators' low tolerance for hypoxia and use these areas as a refuge. Zooplankton that exhibit daily vertical migrations to avoid predation and low oxygen conditions also excrete ammonium near the oxycline and contribute to increased anaerobic ammonium oxidation (anammox, which produces N_{2} gas. As hypoxic regions expand vertically and horizontally, the habitable ranges for phytoplankton, zooplankton, and nekton increasingly overlap, increasing their susceptibility to predation and human exploitation.

== Changes ==
OMZs have changed over time due to effects from numerous global chemical and biological processes. To assess these changes, scientists utilize climate models and sediment samples to understand changes to dissolved oxygen in OMZs. Many recent studies of OMZs have focused on their fluctuations over time and how they may be currently changing as a result of climate change.

=== In geological time scales ===
Some research has aimed to understand how OMZs have changed over geological time scales. Throughout the history of Earth's oceans, OMZs have fluctuated on long time scales, becoming larger or smaller depending on multiple variables. The factors that change OMZs are the amount of oceanic primary production resulting in increased respiration at greater depths, changes in the oxygen supply due to poor ventilation, and amount of oxygen supplied through thermohaline circulation.

=== Since industrialization ===
While oxygen minimum zones (OMZs) occur naturally, they can be exacerbated by human impacts like climate change and land-based pollution from agriculture and sewage. The prediction of current climate models and climate change scenarios is that substantial warming and loss of oxygen throughout the majority of the upper ocean will occur. Global warming increases ocean temperatures, especially in shallow coastal areas. When the water temperature increases, its ability to hold oxygen decreases, leading to oxygen concentrations going down in the water. This compounds the effects of eutrophication in coastal zones described above.

Open ocean areas with no oxygen have grown more than 1.7 million square miles in the last 50 years, and coastal waters have seen a tenfold increase in low-oxygen areas in the same time.

Measurement of dissolved oxygen in coastal and open ocean waters for the past 50 years has revealed a marked decline in oxygen content. This decline is associated with expanding spatial extent, expanding vertical extent, and prolonged duration of oxygen-poor conditions in all regions of the global oceans. Examinations of the spatial extent of OMZs in the past through paleoceanographical methods clearly shows that the spatial extent of OMZs has expanded through time, and this expansion is coupled to ocean warming and reduced ventilation of thermocline waters.

Research has attempted to model potential changes to OMZs as a result of rising global temperatures and human impact. This is challenging due to the many factors that could contribute to changes in OMZs. The factors used for modeling change in OMZs are numerous, and in some cases hard to measure or quantify. Some of the processes being studied are changes in oxygen gas solubility as a result of rising ocean temperatures, as well as changes in the amount of respiration and photosynthesis occurring around OMZs. Many studies have concluded that OMZs are expanding in multiple locations, but fluctuations of modern OMZs are still not fully understood. Existing Earth system models project considerable reductions in oxygen and other physical-chemical variables in the ocean due to climate change, with potential ramifications for ecosystems and humans.

The global decrease in oceanic oxygen content is statistically significant and emerging beyond the envelope of natural fluctuations. This trend of oxygen loss is accelerating, with widespread and obvious losses occurring after the 1980s. The rate and total content of oxygen loss varies by region, with the North Pacific emerging as a particular hotspot of deoxygenation due to the increased amount of time since its deep waters were last ventilated (see thermohaline circulation) and related high apparent oxygen utilization (AOU). Estimates of total oxygen loss in the global ocean range from 119 to 680 T mol decade^{−1} since the 1950s. These estimates represent 2% of the global ocean oxygen inventory.

Melting of gas hydrates in bottom layers of water may result in the release of more methane from sediments and subsequent consumption of oxygen by aerobic respiration of methane to carbon dioxide. Another effect of climate change on oceans that causes ocean deoxygenation is circulation changes. As the ocean warms from the surface, stratification is expected to increase, which shows a tendency for slowing down ocean circulation, which then increases ocean deoxygenation.

== See also ==
- Dead zone (ecology), localized areas of dramatically reduced oxygen levels, often due to human impacts.
- Ocean deoxygenation
- Anoxic waters
