= Mesopelagic zone =

Part of the pelagic zone

The mesopelagic zone (Greek μέσον, middle), also known as the middle pelagic, dysphotic zone, or twilight zone, is the part of the pelagic zone that lies between the photic epipelagic and the aphotic bathypelagic zones. It is defined by light, and begins at the depth where only 1% of incident light reaches and ends where there is no light; depth ranges from approximately 200 to 1,000 meters (660 to 3,280 ft) below the ocean surface. It is largely nutrient-rich in comparison to the euphotic zone, making the biogeochemical processes of the mesopelagic particularly important to nutrient cycling in the ocean.

The mesopelagic zone occupies about 60% of the planet's surface and about 20% of the ocean's volume, comprising a large portion of the total biosphere. It hosts a diverse biological community that includes bristlemouths, blobfish, bioluminescent jellyfish, giant squid, and myriad other unique organisms adapted to live in a low-light environment. It features prominently in art and literature through depictions of deep-sea creatures.

== Physical conditions ==
Pelagic zones.

The mesopelagic zone includes regions of sharp changes in temperature, salinity and density called the thermocline, halocline, and pycnocline respectively. The temperature variations are large; from over 20 °C (68 °F) at the upper layers to around 4 °C (39 °F) at the boundary with the bathyal zone. The variation in salinity is smaller, typically between 34.5 and 35 psu. The density ranges from 1023 to 1027 g/L of seawater. These changes in temperature, salinity, and density induce stratification which creates ocean layers. These different water masses affect gradients and mixing of nutrients and dissolved gasses. This makes it a dynamic zone.

The mesopelagic zone has some unique acoustic features. The Sound Fixing and Ranging (SOFAR) channel, where sound travels the slowest due to salinity and temperature variations, is located at the base of the mesopelagic zone at about 600–1,200m. It is a wave-guided zone where sound waves refract within the layer and propagate long distances. The channel got its name during World War II when the US Navy proposed using it as a life saving tool. Shipwreck survivors could drop a small explosive timed to explode in the SOFAR channel and then listening stations could determine the position of the life raft. During the 1950s, the US Navy tried to use this zone to detect Soviet submarines by creating an array of hydrophones called the Sound Surveillance System (SOSUS). Oceanographers later used this underwater surveillance system to determine the speed and direction of deep ocean currents by dropping SOFAR floats that could be detected with the SOSUS array.

The mesopelagic zone is important for water mass formation, such as mode water. Mode water is a water mass that is typically defined by its vertically mixed properties. It often forms as deep mixed layers at the depth of the thermocline. The mode water in the mesopelagic has residency times on decadal or century scales. The longer overturning times contrast with the daily and shorter scales that a variety of animals move vertically through the zone and sinking of various debris.

== Biogeochemistry ==
=== Carbon ===
The mesopelagic zone plays a key role in the ocean's biological pump, which contributes to the oceanic carbon cycle. In the biological pump, organic carbon is produced in the surface euphotic zone where light promotes photosynthesis. A fraction of this production is exported out of the surface mixed layer and into the mesopelagic zone. One pathway for carbon export from the euphotic layer is through sinking of particles, which can be accelerated through repackaging of organic matter in zooplankton fecal pellets, ballasted particles, and aggregates.

In the mesopelagic zone, the biological pump is key to carbon cycling, as this zone is largely dominated by remineralization of particulate organic carbon (POC). When a fraction of POC is exported from the euphotic zone, an estimated 90% of that POC is respired in the mesopelagic zone. This is due to the microbial organisms that respire organic matter and remineralize the nutrients, while mesopelagic fish also package organic matter into quick-sinking parcels for deeper export. Organic carbon that is not remineralized is buried into ocean sediments or remain as refractory dissolved organic matter.

Another key process occurring in this zone is the diel vertical migration of certain species, which move between the euphotic zone and mesopelagic zone and actively transport particulate organic matter to the deep. In one study in the Equatorial Pacific, myctophids in the mesopelagic zone were estimated to actively transport 15–28% of the passive POC sinking to the deep, while a study near the Canary Islands estimated 53% of vertical carbon flux was due to active transport from a combination of zooplankton and micronekton. When primary productivity is high, the contribution of active transport by vertical migration has been estimated to be comparable to sinking particle export.

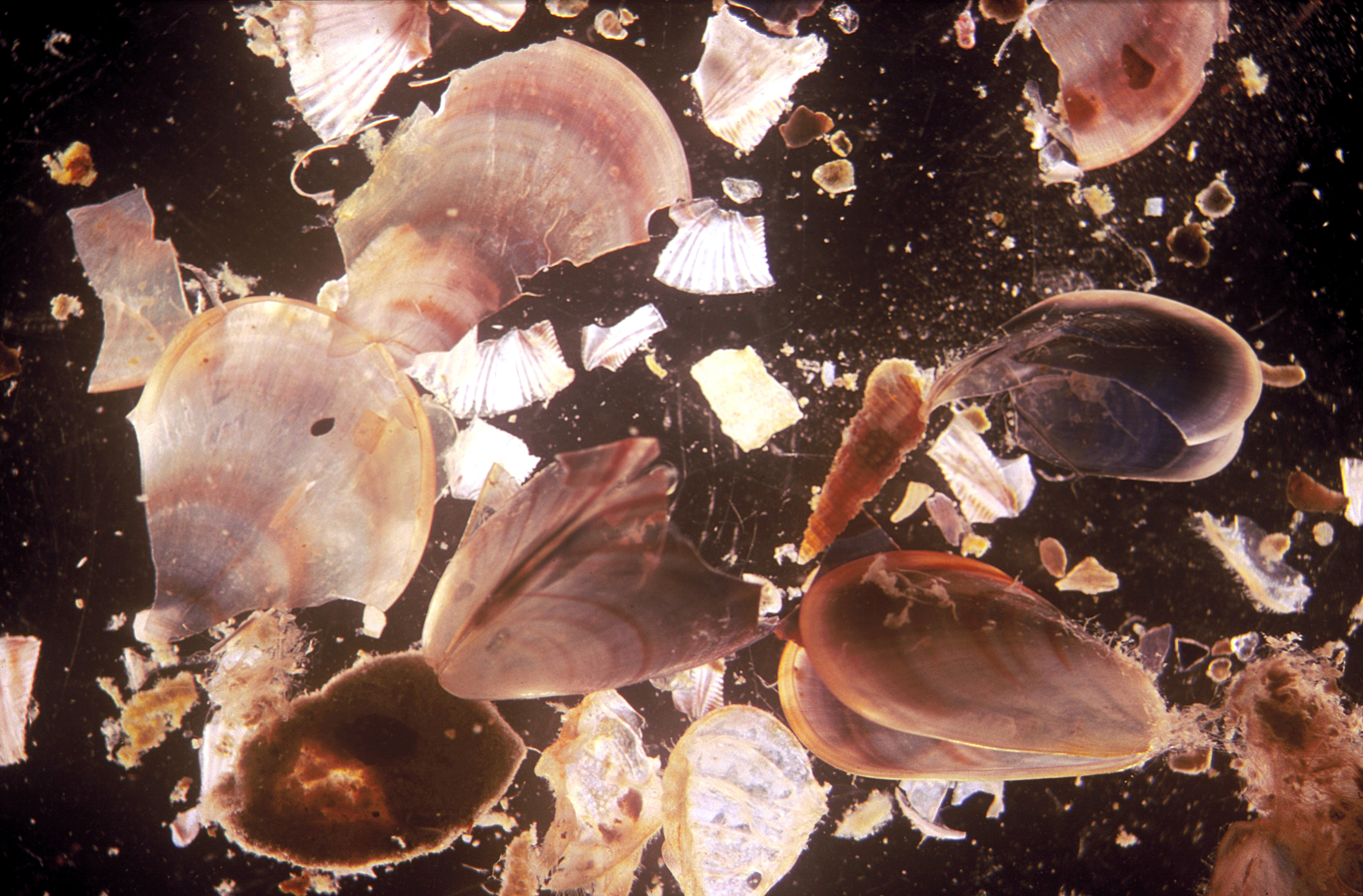
Sediment trap sample, Thermaikos Gulf, Greece, 2000. Stereoscopic image of the collected material above 63-μm pore size net. Calcareous shells and skeletons of planktonic organisms can be identified.

=== Oxygen ===
Dissolved oxygen is a requirement for aerobic respiration, and while the surface ocean is usually oxygen-rich due to atmospheric gas exchange and photosynthesis, the mesopelagic zone is not in direct contact with the atmosphere, due to stratification at the base of the surface mixed layer. Organic matter is exported to the mesopelagic zone from the overlying euphotic layer, while the minimal light in the mesopelagic zone limits photosynthesis. The oxygen consumption due to respiration of most of the sinking organic matter and lack of gas exchange, often creates an oxygen minimum zone (OMZ) in the mesopelagic. The mesopelagic OMZ is particularly severe in the eastern tropical Pacific Ocean and tropical Indian Ocean due to poor ventilation and high rates of organic carbon export to the mesopelagic. Oxygen concentrations in the mesopelagic are occasionally result in suboxic concentrations, making aerobic respiration difficult for organisms. In these anoxic regions, chemosynthesis may occur in which CO_{2} and reduced compounds such as sulfide or ammonia are taken up to form organic carbon, contributing to the organic carbon reservoir in the mesopelagic. This pathway of carbon fixation has been estimated to be comparable in rate to the contribution by heterotrophic production in this ocean realm.

=== Nitrogen ===
Nitrogen is a limiting nutrient in biological systems which influence productivity in marine environments.The mesopelagic zone, an area of significant respiration and remineralization of organic particles, is generally nutrient-rich. This is in contrast to the overlying euphotic zone, which is often nutrient-limited. The difference in nitrogen availability between the epipelagic zone and the mesopelagic zone is attributed to the biogeochemical processes that mediate sinking particulate organic matter.Areas of low oxygen such as OMZ's are a key area of denitrification by prokaryotes, a heterotrophic pathways in which nitrate is converted into nitrogen gas, resulting in a loss to the ocean reservoir of reactive nitrogen. At the suboxic interface that occurs at the edge of the OMZ, nitrite and ammonium can be coupled to produce nitrogen gas through anammox, also removing nitrogen from the biologically available pool. Nitrogen availability is also dependent on the region of the globe. The limitation of nitrogen as a nutrient is typically found in subtropical gyres and is often co-limited with iron. A flux of nitrogen-rich particulate organic matter in deeper parts of the ocean is created from the microbial diagenesis of organic matter that begins in the epipelagic zone. Evidence for increased nitrogen content in the epipelagic zone is seen in an increase of amino-acids found in dissolved organic matter.

=== Phosphorus ===
Phosphorus is a vital component of nutrient cycling in the mesopelagic. Phytoplankton in the euphotic zone use available phosphate for growth and deposit dissolved organic phosphate (DOP) and particulate organic phosphate (POP) through fecal secretion or dead material. Once DOP/POP makes it to the mesopelagic, bacteria remineralize these phosphates in order to acquire nutrients, releasing dissolved inorganic phosphate (DIP) back into the water column. DIP is then brought back to the surface waters through vertical mixing and diel vertical migration, which replenishes euphotic phosphates. Phosphatase is an important enzyme in the process of converting DOP/POP into DIP, and is 37 times more active in the mesopelagic zone (800 meters) than at the surface. During the remineralization process, a proportion of the phosphate becomes sequestered in oceanic sediments along with oxygen (in aerobic conditions), and remains largely inert. This phosphate sediment can, however, release nutrients back into the water column under anoxic conditions.

=== Sulfur ===
Similar to phosphorus, sulfur also participates in a cycle of renewal with surface waters. Organic sulfate sinks to the mesopelagic, then becomes remineralized into inorganic sulfate, which enters the euphotic layer once again. This cycle, however, is only one component of a larger process in sulfur cycling, known as cryptic sulfur cycling. Cryptic sulfur cycling occurs in OMZs, and is characterized by the tight coupling of sulfate reduction and subsequent oxidation. Much of this sulfur is supplied to the deep ocean by hydrothermal venting, which releases sulfide into the surrounding water. Additionally, sulfide generated in the mesopelagic contributes to the creation of pyrite, which is formed by its combination with iron II, typically in anoxic environments.

=== Organic Matter ===
==== Cycling ====
A driver of the ocean biological pump is the sinking, decomposition, and cycling of dissolved and particulate organic matter that creates a flux of nutrients. Organic matter consists of fixed carbon, oxygen, and nitrogen originating from plant, animal, and microbe biomass. The molecular composition of particulate and dissolved matter in the mesopelagic zone is heavily dependent on the biogeochemical environment (element limitation, microbiome, abiotic elements) in the euphotic zone. The main limitation to sinking organic matter found in the mesopelagic zone is because of the variability of nitrogen across the globe. In other words, the molecular composition of organic matter that enters the mesopelagic zone varies spatially but is not dependent on the depth of the ocean. However, as the ocean becomes deeper, the flux of organic matter loses intensity or magnitude. This reduction of flux, or attenuation, of organic matter is estimated to be about 70-85% lower. Oxygen in the epipelagic zone is consumed through the removal of dissolved organic matter as well as the remineralization of nitrogen.

==== Sinking ====
Mean particle sinking rates are 10 to 100 m/day. Sinking rates have been measured in the project VERTIGO (Vertical Transport in the Global Ocean) using settling velocity sediment traps. The variability in sinking rates is due to differences in ballast, water temperature, food web structure and the types of phyto and zooplankton in different areas of the ocean. If the material sinks faster, then it gets respired less by bacteria, transporting more carbon from the surface layer to the deep ocean. Larger fecal pellets sink faster due to lower friction-surface/mass ratio. More viscous waters could slow the sinking rate of particles. The binding to fecal pellets also creates a physical barrier for microbes slowing the consumption of particulate organic matter. The decreased consumption of particulate matter suggests that dissolved organic matter is removed quicker by microbes than particulate matter is removed. It is also important to note that microbial digestion and respiration adapts as depth of the ocean increases which affects spatial molecular compositions.The microbial activity in the ocean also explains the organic matter flux attenuation caused by remineralization or packaging of sinking particles.

== Biology ==
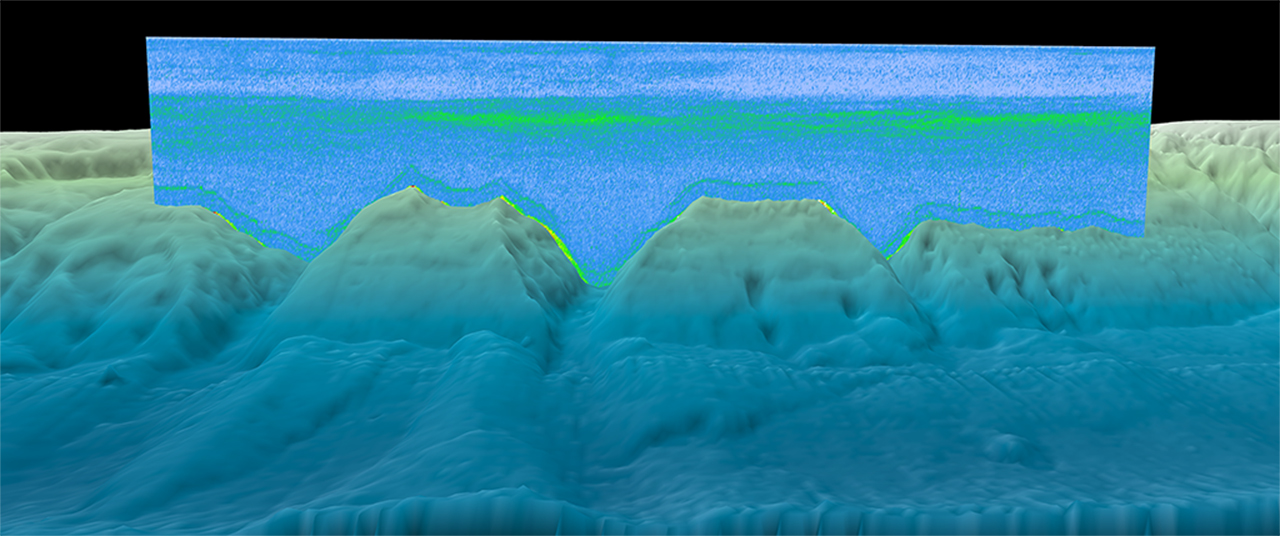
Sonar data. The green layer in the water column is the deep scattering layer of diel vertically migrating mesopelagic zooplankton and fish.

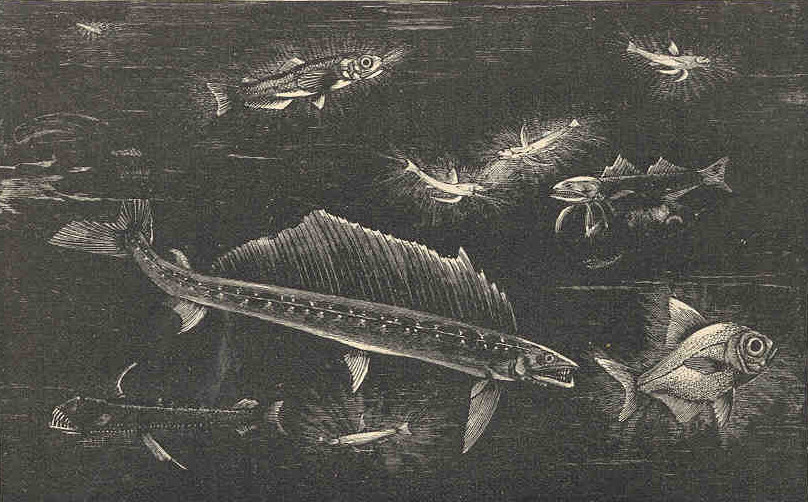
Illustration by Charles Frederick Holder of various bioluminescent fish that live in the mesopelagic zone.

Although some light penetrates the mesopelagic zone, it is insufficient for photosynthesis. The biological community of the mesopelagic zone has adapted to a low-light environment. This is a very efficient ecosystem with many organisms recycling the organic matter sinking from the epipelagic zone resulting in very little organic carbon making it to deeper ocean waters. The general types of life forms found are daytime-visiting herbivores, detritivores feeding on dead organisms and fecal pellets, and carnivores feeding on those detritivores.

Many organisms in the mesopelagic zone move into the epipelagic zone at night, and retreat to the mesopelagic zone during the day, known as diel vertical migration. These migrators can avoid visual predators during the day and feed at night, while some of their predators also migrate up at night to follow the prey.

SONAR operators in World War II would regularly misinterpret the signal returned by thick layers of mesopelagic plankton as a false sea floor.

Estimates of the global biomass of mesopelagic fishes range from 1 gigatonne (Gt) based on net tows to 7–10 Gt based on measurements using active acoustics.

=== Virus and microbial ecology ===
Little is known about the microbial community of the mesopelagic zone as a result of the difficulty involved in studying this region of the ocean. Studies using DNA from seawater samples emphasized the importance of viruses and microbes in recycling organic matter from the surface ocean, known as the microbial loop. These microbes can get their energy from different metabolic pathways. Some are autotrophs, heterotrophs, and a 2006 study discovered chemoautotrophs. This chemoautotrophic Archaea crenarchaeon Candidatus can oxidize ammonium as their energy source without oxygen, which potentially significantly impacts the nitrogen and carbon cycles. One study estimates these ammonium-oxidizing bacteria, which are only 5% of the microbial population, can annually capture 1.1 Gt of organic carbon.

Microbial biomass and diversity typically decline exponentially with depth in the mesopelagic zone, tracking the general decline of food from above. The community composition varies with depths in the mesopelagic as different organisms are evolved for varying light conditions. Microbial biomass in the mesopelagic is greater at higher latitudes and decreases towards the tropics, which is likely linked to the differing productivity levels in the surface waters. Viruses however are abundant in the mesopelagic, with around 10^{10} - 10^{12} every cubic meter, which is fairly uniform throughout the mesopelagic zone.

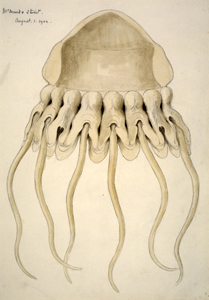
Helmet jellyfish, Periphylla periphylla.

=== Zooplankton ecology ===
The mesopelagic zone hosts a diverse zooplankton community. Common zooplankton include copepods, krill, jellyfish, siphonophores, larvaceans, cephalopods, and pteropods. Food is generally scarce in the mesopelagic, so predators have to be efficient in capturing food. Gelatinous organisms are thought to play an important role in the ecology of the mesopelagic and are common predators. Though previously thought to be passive predators drifting through the water column, jellyfish may potentially be more active predators. One study found that helmet jellyfish, Periphylla periphylla, exhibit social behavior and can find each other at depth and form groups. Such behavior was previously attributed to mating, but scientists speculate this could be a feeding strategy to allow a group of jellyfish to hunt together.

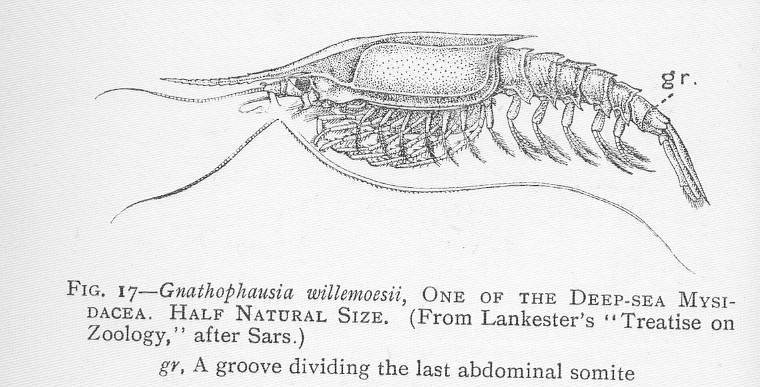
Deep sea mysid, Gnathophausia spp.

Mesopelagic zooplankton have unique adaptations for the low light. Bioluminescence is a common strategy in many zooplankton. This light production is thought to function as a form of communication between conspecifics, prey attraction, prey deterrence, and/or reproduction strategy. Another common adaption is enhanced light organs, or eyes, which is common in krill and shrimp, so they can take advantage of the limited light. Some octopus and krill have tubular eyes that look upwards in the water column.

Most life processes, like growth and reproductive rates, are slower in the mesopelagic. Metabolic activity has been shown to decrease with increasing depth and decreasing temperature in colder-water environments. For example, the mesopelagic shrimp-like mysid, Gnathophausia ingens, lives for 6.4 to 8 years, while similar benthic shrimp only live for 2 years.

=== Fish ecology ===
The mesopelagic is home to a significant portion of the world's total fish biomass. Mesopelagic fish are found globally, with exceptions in the Arctic Ocean. A 1980 study puts the mesopelagic fish biomass at about one billion tons. Later, a 2008 study estimated the world marine fish biomass at between 0.8 and 2 billion tons. A more recent study concluded mesopelagic fish could have a biomass amounting to 10 billion tons, equivalent to about 100 times the annual catch of traditional fisheries of about 100 million metric tons. However, there is a lot of uncertainty in this biomass estimate. This ocean realm could contain the largest fishery in the world and there is active development for this zone to become a commercial fishery.

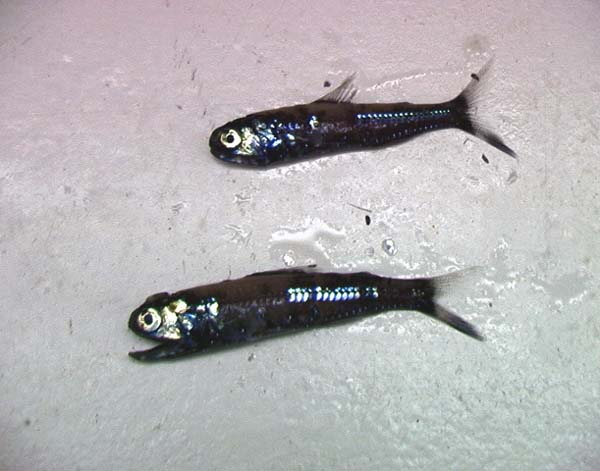
Myctophids (lanternfish).

There are currently thirty families of known mesopelagic fish. One dominant fish in the mesopelagic zone are lanternfish (Myctophidae), which include 245 species distributed among 33 different genera. They have prominent photophores along their ventral side. The Gonostomatidae, or bristlemouth, are also common mesopelagic fish. The bristlemouth could be the Earth's most abundant vertebrate, with numbers in the hundreds of trillions to quadrillions.

Mesopelagic fish are difficult to study due to their unique anatomy. Many of these fish have swim bladders to help them control their buoyancy, which makes them hard to sample because those gas-filled chambers typically burst as the fish come up in nets and the fish die. Scientists in California have made progress on mesopelagic fish sampling by developing a submersible chamber that can keep fish alive on the way up to the surface under a controlled atmosphere and pressure. A passive method to estimate mesopelagic fish abundance is by echosounding to locate the 'deep scattering layer' through the backscatter received from these acoustic sounders. A 2015 study suggested that some areas have had a decline in abundance of mesopelagic fish, including off the coast of Southern California, using a long-term study dating back to the 1970s. Cold water species are especially vulnerable to decline.

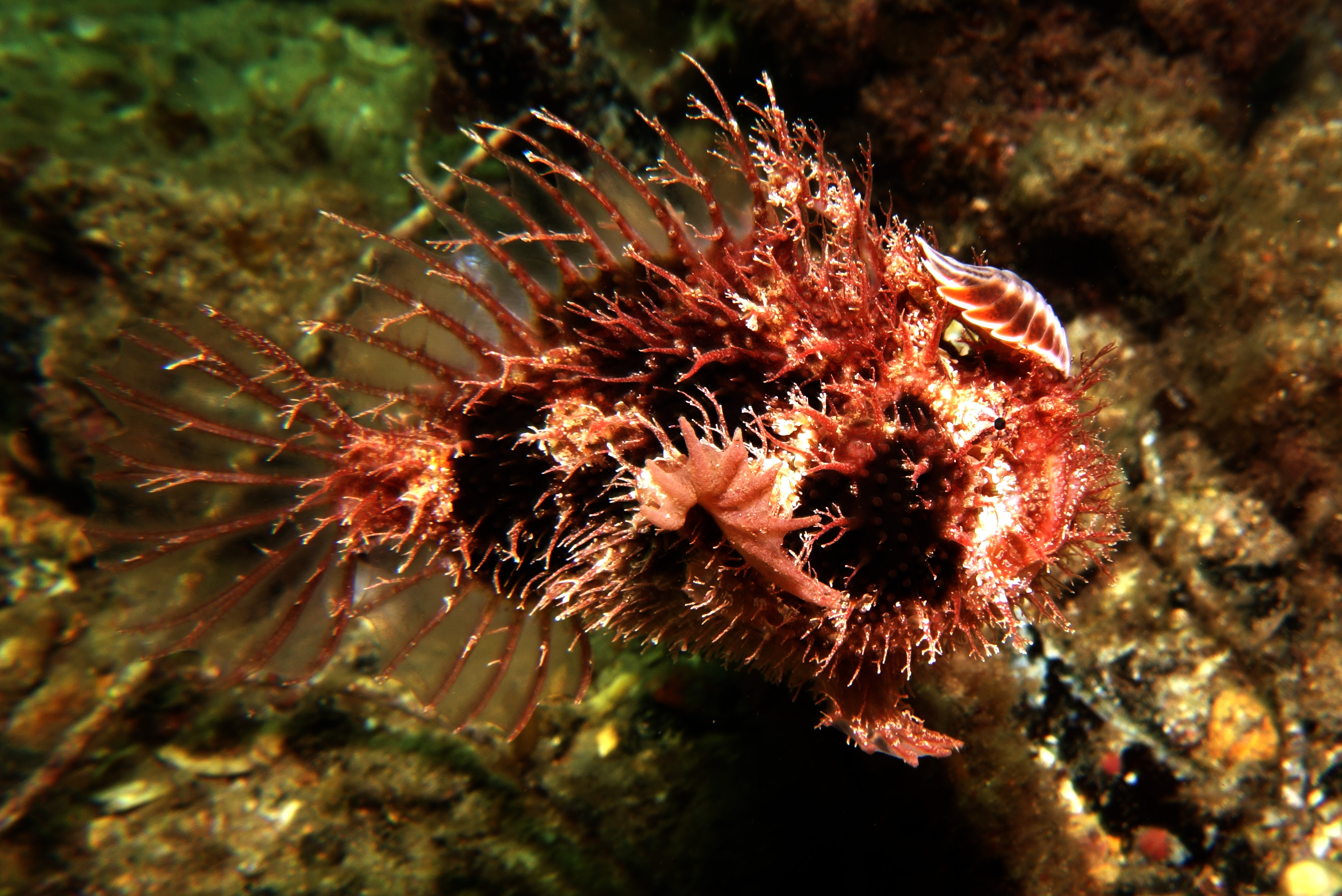
Tasselled anglerfish (Rhycherus filamentosus).

Mesopelagic fish are adapted to a low-light environment. Many fish are black or red, because these colors appear dark due to the limited light penetration at depth. Some fish have rows of photophores, small light-producing organs, on their underside to mimic the surrounding environment. Other fish have mirrored bodies which are angled to reflect the surrounding ocean low-light colors and protect the fish from being seen, while another adaptation is countershading where fish have light colors on the ventral side and dark colors on the dorsal side.

Food is often limited and patchy in the mesopelagic, leading to dietary adaptations. Common adaptations fish may have include sensitive eyes and large jaws for enhanced and opportunistic feeding. Fish are also generally small to reduce the energy requirement for growth and muscle formation. Other feeding adaptations include jaws that can unhinge, elastic throats, and massive, long teeth. Some predators develop bioluminescent lures, like the tasselled anglerfish, which can attract prey, while others respond to pressure or chemical cues instead of relying on vision.

=== Mammalian Ecology ===
The mesopelagic zone is a key hunting ground for several oceanic mammals, particularly sperm whales. Other notable mammals include beaked whales, elephant seals, Risso's dolphins, fin whales, and humpback whales. Mesopelagic cetaceans range across nearly all oceans, with the sperm whale alone ranging from Alaskan to Antarctic waters. No estimate currently exists for mammalian biomass in the mesopelagic due to the difficulty involved in distinguishing large fish from cetaceans when using acoustic sampling.

The most prevalent mammalian species to inhabit the mesopelagic is likely the sperm whale, which is estimated to consume as many cephalopods as all human fisheries globally each year. Sperm whales are capable of diving to the bottom of the mesopelagic and deeper, spending anywhere from five minutes to almost an hour hunting in this range. In addition to sperm whales, other whales, such as the common rorqual, are known to target mesopelagic nekton as a main source of food. Some species of whale, such as the beaked whale, also exhibit diel behavior, similar to many mesopelagic fish species.

== Human impacts ==
=== Pollution ===
==== Marine debris ====
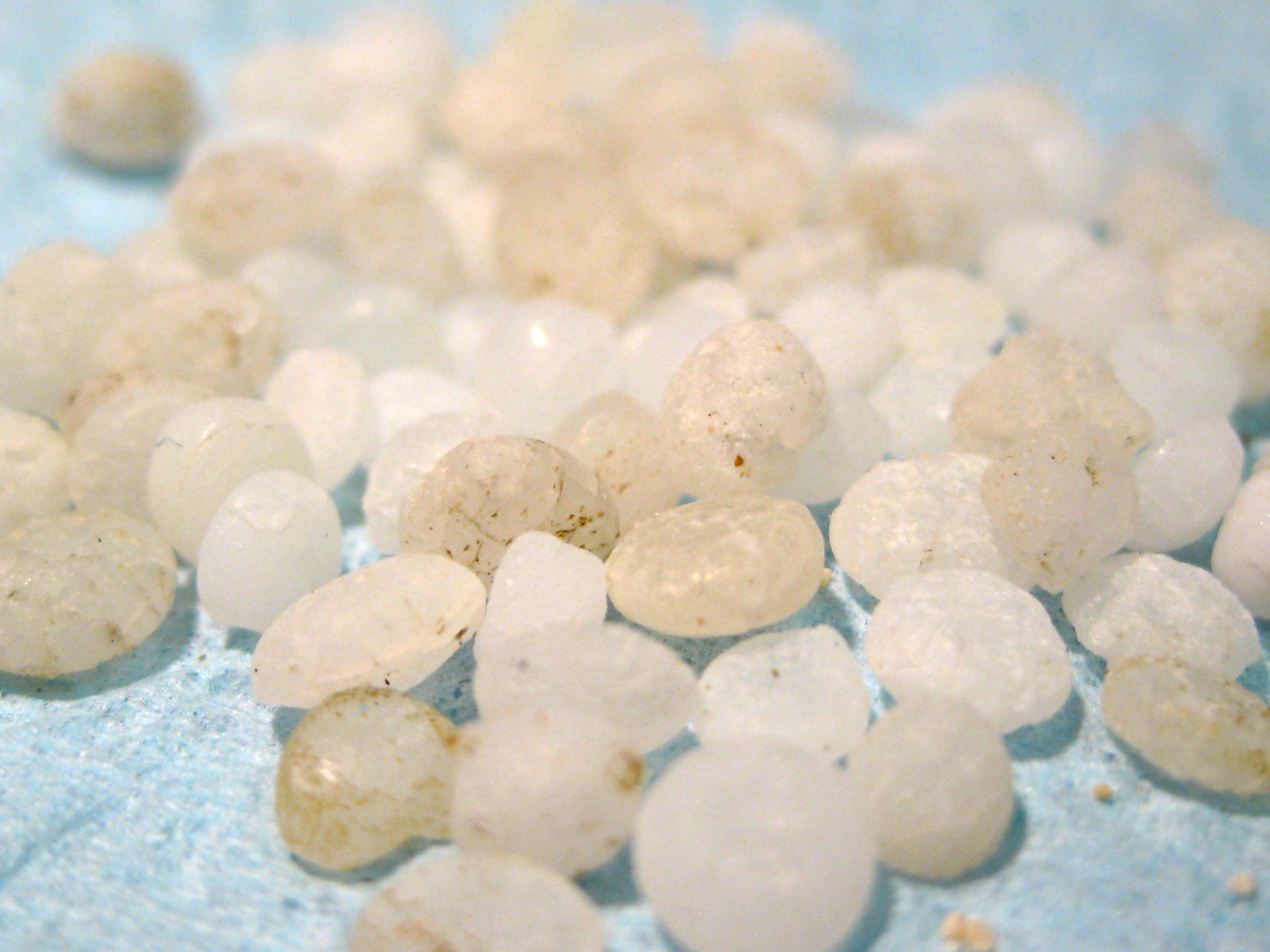
Plastic pellets are a common form of marine debris.

Marine debris, specifically in the plastic form, have been found in every ocean basin and have a wide range of impacts on the marine world.

One of the most critical issues is ingestion of plastic debris, specifically microplastics. Many mesopelagic fish species migrate to the surface waters to feast on their main prey species, zooplankton and phytoplankton, which are mixed with microplastics in the surface waters. Additionally, research has shown that even zooplankton are consuming the microplastics themselves. Mesopelagic fish play a key role in energy dynamics, meaning they provide food to a number of predators including birds, larger fish and marine mammals. The concentration of these plastics has the potential to increase, so more economically important species could become contaminated as well. Concentration of plastic debris in mesopelagic populations can vary depending on geographic location and the concentration of marine debris located there. In 2018, approximately 73% of approximately 200 fish sampled in the North Atlantic had consumed plastic.

==== Bioaccumulation ====
Bioaccumulation (a buildup of a certain substance in the adipose tissue) and biomagnification (the process in which the concentration of the substance grows higher as you rise through the food chain) are growing issues in the mesopelagic zone. Mercury in fish can be traced back to a combination of anthropological factors (such as coal mining) in addition to natural factors. Mercury is a particularly important bioaccumulation contaminant because its concentration in the mesopelagic zone is increasing faster than in surface waters. Inorganic mercury occurs in anthropogenic atmospheric emissions in its gaseous elemental form, which then oxidizes and can be deposited in the ocean. Once there, the oxidized form can be converted to methylmercury, which is its organic form. Research suggests that current levels anthropogenic emissions will not equilibrate between the atmosphere and ocean for a period of decades to centuries, which means we can expect current mercury concentrations in the ocean to keep rising. Mercury is a potent neurotoxin, and poses health risks to the whole food web, beyond the mesopelagic species that consume it. Many of the mesopelagic species, such as myctophids, that make their diel vertical migration to the surface waters, can transfer the neurotoxin when they are consumed by pelagic fish, birds and mammals.

=== Fishing ===
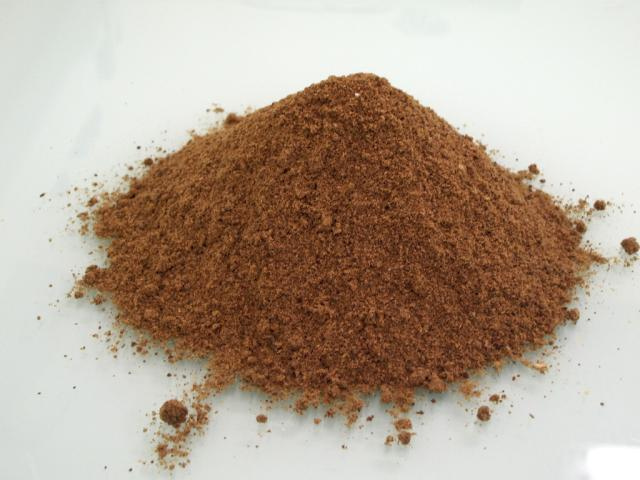
Fishmeal powder

Historically, there have been few examples of efforts to commercialize the mesopelagic zone due to low economic value, technical feasibility and environmental impacts. While the biomass may be abundant, fish species at depth are generally smaller in size and slower to reproduce. Fishing with large trawl nets poses threats to a high percentage of bycatch as well as potential impacts to the carbon cycling processes. Additionally, ships trying to reach productive mesopelagic regions requires fairly long journeys offshore. In 1977, a Soviet fishery opened but closed less than 20 years later due to low commercial profits, while a South African purse seine fishery closed in the mid-1980s due to processing difficulties from the high oil content of fish.

As the biomass in the mesopelagic is so abundant, there has been an increased interest to determine whether these populations could be of economic use in sectors other than direct human consumption. For example, it has been suggested that the high abundance of fish in this zone could potentially satisfy a demand for fishmeal and nutraceuticals. With a growing global population, the demand for fishmeal in support of a growing aquaculture industry is high. There is potential for an economically viable harvest. For example, 5 billion tons of mesopelagic biomass could result in the production of circa 1.25 billion tons of food for human consumption. Additionally, the demand for nutraceuticals is also rapidly growing, stemming from the popular human consumption of Omega-3 fatty acids in addition to the aquaculture industry that requires a specific marine oil for feed material. Lanternfish are of much interest to the aquaculture market, as they are especially high in fatty acids.

=== Climate Change ===
The mesopelagic region plays an important role in the global carbon cycle, as it is the area where most of the surface organic matter is respired. Mesopelagic species also acquire carbon during their diel vertical migration to feed in surface waters, and they transport that carbon to the deep sea when they die. It is estimated that the mesopelagic cycles between 5 and 12 billion tons of carbon dioxide from the atmosphere per year, and until recently, this estimate was not included in many climate models. It is difficult to quantify the effects of climate change on the mesopelagic zone as a whole, as climate change does not have uniform impacts geographically. Research suggests that in warming waters, as long as there are adequate nutrients and food for fish, then mesopelagic biomass could actually increase due to higher trophic efficiency and increased temperature-driven metabolism. However, because ocean warming will not be uniform throughout the global mesopelagic zone, it is predicted that some areas may actually decrease in fish biomass, while others increase.

Water column stratification will also likely increase with ocean warming and climate change. Increased ocean stratification reduces the introduction of nutrients from the deep ocean into the euphotic zone resulting in decreases in both net primary production and sinking particulate matter. Additional research suggests shifts in the geographical range of many species could also occur with warming, with many of them shifting poleward. The combination of these factors could potentially mean that as global ocean basins continue to warm, there could be areas in the mesopelagic that increase in biodiversity and species richness, while declines in other areas, especially moving farther from the equator.

== Research and Exploration ==
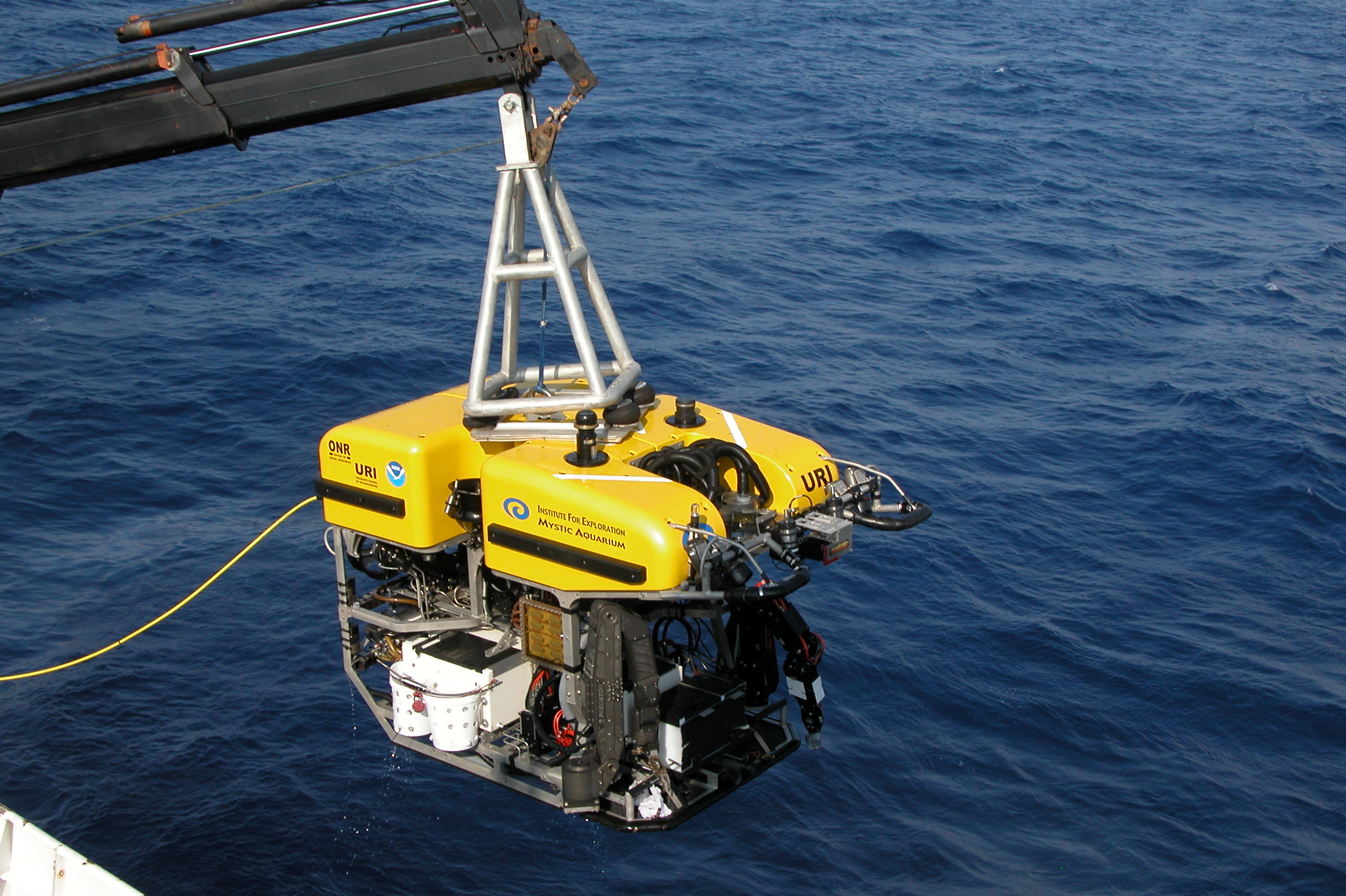
The science ROV 'Hercules' (IFE/URI/NOAA) during a launch in 2005. Note the array of sampling devices and robotic arms that are used to conduct deep-sea research.

There is a dearth of knowledge about the mesopelagic zone so researchers have begun to develop new technology to explore and sample this area. The Woods Hole Oceanographic Institution (WHOI), NASA, and the Norwegian Institute of Marine Research are all working on projects to gain a better understanding of this zone in the ocean and its influence on the global carbon cycle. Traditional sampling methods like nets have proved to be inadequate because they scare off creatures due to the pressure wave formed by the towed net and the light produced by the bioluminescent species caught in the net. Mesopelagic activity was first investigated by use of sonar because the return bounces off of plankton and fish in the water. However, there are many challenges with acoustic survey methods and previous research has estimated errors in measured amounts of biomass of up to three orders of magnitude. This is due to inaccurate incorporation of depth, species size distribution, and acoustic properties of the species. Norway's Institute of Marine Research has launched a research vessel named Dr. Fridtjof Nansen to investigate mesopelagic activity using sonar with their focus being on the sustainability of fishing operations. To overcome the challenges faced with acoustic sampling, WHOI is developing remote operated vehicles (ROVs) and robots (Deep-See, Mesobot, and Snowclops) that are capable of studying this zone more precisely in a dedicated effort called the Ocean Twilight Zone project that launched in August 2018.

=== Discovery and Detection ===
The deep scattering layer often characterizes the mesopelagic due to the high amount of biomass that exists in the region. Acoustic sound sent into the ocean bounces off particles and organisms in the water column and return a strong signal. The region was initially discovered by American researchers during World War II in 1942 during anti-submarine research with sonar. Sonar at the time could not penetrate below this depth due to the large number of creatures obstructing sound waves. It is uncommon to detect deep scattering layers below 1000m. Until recently, sonar has been the predominant method for studying the mesopelagic.

The Malaspina Circumnavigation Expedition was a Spanish-led scientific quest in 2011 to gain a better understanding of the state of the ocean and the diversity in the deep oceans. The data collected, particularly through sonar observations showed that the biomass estimation in the mesopelagic was lower than previously thought.

=== Deep-See ===
WHOI is currently working on a project to characterize and document the pelagic ecosystem. They have developed a device named Deep-See weighing approximately 700 kg, which is designed to be towed behind a research vessel. The Deep-See is capable of reaching depths up to 2000 m and can estimate the amount of biomass and biodiversity in this mesopelagic ecosystem. Deep-See is equipped with cameras, sonars, sensors, water sample collection devices, and a real-time data transmission system.

=== Mesobot ===
WHOI is collaborating with the Monterey Bay Aquarium Research Institute (MBARI), Stanford University, and the University of Texas Rio Grande Valley to develop a small autonomous robot, Mesobot, weighing approximately 75 kg. Mesobot is equipped with high-definition cameras to track and record mesopelagic species on their daily migration over extended periods of time. The robot's thrusters were designed so that they do not disturb the life in the mesopelagic that it is observing. Traditional sample collection devices fail to preserve organisms captured in the mesopelagic due to the large pressure change associated with surfacing. The Mesobot also has a unique sampling mechanism that is capable of keeping the organisms alive during their ascent. The first sea trial of this device is expected to be in 2019.

=== MINIONS ===
Another mesopelagic robot developed by WHOI are the MINIONS. This device descends down the water column and takes images of the amount and size distribution of marine snow at various depths. These tiny particles are a food source for other organisms so it is important to monitor the different levels of marine snow to characterize the carbon cycling processes between the surface ocean and the mesopelagic.

=== SPLAT cam ===
The Harbor Branch Oceanographic Institute has developed the Spatial PLankton Analysis Technique (SPLAT) to identify and map distribution patterns of bioluminescent plankton. The various bioluminescent species produce a unique flash that allows the SPLAT to distinguish each specie's flash characteristic and then map their 3-dimensional distribution patterns. Its intended use was not for investigating the mesopelagic zone, although it is capable of tracking movement patterns of bioluminescent species during their vertical migrations. It would be interesting to apply this mapping technique in the mesopelagic to obtain more information about the diurnal vertical migrations that occur in this zone of the ocean.

== See also ==
- Ocean Twilight Zone project at Woods Hole Oceanographic Institution
- Ocean Twilight Zone creature features
- Value of the ocean twilight zone to humans
- Climate and the ocean twilight zone
- Mesopelagic fish
