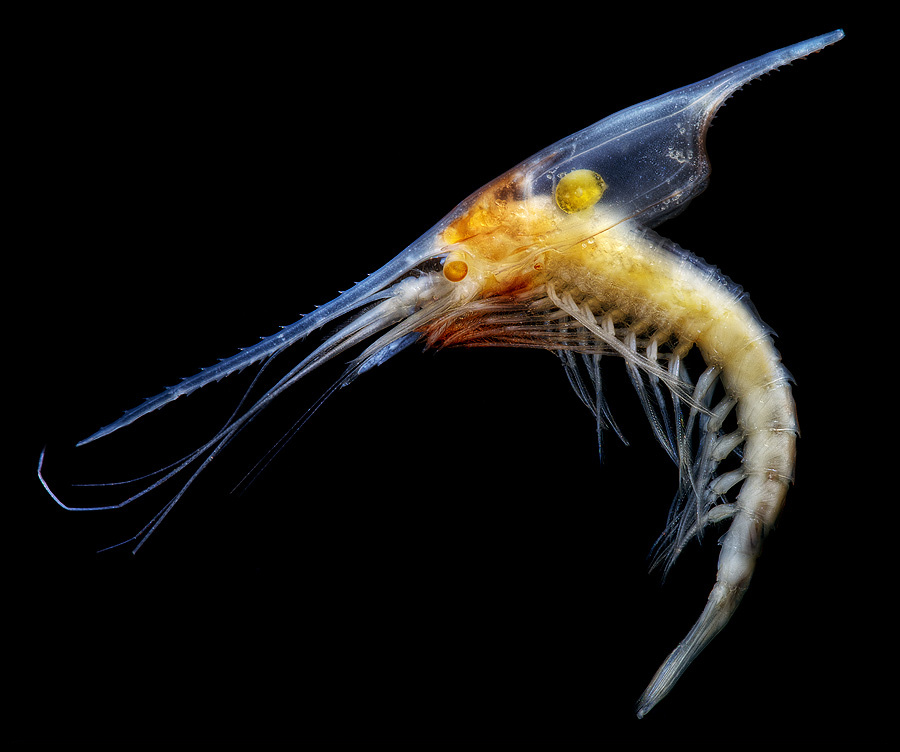
- Gnathophausia zoea (Gnathophausiidae)

Scientific classification
- Kingdom: Animalia
- Phylum: Arthropoda
- Clade: Pancrustacea
- Class: Malacostraca
- Superorder: Peracarida
- Order: Lophogastrida; G. O. Sars, 1870

Families
- Eucopiidae; Gnathophausiidae; Lophogastridae; Peachocarididae

= Lophogastrida =

Order of crustaceans

Lophogastrida is an order of malacostracan crustaceans in the superorder Peracarida, comprising shrimp-like animals that mostly inhabit the relatively deep pelagic waters of the oceans throughout the world.

Most lophogastridan species are 1–8 centimetres (0.4–3.1 in) long, but Gnathophausia ingens can be up to 35 cm (14 in), probably the largest pelagic crustacean in the world. Some 56 extant species in total are currently known. They are classified into three families and nine genera.

The external features of lophogastrids include stalked compound eyes, a carapace that covers the head and thorax, and a muscular cylindrical abdomen. The carapace often extends beyond their heads to form an elongated rostrum. As with other peracarids, lophogastrids are distinct from Caridean shrimp in that they carry their developing embryos and young in a brood pouch, or marsupium, and thus lack a separate planktonic larval stage.

Previously, Lophogastrida was classified as a suborder of a broader peracaridan order, Mysidacea, together with Mysida and Stygiomysida, but that taxon has been generally abandoned. Features distinguishing lophogastrids from the mysids include the absence of statocysts in their uropods, and the presence of well-developed biramous pleopods on their abdomens. Their molecular characters also differ.
