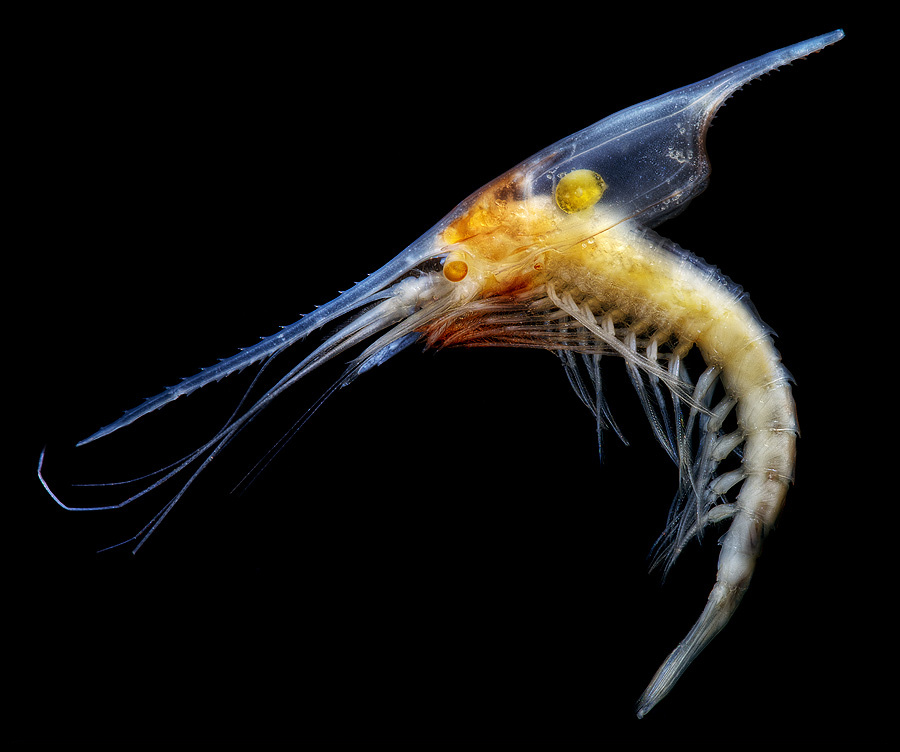
- Adult G. zoea

Scientific classification
- Kingdom: Animalia
- Phylum: Arthropoda
- Class: Malacostraca
- Order: Lophogastrida
- Family: Gnathophausiidae
- Genus: Gnathophausia
- Species: G. zoea

Binomial name
- Gnathophausia zoea Willemoes-Suhm, 1875

Synonyms
- Gnathophausia willemoesi G. O. Sars 1885; Gnathophausia sarsi Wood-Mason, 1891; Gnathophausia cristata Illig, 1906

= Gnathophausia zoea =

Species of crustacean

Gnathophausia zoea is a species of lophogastrid crustacean. It is widely distributed in the Atlantic Ocean from the Arctic Circle to the Equator; in the Pacific Ocean, it is more restricted to tropical areas. The adults may reach 40–50 millimetres (1.6–2.0 in) long, excluding the rostrum, or around 70 mm (2.8 in) including the rostrum.

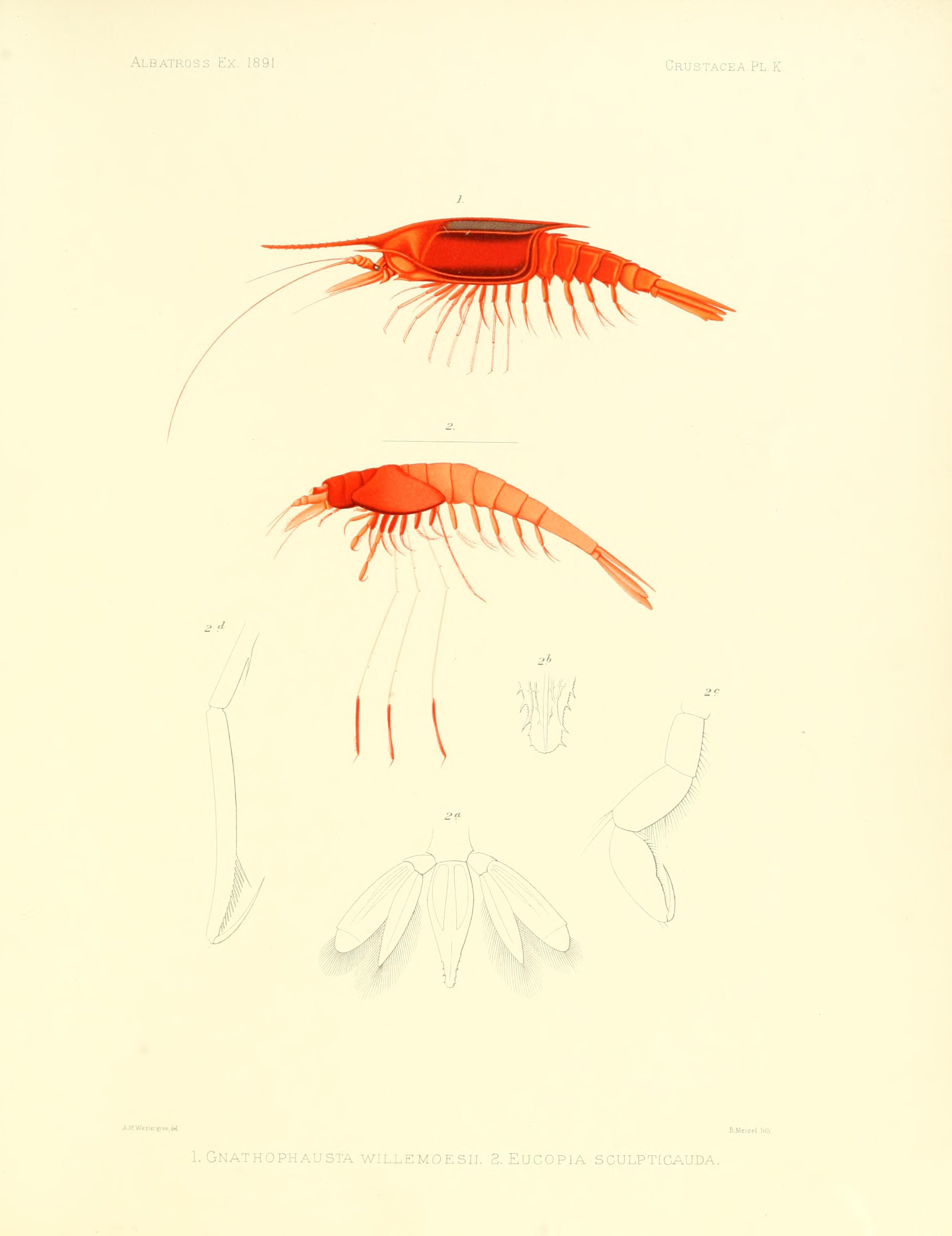
Illustration G. willemoesi now known as G. zoea.

This species has also been known as: Gnathophausia cristata Illig, 1906 (synonym); Gnathophausia sarsii Wood-Mason & Alcock, 1891 (synonym) and Gnathophausia willemoesii G.O. Sars, 1883 (synonym).
