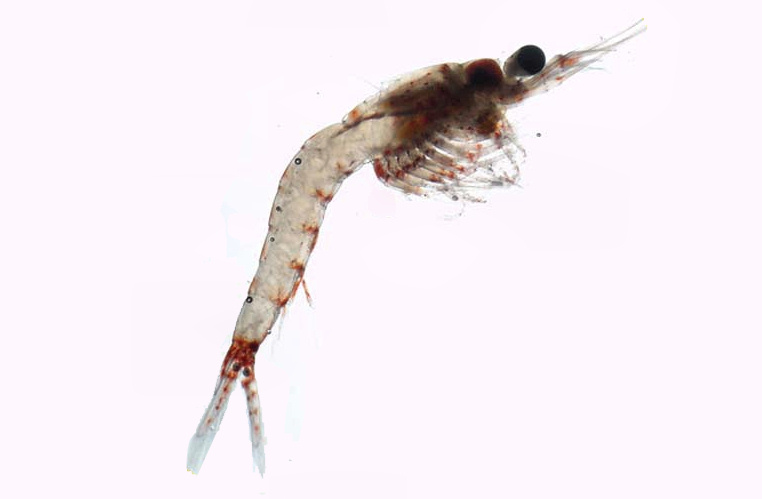
- Hemimysis anomala (Mysida)

Scientific classification
- Kingdom: Animalia
- Phylum: Arthropoda
- Clade: Pancrustacea
- Class: Malacostraca
- Superorder: Peracarida
- Order: Mysidacea; A. H. Haworth, 1825

Orders
- Lophogastrida; Mysida; Pygocephalomorpha

= Mysidacea =

Group of crustaceans

The Mysidacea is a group of shrimp-like crustaceans in the superorder Peracarida, comprising the two extant orders Mysida and Lophogastrida and the prehistoric Pygocephalomorpha. Current data indicate that despite their external similarities, the three orders are not closely related, and the taxon Mysidacea is not used in modern taxonomy.
