= Stomias brevibarbatus =

Conservation status
- Least Concern (IUCN 3.1)

Scientific classification
- Domain: Eukaryota
- Kingdom: Animalia
- Phylum: Chordata
- Class: Actinopterygii
- Order: Stomiiformes
- Family: Stomiidae
- Genus: Stomias
- Species: S. brevibarbatus

Binomial name
- Stomias brevibarbatus Ege, 1918

Species of fish

Stomias brevibarbatus is a species of deep-sea mesopelagic fish in the genus Stomias. The species has been observed in the Atlantic Ocean off the coast of Portugal, and fully-grown adults can reach a maximum length of ~20.4 centimeters.
