= Stomias atriventer =

Conservation status
- Least Concern (IUCN 3.1)

Scientific classification
- Kingdom: Animalia
- Phylum: Chordata
- Class: Actinopterygii
- Order: Stomiiformes
- Family: Stomiidae
- Genus: Stomias
- Species: S. atriventer

Binomial name
- Stomias atriventer Garman, 1899

Species of fish

Stomias atriventer is a species of deep-sea mesopelagic fish in the genus Stomias. The species has been observed in the Pacific Ocean off the coast of California, and fully-grown adults can reach a maximum length of ~25 centimeters.
