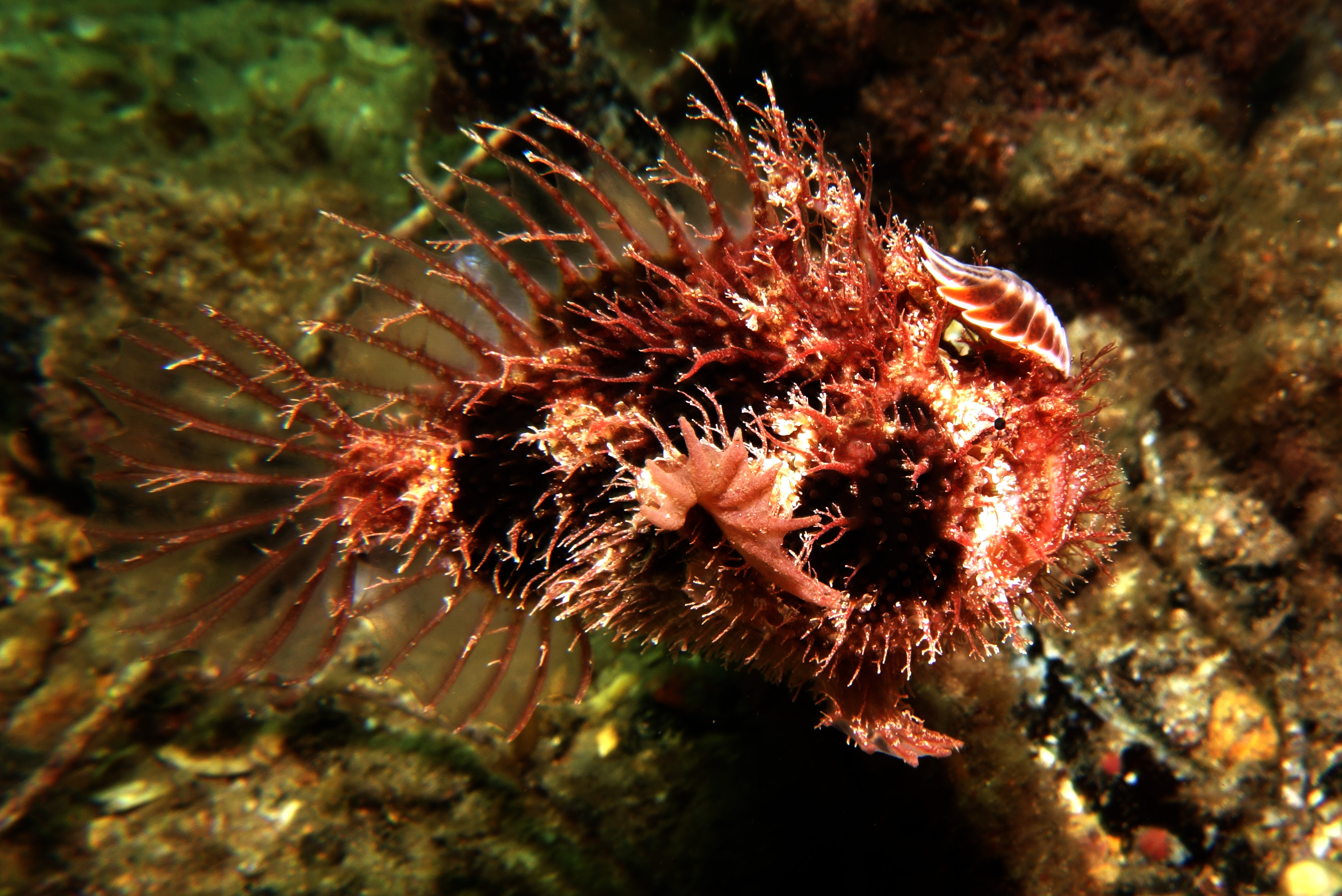
- Rhycherus filamentosus

Scientific classification
- Kingdom: Animalia
- Phylum: Chordata
- Class: Actinopterygii
- Order: Lophiiformes
- Family: Antennariidae
- Subfamily: Rhycherinae
- Genus: Rhycherus; J. D. Ogilby, 1907

Type species
- Rhycherus wildii Ogilby, 1907

= Rhycherus =

Genus of fishes

Rhycherus is a genus of marine ray-finned fishes belonging to the subfamily Histiophryninae in the family Antennariidae, the frogfishes. The fishes in this genus are endemic to the waters off Australia. This genus is classified in the monogeneric family Rhycheridae, the Balrog frogfishes, by some authorities.

== Taxonomy ==
Rhycherus was first proposed as a monospecific genus in 1907 by the Australian ichthyologist James Douglas Ogilby when he described Rhycherus wildii. R. wildii had its type locality given as South Australia, this taxon is now considered to be a junior synonym of Chironectes filamentosus, originally described by François-Louis Laporte, comte de Castelnau in 1872 from St Vincent Gulf in South Australia. Some authorities classify this genus in the subfamily Histiophryninae within the family Antennariidae, while others place it in the monotypic family Rhycheridae. However, the 5th edition of Fishes of the World does not recognise subfamilies within the Antennariidae, instead classifying the family, including this genus, within the suborder Antennarioidei and the order Lophiiformes, the anglerfishes.

== Etymology ==
Rhycherus is Greek and means "ragged", an allusion to the shaggy appearance of R. filamentosus.

== Species ==
Rhycherus currently has two recognized species classified within it:

- Rhycherus filamentosus Castelnau, 1872 (Tasselled anglerfish)
- Rhycherus gloveri Pietsch, 1984 (Glover's anglerfish)

== Characteristics ==
Rhycherus anglerfishes' second and third dorsal spines are not hidden underneath their skin. All of the fin rays in their caudal fin are forked. They have smooth skin with many closely set cutaneous appendages instead of dermal denticles. Their third dorsal spin is mostly free, with only the basal quarter to third connected to the nape by a membrane. The largest species in the genus is R. filamentosus, which has a maximum published total length of 23 cm (9.1 in).

== Distribution and habitat ==
Rhycherus anglerfishes are endemic to Australia. R. filamentosus is found in southeastern Australia while R. gloveri is found in southwestern Australia. Both species of anglerfish occur on algal-covered rocky reefs at depths down to around 150 m (490 ft).

== Biology ==
Rhycherus anglerfish are oviparous. The eggs laid by the females are large, and each egg is adhered to the surface of a rock by a long filament. The male then guards the eggs with his body, protecting him until the offspring emerge. Like other anglerfish, these fish are ambush predators, luring in prey with their illicium or esca.
