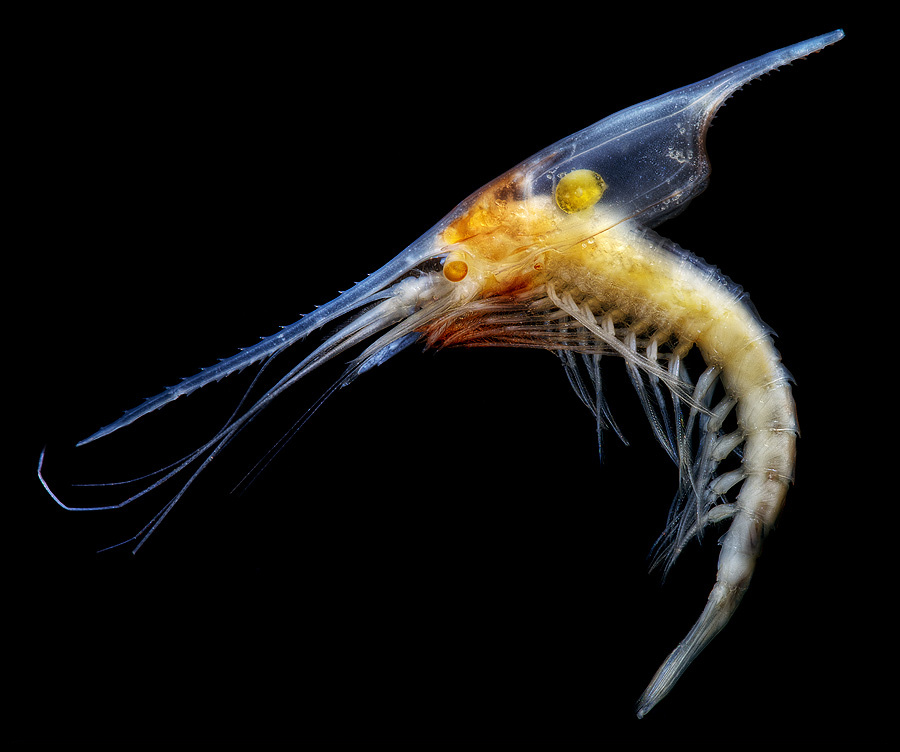
- Adult G. zoea

Scientific classification
- Kingdom: Animalia
- Phylum: Arthropoda
- Class: Malacostraca
- Order: Lophogastrida
- Family: Gnathophausiidae; Udrescu, 1984
- Genus: Gnathophausia; Willemoes-Suhm, 1875

= Gnathophausia =

Genus of crustaceans

Gnathophausia is a genus of lophogastrid crustacean. There are 10 species recognized in the genus Gnathophausia:

- Gnathophausia affinis G. O. Sars, 1883
- Gnathophausia childressi Casanova, 1996
- Gnathophausia elegans G. O. Sars, 1883
- Gnathophausia fagei Casanova, 1996
- Gnathophausia gigas Willemoes-Suhm, 1875
- Gnathophausia gracilis Willemoes-Suhm, 1875
- Gnathophausia ingens (Dohrn, 1870)
- Gnathophausia longispina G. O. Sars, 1883
- Gnathophausia scapularis Ortmann, 1906
- Gnathophausia zoea Willemoes-Suhm, 1875
