= Stomias danae =

Conservation status
- Least Concern (IUCN 3.1)

Scientific classification
- Domain: Eukaryota
- Kingdom: Animalia
- Phylum: Chordata
- Class: Actinopterygii
- Order: Stomiiformes
- Family: Stomiidae
- Genus: Stomias
- Species: S. danae

Binomial name
- Stomias danae Ege, 1933

Species of fish

Stomias danae is a species of deep-sea mesopelagic fish in the genus Stomias. The species has been observed in the Pacific Ocean.
