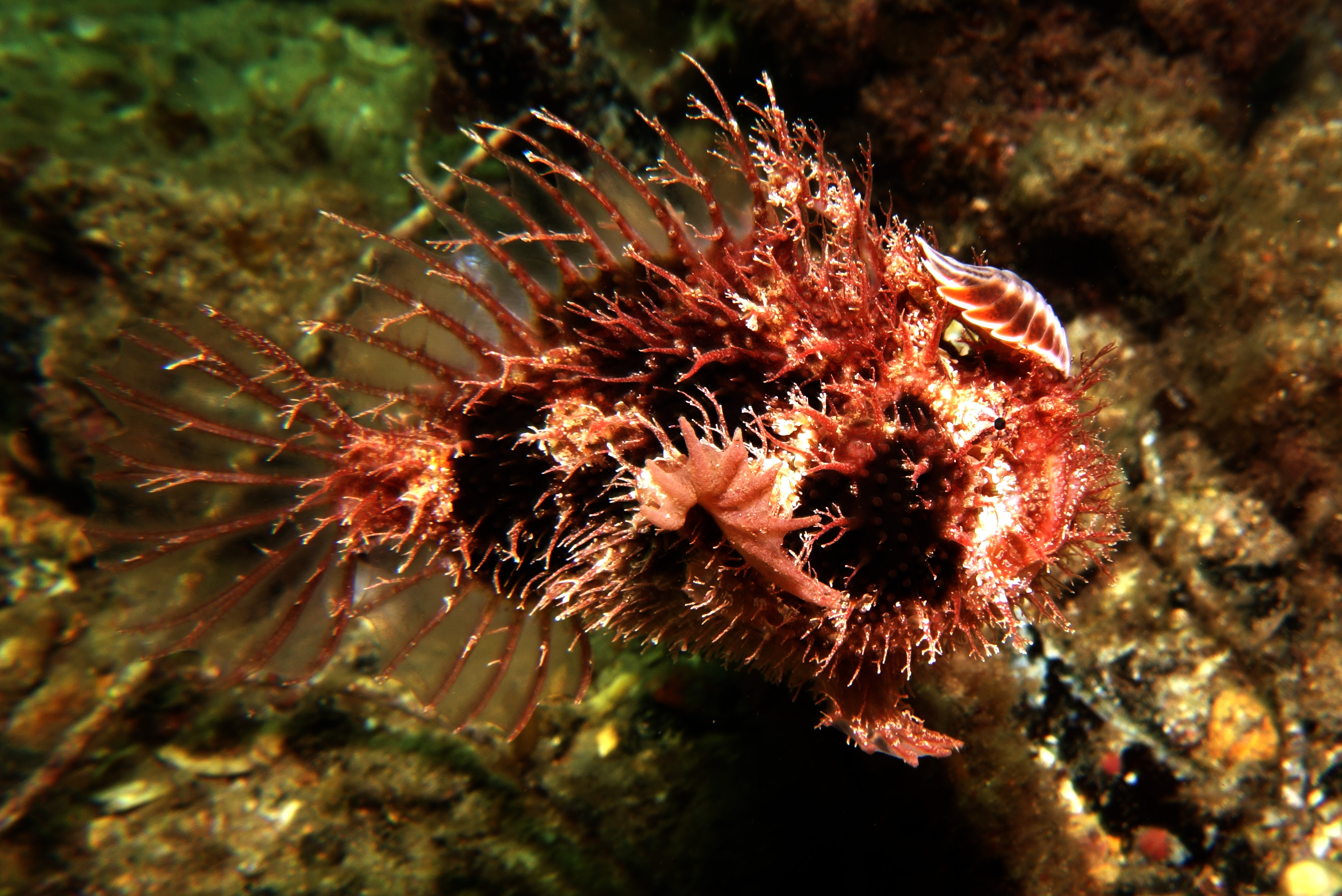

Conservation status
- Least Concern (IUCN 3.1)

Scientific classification
- Kingdom: Animalia
- Phylum: Chordata
- Class: Actinopterygii
- Order: Lophiiformes
- Family: Antennariidae
- Genus: Rhycherus
- Species: R. filamentosus

Binomial name
- Rhycherus filamentosus (Castelnau, 1872)

Synonyms
- Chironectes bifurcatus McCoy, 1886; Chironectes filamentosus Castelnau, 1872; Rhycherus wildii Ogilby, 1907

= Rhycherus filamentosus =

Species of fish

Rhycherus filamentosus, commonly known as the tasselled anglerfish, is a species of frogfish endemic to southern Australia in the southwestern Pacific Ocean and southeastern Indian Ocean. It is a well-camouflaged predator and lies in wait on the seabed for unwary prey to approach too close.

== Taxonomy ==
This fish was one of a number of species of fish trawled up from Gulf St Vincent in Southern Australia by Frederick George Waterhouse, the curator of the South Australian Museum. He sent these specimens to the French naturalist Francis de Laporte de Castelnau who was the French consul in Melbourne. de Castelnau formally described this fish in 1872, giving it the name Chironectes filamentosus, but it was later transferred to the genus Rhycherus, making it Rhycherus filamentosus.

== Description ==
Frogfish in this family have compressed, globose bodies, laterally-placed eyes and large, obliquely-slanting mouths. The first dorsal spine is modified into an elongated, slender illicium which is tipped by an esca, a whitish, worm-like lure. Rhycherus filamentosus can grow to a total length of about 23 cm (9 in). The skin is copiously decorated with threads and filaments that resemble fronds of red algae. The basic colour of this well-camouflaged fish is reddish-brown, with vertical bars and patches of dark and pale brown, and whitish underparts.

== Distribution and habitat ==
Rhycherus filamentosus is endemic to Australia and occurs in the southeastern Indian Ocean as well as the southwestern Pacific Ocean. Its range extends from Spencer Gulf in South Australia at 130°E to the eastern end of the Bass Strait at 149°E. It is associated with reefs and can be found down to about 60 m (200 ft).

== Ecology ==
A benthic fish, R. filamentosus lives on the seabed and rarely swims, instead moving around with its pectoral and pelvic fins in a kind of "walk". It is a well-camouflaged ambush predator; it rests on the seabed and when a potential prey approaches, it starts to waggle its esca. If the prey comes closer, the fish positions itself for action, and then strikes with great rapidity by opening its mouth and drawing in the prey by suction.
