= Gnathophausia ingens =

Scientific classification
- Kingdom: Animalia
- Phylum: Arthropoda
- Class: Malacostraca
- Order: Lophogastrida
- Family: Gnathophausiidae
- Genus: Gnathophausia
- Species: G. ingens

Binomial name
- Gnathophausia ingens (Dohrn, 1870)

Synonyms
- Neognathophausia ingens (Dohrn, 1870)

Species of crustacean

Gnathophausia ingens, the giant red mysid, is a species of lophogastrid crustacean with a pantropical distribution. The adults may reach 35 cm (14 in) long, including the rostrum. Females may brood their young for up to 530 days. Brooding females live between 900 and 1,400 m (3,000–4,600 ft) in the eastern Pacific Ocean off California. They do not feed during this time. When they feed, they prey on smaller crustaceans.
