= Metaphoetesis =

Ecological term

Metaphoetesis is an ecological term coined by G. E. Hutchinson, to denote a change in diet with a changing stage of the life cycle of an animal. This characteristic, exhibited by many species such as insects and fishes, is important in determining the length of a food chain, particularly in aquatic and amphibious environments. Smaller, i.e., younger specimens belong to foodchain links below the larger -older- specimens. The concept has been described by other authors using various terms such as "life history omnivory".

For instance, lake trout (Salvelinus namaycush Walbaum, 1792 Salmonidae), a Holoarctic freshwater fish species, exhibit different growth patterns within a single lake at a given time and among ensembles of similar lake types. These growth patterns are related to the species' food habits, and have consequences in growth rate, age at maturity, etc. Small, fast-growing, precocious adult trouts are planktivores, and inhabit lakes that are devoid of fish prey, while large, slow-growing, delayed maturation trouts are piscivores and inhabit lakes where fish prey is abundant (Kerr, 1979).

A more recent article, not related to metaphoetesis per se, associates the reduction of lake trout populations in North American and European lakes to acid rain which wiped out the populations of Mysis species (Mysis relicta and Mysis salemaai in Europe and Mysis diluviana in North America). These are rather large (ca. 2.5 cm long) benthopelagic crustaceans that thrive in oligotrophic, well-oxygenated waters, precisely the habitat of lake trout. No reference is made to whether these trout populations are intermediate in size and maturation age between the planktivore and the piscivore.
