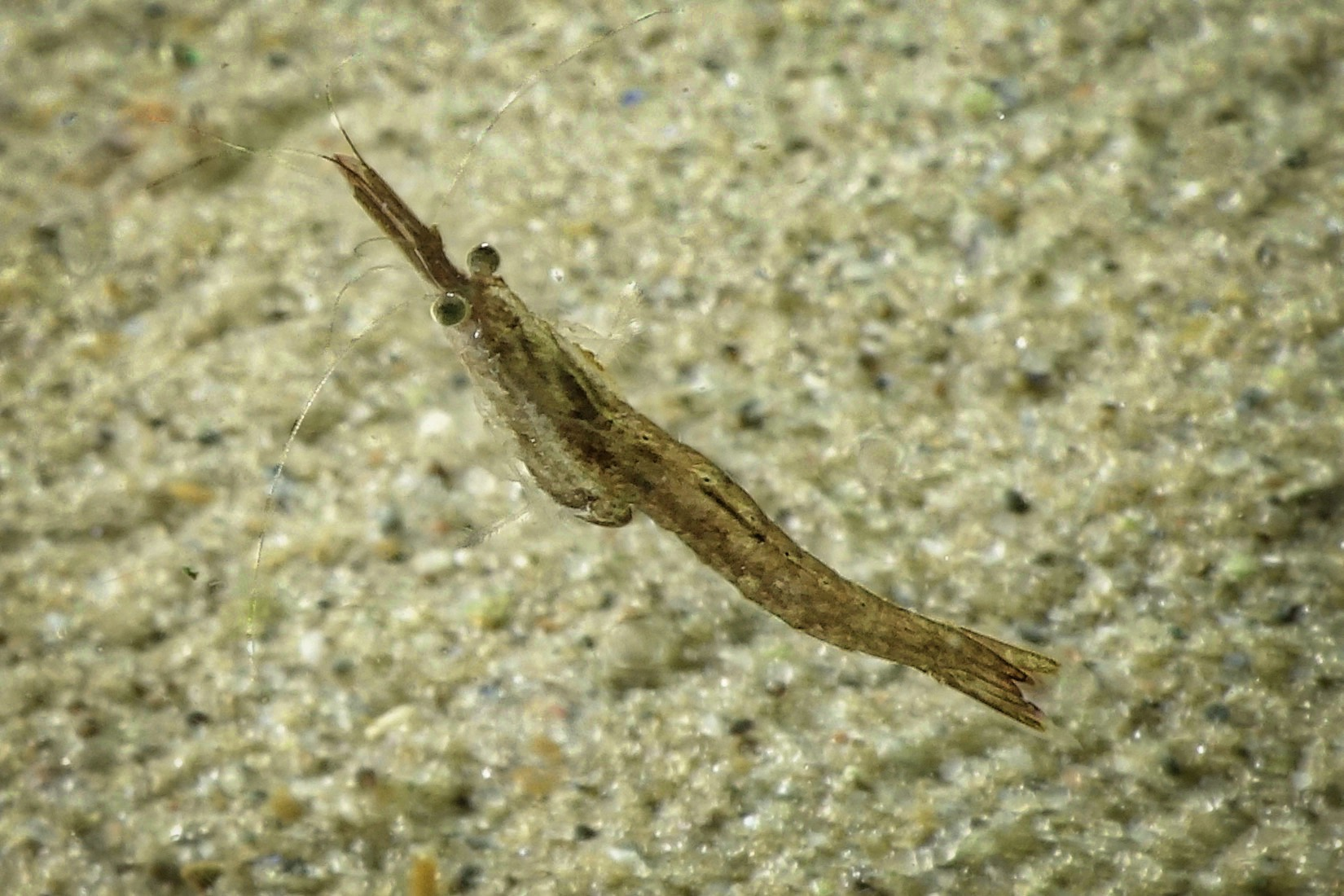

Scientific classification
- Kingdom: Animalia
- Phylum: Arthropoda
- Class: Malacostraca
- Order: Mysida
- Family: Mysidae
- Genus: Praunus
- Species: P. flexuosus

Binomial name
- Praunus flexuosus (O. F. Müller, 1776)

= Praunus flexuosus =

Species of crustacean

Praunus flexuosus, known as the chameleon shrimp, is a species of opossum shrimp found in European waters. It reaches 26 mm (1.0 in) long, with a distinctly bent body, and closely resembles Praunus neglectus. It lives in shallow water and tolerates a wide range of salinities. It is found from northern France to the Baltic Sea, and was introduced to North America in the mid 20th century.

== Description ==
Praunus flexuosus is a long, slender animal, with a pronounced bend in the abdomen. It reaches sexual maturity at a length of around 18 millimetres (0.71 in), but can go on to attain a length of 26 mm (1.0 in). Its colouration is highly variable, ranging from brown or red to green, which accounts for its common name of "chamaeleon shrimp".

Praunus flexuosus is very similar to the related species P. neglectus. The two can be differentiated by the following characters:

Character	P. flexuosus	P. neglectus
Body length	25–26 mm (1.0 in)	20 mm (0.8 in)
Colour	black to colourless	usually grass green
Setae on antennal scale and uropods	colourless	violet or reddish purple
Antennal scale length	>3× peduncle	<3× peduncle
Antennal scale shape	7–8× as long as broad	5× as long as broad
Apex of antennal scale	shorter than spine terminating outer margin	longer than spine terminating outer margin
Tarsus of thoracic limbs 3–7	6 segmented	5 segmented
Tarsus of thoracic limb 8	5 segmented	4 segmented
Lateral margins of telson	21–27 small spines	18–20 larger spines
Cleft in telson	widely open, 1/6 of telson length	proximally narrow, 1/5 of telson length

== Taxonomy ==
Praunus flexuosus was the first mysidacean species ever to be formally described, when Otto Friedrich Müller described it under the name Cancer flexuosa in 1776.

== Distribution and ecology ==
Praunus flexuosus lives along the coast of the north Atlantic Ocean between 40° north and 71° north, and in the Baltic Sea. There is only one doubtful record from further south than Roscoff. It is "the only documented non-native marine zooplankton species established on the East Coast [of North America]". It was first discovered in North America in 1960, on the north side of Cape Cod, and has since colonised as far north as Nova Scotia. This colonisation may have occurred after P. flexuosus was transported as a fouling animal on ships' hulls during the Second World War. It was only discovered around the coast of Iceland in 1970, but has since proved to be common along Iceland's south-west coast. This introduction may also have been facilitated by wartime convoys (see Battle of the Atlantic).

Praunus flexuosus can tolerate salinities of 2‰–33‰. It is often found on algae, and is most closely associated with the seaweed Fucus vesiculosus. It lives in shallow water, and is often found around artificial constructions, such as docks. It is an omnivore, feeding on debris and preying on small crustaceans, especially harpacticoid copepods, but consumes a greater proportion of macrozooplankton than other common littoral mysids, such as Neomysis integer and Praunus inermis. P. fleuosus is less gregarious than species such as N. integer. When it detects a predator nearby, using a combination of visual and chemical cues, P. flexuosus hides among vegetation.

== Life cycle ==
Praunus flexuosus has two generations per year. A population overwinters, and produces a spring generation that appears in May or June, before dying off in the summer. Some of the spring generation reach sexual maturity and reproduce in the autumn, producing the generation which will reproduce the following spring. Females release eggs into a brood pouch or marsupium, where they are held until they hatch.
