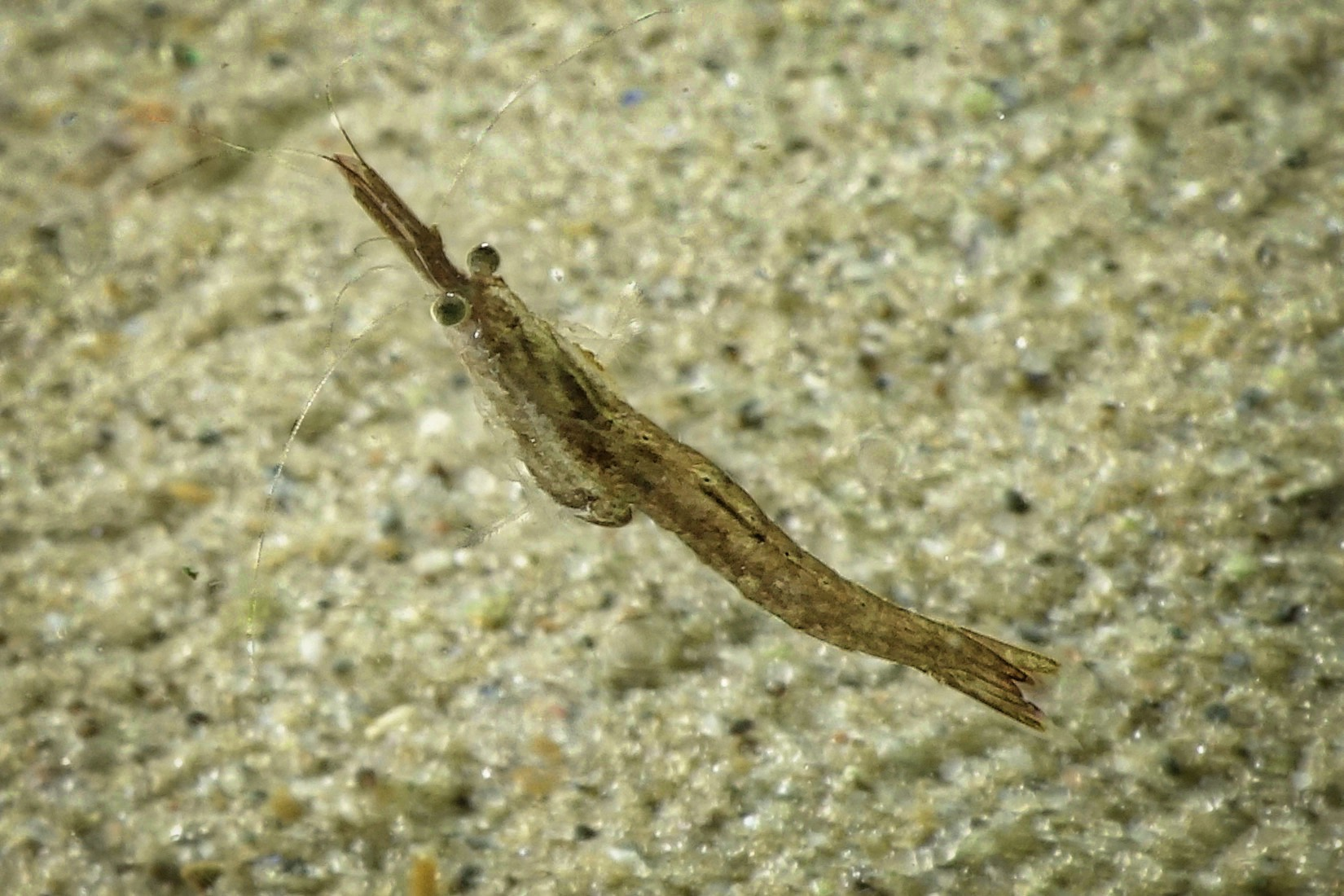
- Praunus flexuosus

Scientific classification
- Domain: Eukaryota
- Kingdom: Animalia
- Phylum: Arthropoda
- Class: Malacostraca
- Order: Mysida
- Family: Mysidae
- Subfamily: Mysinae
- Tribe: Paramysini
- Genus: Praunus; Leach, 1814

= Praunus =

Genus of crustaceans

Praunus is a genus of mysid shrimp, comprising three species:

- Praunus flexuosus (Müller, 1776)
- Praunus inermis (Rathke, 1843)
- Praunus neglectus (G. O. Sars, 1869)

When originally named in 1814 by William Elford Leach, the genus contained P. flexuosus (the type species), and a second species, "P. integer", which is now known as Neomysis integer.
