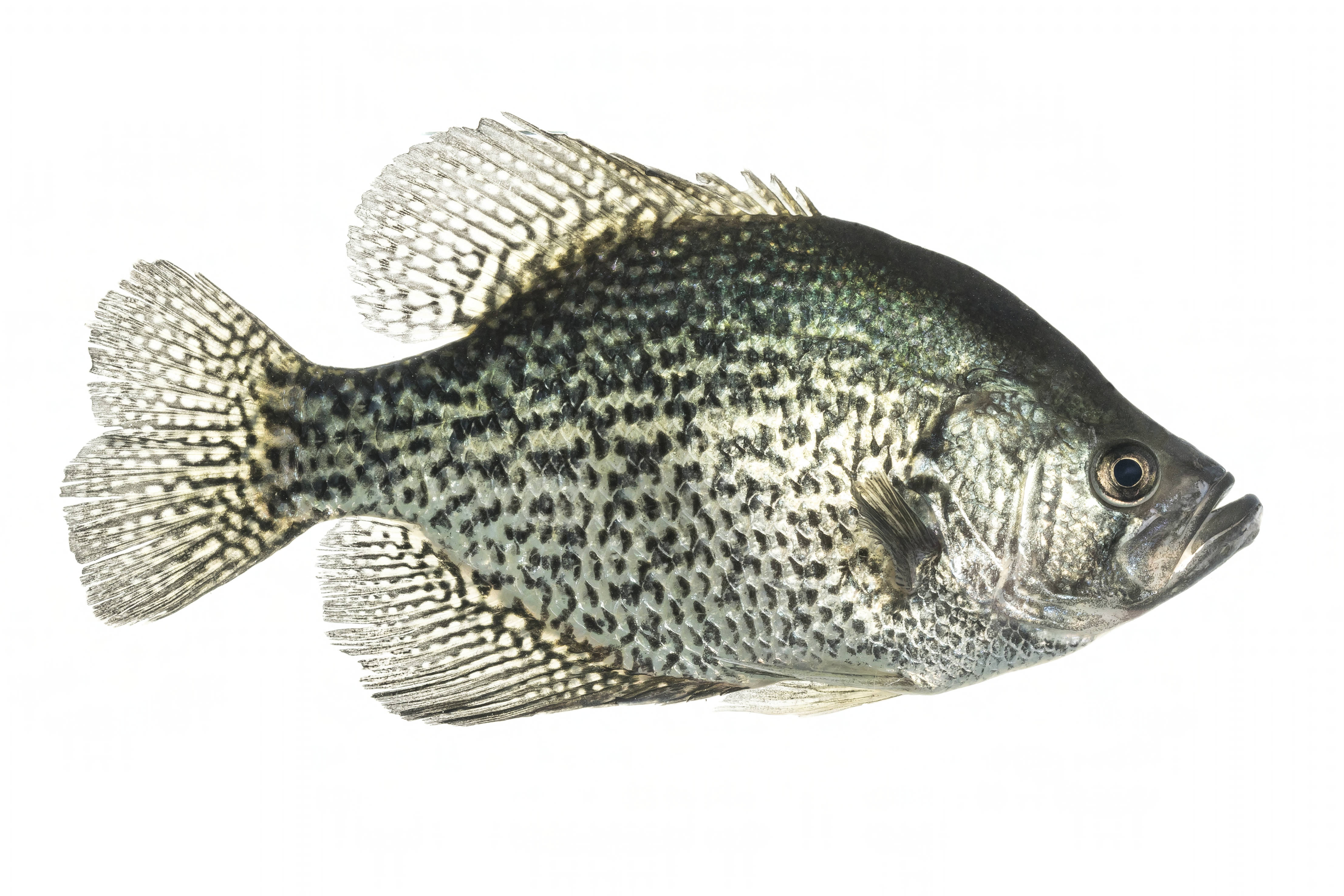

Conservation status
- Least Concern (IUCN 3.1)

- Secure (NatureServe)

Scientific classification
- Kingdom: Animalia
- Phylum: Chordata
- Class: Actinopterygii
- Division: Teleostei
- Order: Centrarchiformes
- Family: Centrarchidae
- Genus: Pomoxis
- Species: P. nigromaculatus

Binomial name
- Pomoxis nigromaculatus (Lesueur, 1829)

Synonyms
- List: Cantharus nigromaculatus Lesueur, 1829; Lepomis nigromaculatus (Lesueur, 1829); Pomoxis sparoides (Lacepède, 1801); Centrarchus hexacanthus Valenciennes, 1831; Pomoxis hexacanthus (Valenciennes, 1831)

= Black crappie =

Species of fish

The black crappie (Pomoxis nigromaculatus) is a freshwater fish in the sunfish family (Centrarchidae). It is endemic to North America, one of the two types of crappies. It is very similar to the white crappie (P. annularis) in size, shape, and habits, except that it is darker, with a pattern of black spots. Alternate names for the species include calico bass, speck, speckled perch, speckled bass, moonfish, grass bass, strawberry bass, shiner, crappie, oswego bass, sac-a-lait, and marigane noire.

== Taxonomy ==
The genus name Pomoxis comes from the Greek words "poma" and "oxys." These words are related to the fish's sharp operculum, or gill cover. The name refers to the sharp and spiny structure around the fish's gills. The species name nigromaculatus comes from Latin and means "black-spotted." This name also describes the dark spots and markings that can be seen on the body of the black crappie.

== Description ==
Black crappies are most accurately identified by the seven or eight spines on its dorsal fin (white crappies have five or six dorsal spines). Crappies have a deep and laterally compressed body. They are usually silvery-gray to green in color and show irregular or mottled black splotches over the entire body. Black crappies have rows of dark spots on their dorsal, anal, and caudal fins. The dorsal and anal fins resemble each other in shape. Both crappies have large mouths extending to below the eye, and thin lips—both suggestive of their piscivorous feeding habits. Crappies are typically about 4–8 inches (10–20 cm) long. The current all-tackle fishing world record for a black crappie is 2.47 kg (5 lb 7 oz). The maximum length reported for a black crappie is 19.3 inches (49 cm) and the maximum published weight is just under 6 pounds (2,700 g).

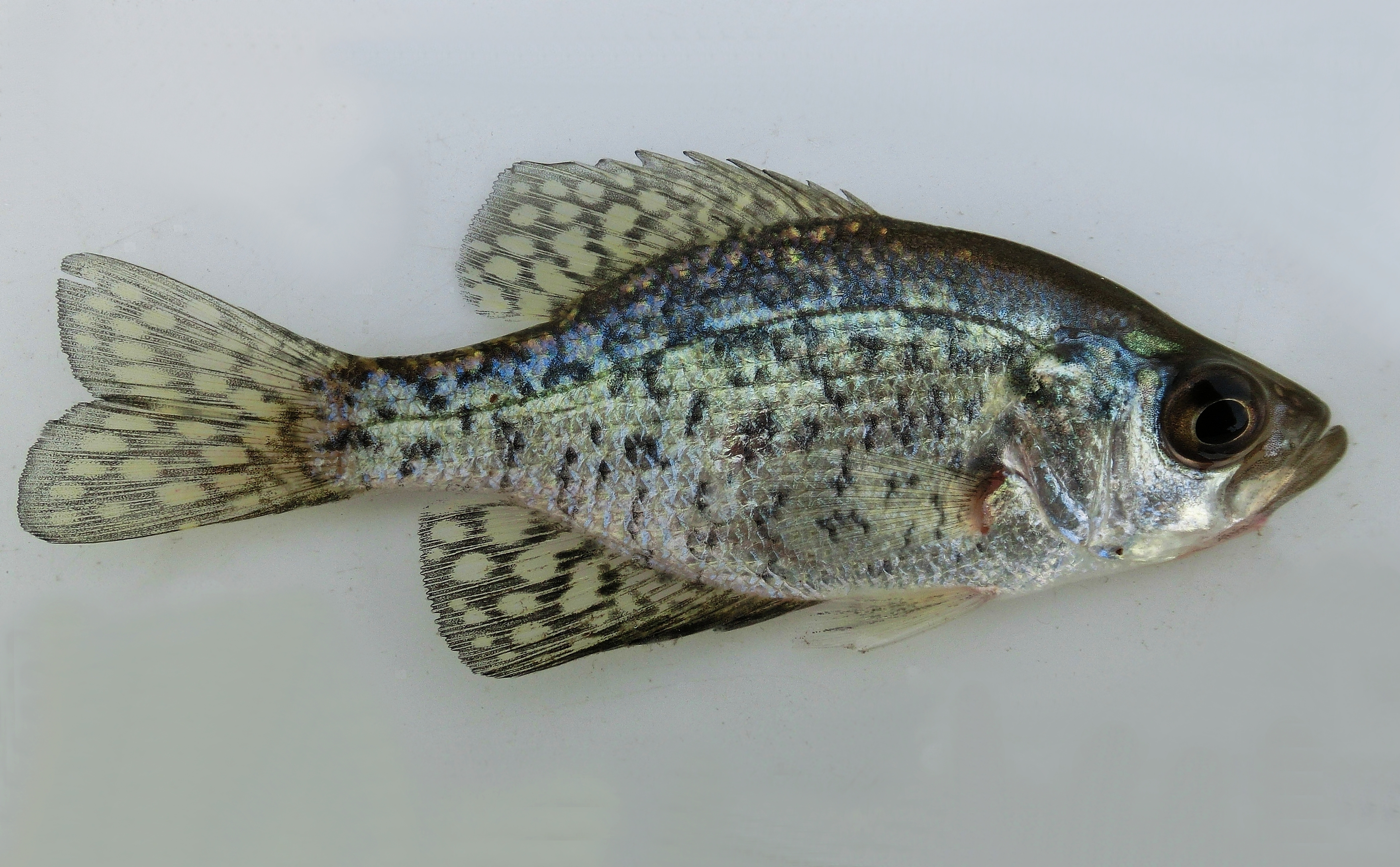
At San Joaquin Valley, California

== Distribution ==
The black crappie's range is uncertain, since it has been widely transplanted, but it is presumed to be similar to the white crappie's. Its native range is suspected to be in the eastern United States and Canada, and as of 2005, populations existed in all of the 48 contiguous U.S. states. Introduced populations also exist in Mexico and Panama.

== Habitat ==
The black crappie's habitats are lakes, reservoirs, borrow pits, and navigation pools in large rivers. They prefer areas with little or no current, clear water, and abundant cover such as submerged timber or aquatic vegetation, as well as sand or mud bottoms like those found in lakes, ponds, streams, and sloughs.

Like P. annularis, P. nigromaculatus is very prolific and can tend to overpopulate its environment, with negative consequences both for the crappie and for other fish species. A commercial supplier of the fish, however, claims that it can be safely stocked in ponds as small as one acre (0.40 hectares) in area.

== Diet ==
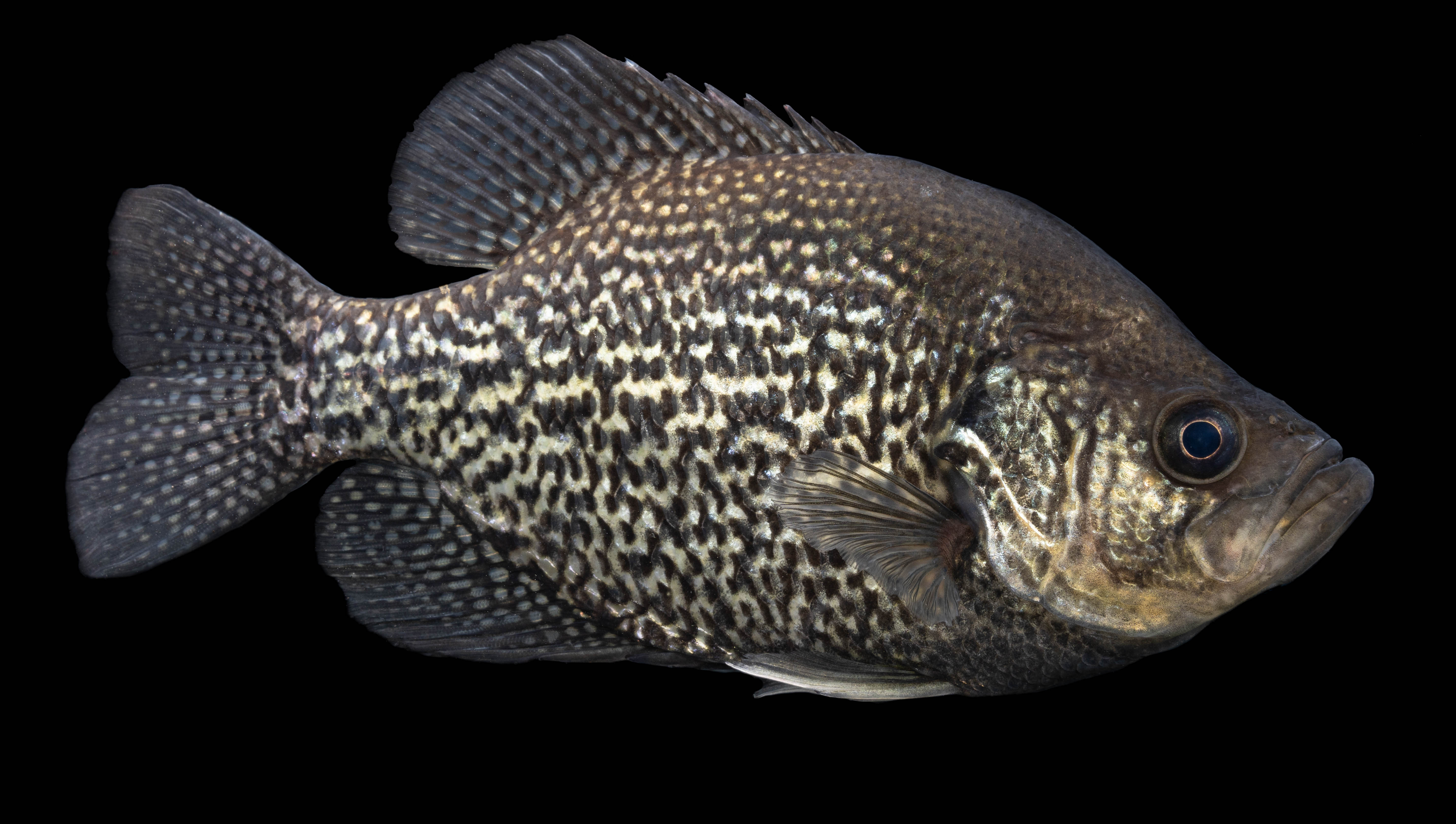
At Gavins Point National Fish Hatchery

Crappies feed early in the morning and from about midnight until approximately 2 am. Individuals smaller than about 16 centimetres (6.3 in) in length eat plankton and minuscule crustaceans, while larger individuals feed on small fish (like shad), as well as minnows. Adult black crappies feed on fewer fish than white crappies do; instead they consume a larger volume of insects, insect larvae and crustaceans. According to scientific studies carried out in California, the mysid shrimp Neomysis awatschensis and amphipods of genus Corophium were most commonly eaten by all sizes of black crappie, followed by copepods, cladocerans and chironomid larvae and pupae. Although this diet is popular among black crappies in general, their diet may significantly change based on habitat, availability of food, and other biotic factors such as amount of resource competition. The same study also showed that young, small crappie tend to feed on small aquatic invertebrate animals and changed to a fish-filled diet as they matured to adulthood. Its diet, as an adult, tends to be less dominated by other fish than that of the white crappie.

== Relationships with humans ==
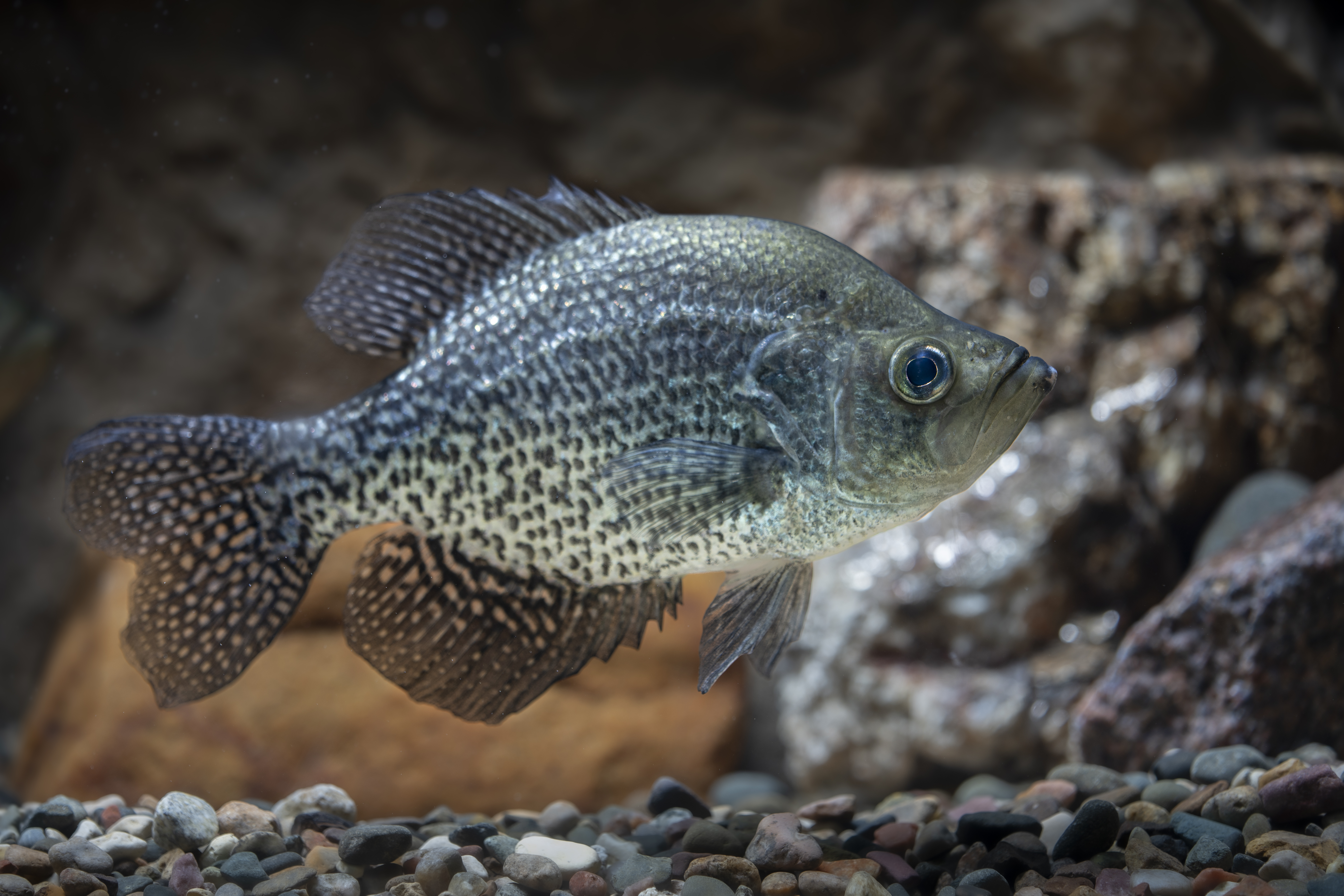
At Gavins Point National Fish Hatchery

Crappies are a very popular sport fish, as they are easy to catch during their feeding times. There are minimal number and size restriction limits for fishing the crappie species.

== Angling ==
Crappie are commonly caught on small jigs and minnow rigs. Unlike their cousins, the white crappies, black crappies are more commonly caught in clear water around structure. A common technique is spider rigging, in which one usually has eight long rods protruding from the boat, all rigged with minnows. Fishermen can also troll for crappie with small cranks. When trolling, one should use electronics to locate suspending groups and bring one's lure near them. Another technique for fishing docks is dock shooting, or arrow casting. To arrow cast, one should use a spinning reel. Fishermen open their bail, hold the lure and push the rod forward so that the rod is bent. They then aim the lure where they want to cast, and they simultaneously let go of the lure and release the line. This technique is used to cast the lure into the small space under a dock or tree.

== Conservation status ==
Black crappies can be safely harvested under minimal, reasonable regulations, as long as there is no permanent damage to the fishery or environment. The black crappie is not listed as a species under threat on the IUCN Red List.

== Reproduction and life cycle ==
Black crappies mature at two to four years. Growth during the first four years of their life is faster in the warm waters of the southern part of its range than in cooler waters in the north. White crappie have a higher growth rate in terms of length than black crappie. Most fish that are caught for sport are between two and five years old.

The breeding season varies by location, due to the species' great range. Breeding temperature is 14‒20 °C (58‒68 °F) and spawning occurs in spring and early summer. Spawning occurs in a nest built by the male. Males use their bodies and tails to sweep out an area of sand or mud in shallow water (between one and six feet deep) usually near a shoreline and vegetation to create a nest. Black crappies appear to nest in the most protected areas (such as places with woody debris or live vegetation) possible.

Female crappies produce an average of 40,000 spherical eggs, the number depending on their age and size. After spawning, the male watches over the nest until eggs hatch, which is usually about two to three days. Newly hatched fish larvae are about 2.32 millimetres (0.091 in) long and appear translucent. They stay in the nest for several days before moving to shallow, sheltered waters.

The oldest recorded age of a specimen is fifteen years, although seven years is a more typical life span for the species.
