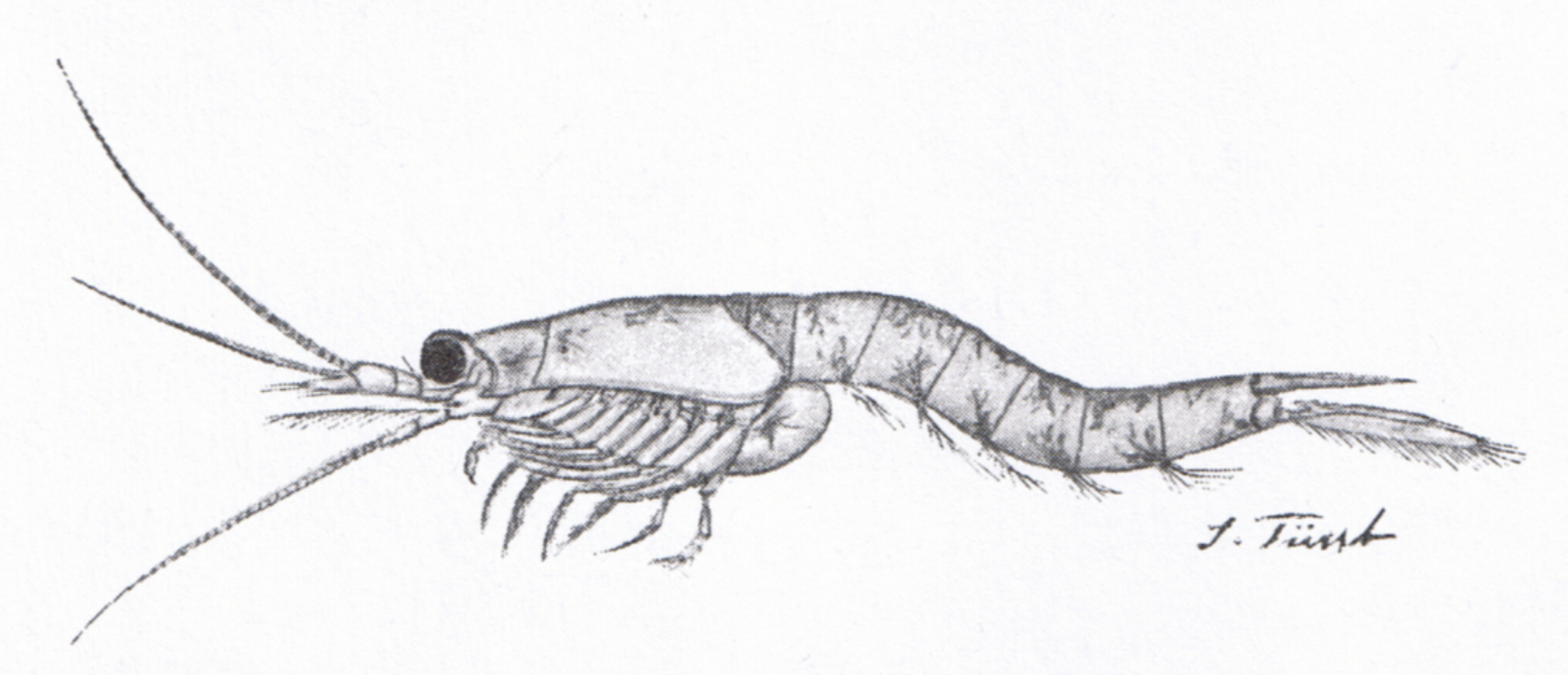
- Neomysis integer

Scientific classification
- Domain: Eukaryota
- Kingdom: Animalia
- Phylum: Arthropoda
- Class: Malacostraca
- Order: Mysida
- Family: Mysidae
- Subfamily: Mysinae
- Genus: Neomysis; Czerniavsky, 1882

Species
- See text

= Neomysis =

Genus of crustaceans

Neomysis (from the Greek affix neo-, "new", and the genus name Mysis) is a genus of opossum shrimp (mysid crustacean) from the family Mysidae, distributed in the coastal zone of temperate seas of the Northern Hemisphere and South America. Several species, particularly from the West Pacific, are also found in fresh and brackish waters. The genus contains the following 18 species:

- Neomysis americana (S. I. Smith, 1873)
- Neomysis awatschensis (Brandt, 1851)
- Neomysis czerniawskii Derzhavin, 1913
- Neomysis ilyapai Holmquist, 1957
- Neomysis integer (Leach, 1814)
- Neomysis intermedia (Czerniavsky, 1882)
- Neomysis japonica Nakazawa, 1910
- Neomysis kadiakensis Ortmann, 1908
- Neomysis mercedis Holmes, 1896
- Neomysis meridionalis Colosi, 1924
- Neomysis mirabilis (Czerniavsky, 1882)
- Neomysis monticellii Colosi, 1924
- Neomysis nakazawai Ii, 1936
- Neomysis orientalis Ii, 1964
- Neomysis patagona Zimmer, 1907
- Neomysis rayii (Murdoch, 1885)
- Neomysis sopayi Holmquist, 1957
- Neomysis spinosa Nakazawa, 1910
