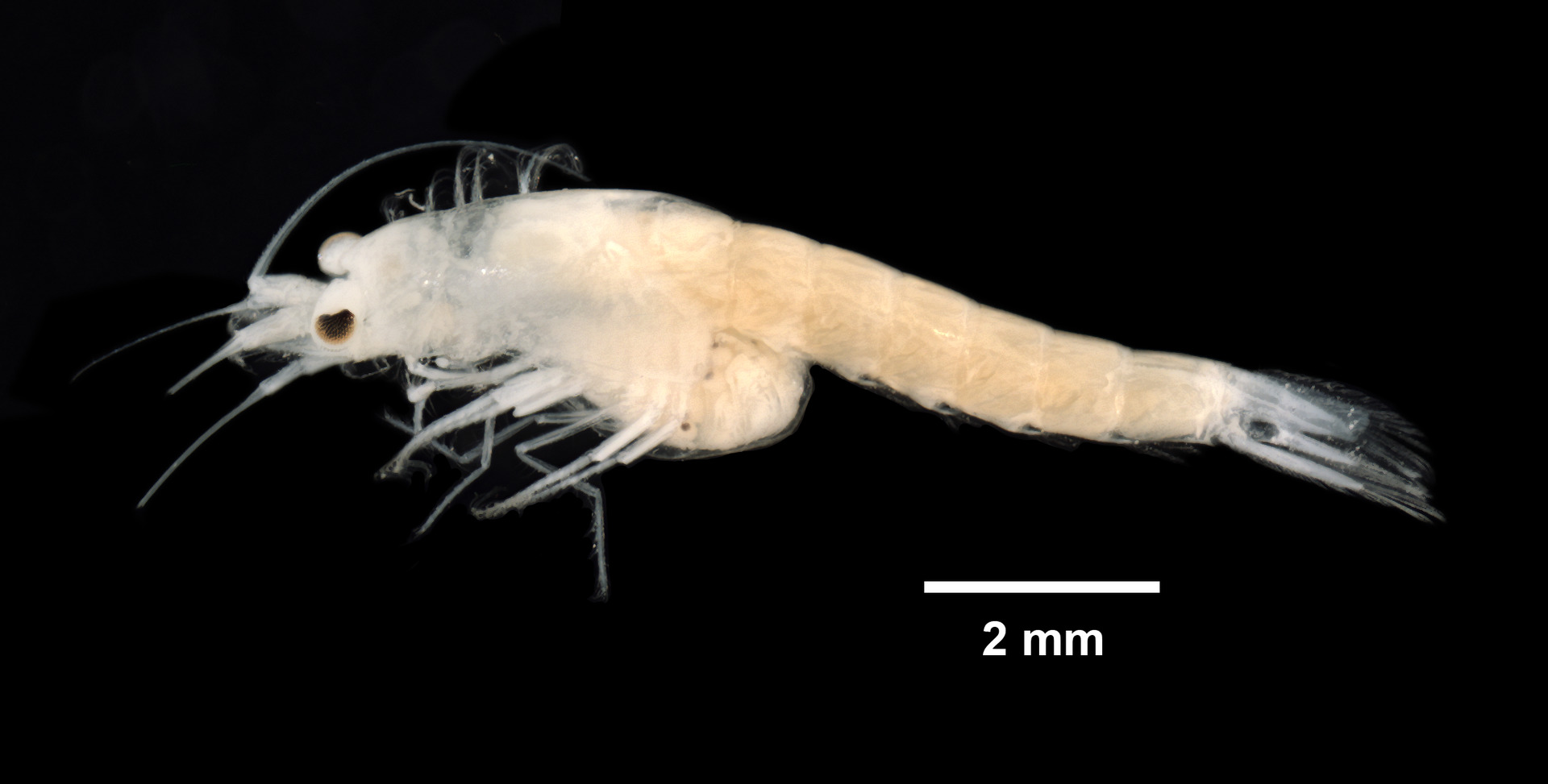
- Heteromysis formosa

Scientific classification
- Kingdom: Animalia
- Phylum: Arthropoda
- Clade: Pancrustacea
- Class: Malacostraca
- Order: Mysida
- Family: Mysidae
- Subfamily: Heteromysinae
- Tribe: Heteromysini
- Genus: Heteromysis; S.I. Smith, 1873

Type species
- Heteromysis formosa S.I. Smith, 1873

Synonyms
- Chiromysis G. O. Sars, 1877

= Heteromysis =

Genus of crustaceans

Heteromysis (from Greek heteros meaning ‘different’, and mysis, a genus name Mysis) is a genus of marine mysid crustaceans (opossum shrimps) from the family Mysidae, associated with various shallow-water invertebrates. The name describes differentiation of its pereiopods (thoracic appendages) as possible adaptation to commensal life-style. Heteromysis is one of the largest mysid genera, containing more than 100 species. The genus is distributed globally, but predominantly in tropical and subtropical waters.

== Description ==
The body is rather moderately robust. Telson trapezoidal, apically with cleft. Eyes with well developed cornea. Pereiopod 1 carpopropodus always in possession of some either smooth or modified spiniform setae. Pereopod 2 carpopropodus multisegmented. Uropodal endopod with spiniform setae on its inner margin.

Members of the genus are not known to share any unique characters. Compared to other genera of the subfamily Heteromysinae, Heteromysis is most similar to Ischiomysis, Platymysis and Retromysis. It differs from Ischiomysis by the absence of the acute process on the preischium of the pereiopod 6, the absence of the flagellated spiniform setae on its ischium, and the absence of the large apical lobes. From Platymysis it is distinguished by the general body shape, which is not compressed dorsoventrally, laking also the abdominal pleurites, the prominent distolateral lobes on the eyes and the pereiopod 1 carpopropodus segments clearly separate. Finally, Heteromysis differs from Retromysis by the distomedial setae of the antennal peduncle, directed forward instead of backwards, the absence of the posteromedial lobe on the male process of antennula and the sternal plate not projecting behind the marsupium.

== Distribution ==
Cosmopolitan. Temperate, subtropical and tropical seas of the World Ocean. Mostly concentrated in tropical and subtropical waters.

== Environment and habitat ==
Exclusively marine. Shallow water. Commensals of various invertebrates: sponges, corals, hydroids, hermit crabs, cephalopods. Some species were recorded to be facultative commensals, also inhabiting adjacent bottom substrates.

== Life history ==
Copulation was observed in H. formosa. At night time, immediately after the release of the juveniles from the female pouch, the male takes position under the molted female, clasping pereiopods around the abdomen, head to tail and the ventral surface to the ventral surface, inserting the penis between the pouch plates and ejecting sperm into the pouch chambers.

Female carry two eggs in the marsupium.

== Classification ==
Contrasting to the absence of common unique generic characters, the species of the genus group into four subgenera:

- Heteromysis sensu stricto

Members of the nominotypical subgenus are not distinguished by any unique common character, and Heteromysis s.str. traditionally has been a heterogeneous catch-all taxon. The ischium of the pereopod 1 endopod is two to three times as long as wide; medially not bearing denticles. The pleopods are unmodified in both males and females. The uropodal endopod is shorter than the exopod.

- Gnathomysis Bonnier et Perez, 1902, 4 species

Type species is Gnathomysis gerlachei Bonnier et Perez, 1902.

The ischium of the pereopod 1 endopod is nearly as long as wide, triangular, with characteristic medial denticles. The merus of the pereopod 1 endopod is semilunar in cross-section, its median margin is sulcate. The carpopropodus of the pereopod 1 is exceptionally large, longer than or as long as the merus, bearing strong medial spine-like setae. The penis is tubular, without any setae. The pleopods are unmodified both in males and females. The uropodal endopod is uniquely longer than the exopod.

- Neoheteromysis Băcescu, 1976, 1 species

Type species is Neoheteromysis muelleri Băcescu, 1976.

Its only species has unique serrations of the pereopod 1 dactylus and exceptionally long flagellated setae on the male pleopods.

- Olivemysis Băcescu, 1976, 47 species

Type species is Heteromysis rubrocincta Băcescu, 1968.

Most of the species have an acute distomedial spine (or two spines) or a tubercle on the eyestalk. And the eye cornea is slightly narrower or occasionally about as wide as thestalk. The males bear sternites with medial process. The antennular peduncle segment 3 has two distomedial flagellated spiniform setae: the nedial one is directed anteriorly, and it is shorter and thicker than another, directed laterally, seta. The ischium of the pereopod 1 endopod is about 1.5−2.5 times as long as wide. The merus of the pereopod 1 endopod has characteristic lateral barbed or serrated setae. The carpopropodus of the pereopod 1 is shorter than the merus (or as long as merus), bearing medial flagellated spine-setae. The penis has thin finger-like lobes. The pleopods of the males carry flagellated spiniform setae.

Heteromysis fosteri was named after South African filmmaker Craig Foster, after he had discovered eight new species of shrimp during a year of diving every single day while filming a common octopus. Three new species belong to Heteromysis and differ from species known at the time in colour, eye shape and spine patterns.
