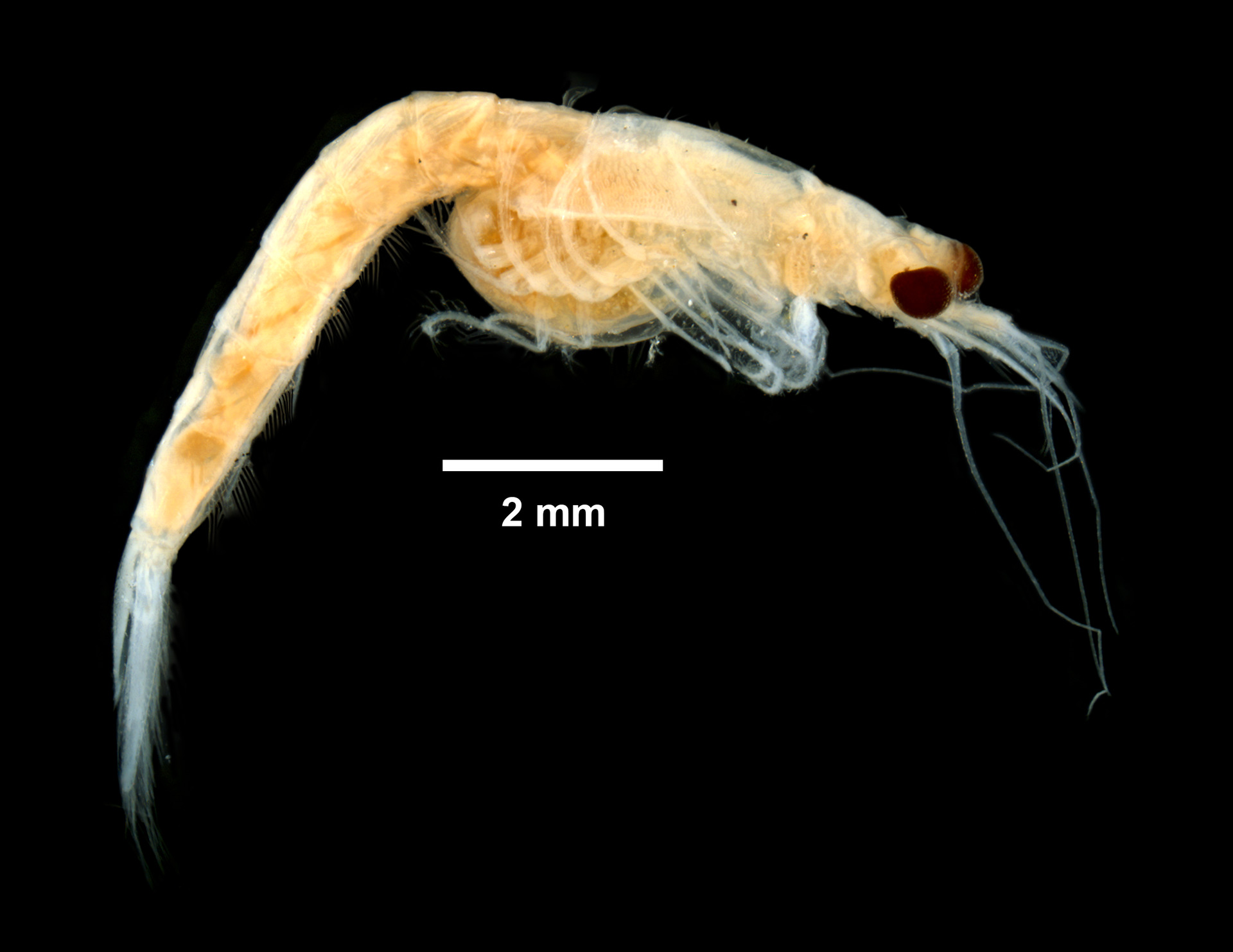

Scientific classification
- Kingdom: Animalia
- Phylum: Arthropoda
- Class: Malacostraca
- Order: Mysida
- Family: Mysidae
- Genus: Neomysis
- Species: N. americana

Binomial name
- Neomysis americana (S. I. Smith, 1873)

Synonyms
- Mysis americana Smith, 1873

= Neomysis americana =

Species of crustacean

Neomysis americana is an "extremely common" species of opossum shrimp along the Atlantic coast of North and South America. The species has a disjunct distribution, being present in an area extending from the Saint Lawrence River to Florida, and separately in parts of Argentina (Blanca Bay, Anegada Bay and Samborombón Bay). There may be a further division within the North American populations between those north of Cape Henry, Virginia (including Georges Bank) and those from North Carolina southwards. N. americana is an important prey item for a number of fish species, including the Atlantic silverside, the bluefish and the windowpane flounder, Scophthalmus aquosus. Adults typically have a carapace length of 2.5–4 millimetres (0.10–0.16 in).
