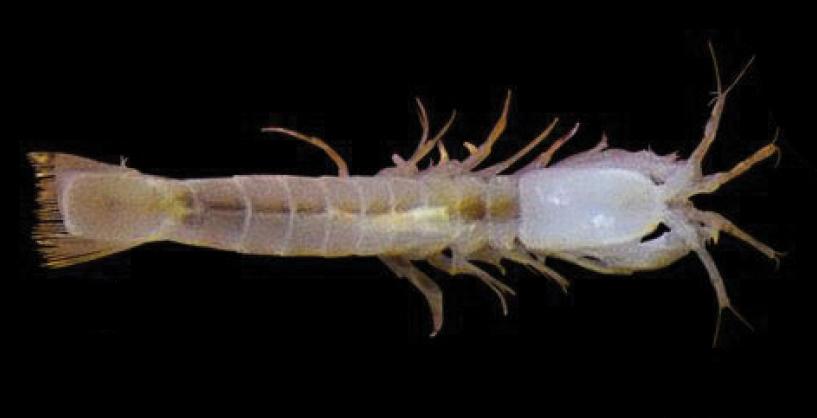
- Stygiomysis cokei

Scientific classification
- Domain: Eukaryota
- Kingdom: Animalia
- Phylum: Arthropoda
- Class: Malacostraca
- Order: Mysida
- Family: Stygiomysidae
- Genus: Stygiomysis; Caroli, 1937

= Stygiomysis =

Genus of crustaceans

Stygiomysis is the single genus of crustaceans in the family Stygiomysidae, which is variously considered part of the orders Stygiomysida or Mysida.

The species of this genus are found in Caribbean.

Species:

- Stygiomysis aemete Wagner, 1992
- Stygiomysis clarkei Bowman et al., 1984
- Stygiomysis cokei Kallmeyer & Carpenter, 1996
- Stygiomysis holthuisi (Gordon, 1958)
- Stygiomysis hydruntina Caroli, 1937
- Stygiomysis ibarrae Ortiz, Lalana & Perez, 1996
- Stygiomysis major Bowman, 1976
