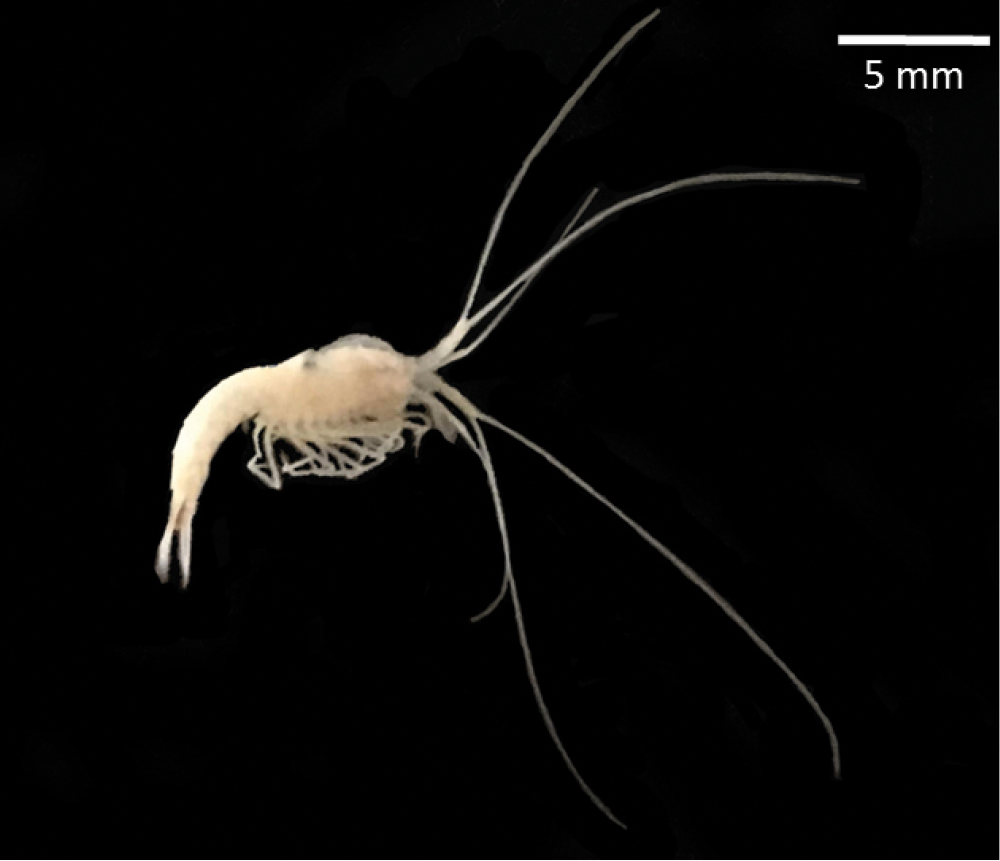
- Spelaeomysis quinterensis (Lepidomysidae)

Scientific classification
- Domain: Eukaryota
- Kingdom: Animalia
- Phylum: Arthropoda
- Class: Malacostraca
- Superorder: Peracarida
- Order: Stygiomysida; Tchindonova, 1981

= Stygiomysida =

Small order of malacostracan crustaceans

Stygiomysida is a small order of malacostracan crustaceans in the superorder Peracarida. It has traditionally been considered part of the order Mysida (opossum shrimps), but was separated from it on phylogenetic grounds.

Families:

- Lepidomysidae Clarke, 1961 (1 genus, 9 species)
- Stygiomysidae Caroli, 1937 (1 genus, 7 species)

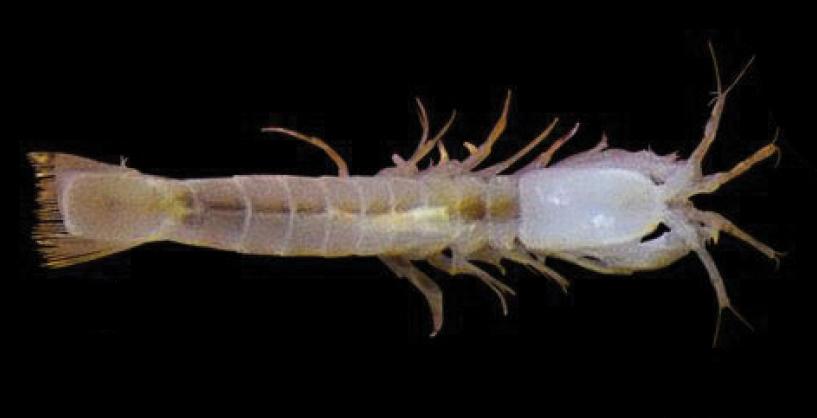
Stygiomysis cokei (Stygiomysidae)
