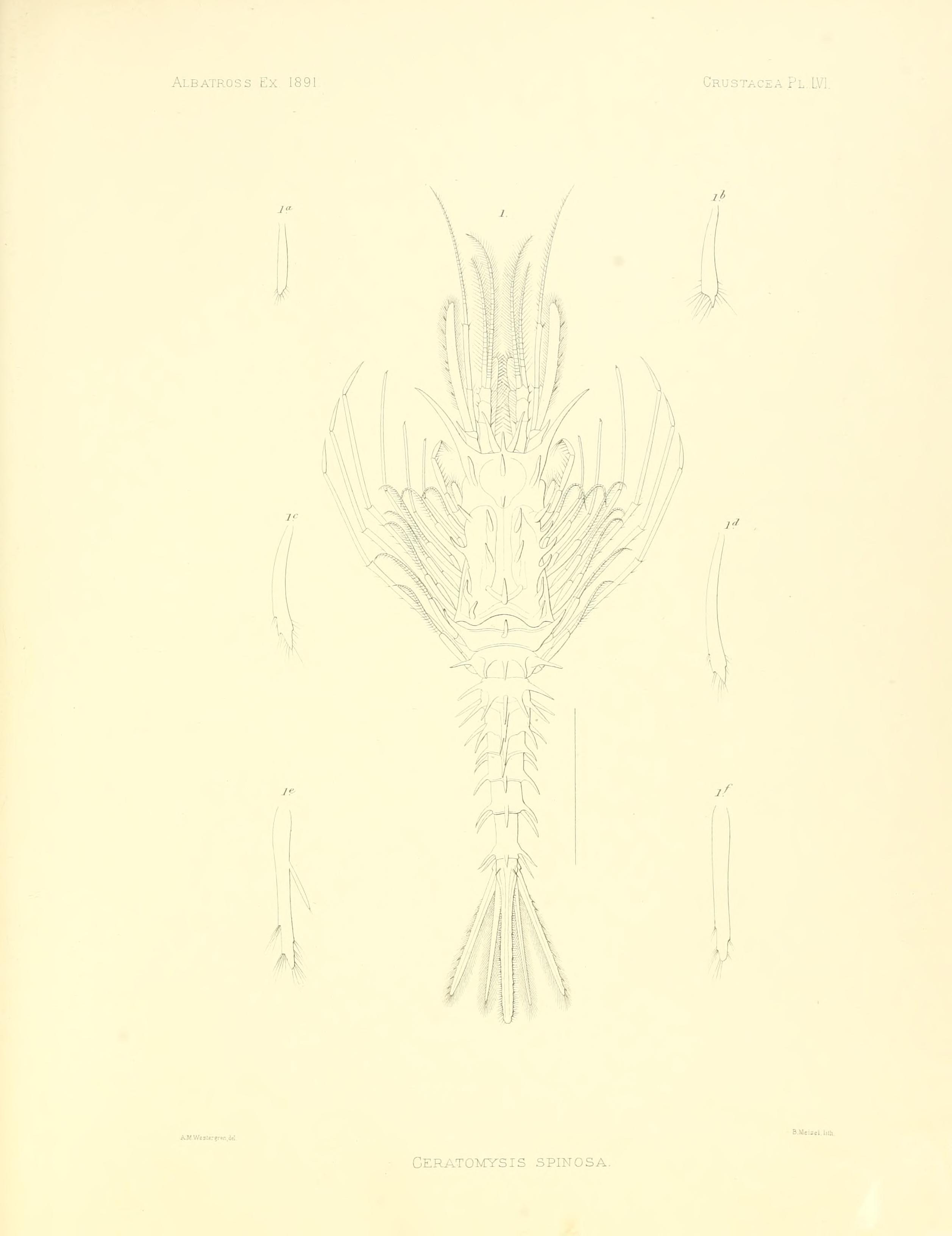
- Illustration of Ceratomysis spinosa.

Scientific classification
- Kingdom: Animalia
- Phylum: Arthropoda
- Clade: Pancrustacea
- Class: Malacostraca
- Order: Mysida
- Family: Petalophthalmidae; Czerniavsky, 1882

Genera
- See text

= Petalophthalmidae =

Family of crustaceans

Petalophthalmidae is a family of marine crustaceans in the order Mysida, the opossum shrimps.

== Characteristics ==
Petalophthalmidans are distinguished from other mysids by the fact that the first pereopod (walking leg) does not have an exopod (outer branch), the carpopropodus of the endopod (inner branch) of the 3rd to 8th pereopods are not fused and there is no statocyst on the endopod of the uropods (posterior appendage). Female petalophthalmidans have seven oostegites (flexible bristly flaps) forming the base of the marsupium or brood pouch under the thorax. Most species in this genus are bathypelagic and live on or near the seabed in the deep ocean.

== Genera ==
The following genera are recognised in the World Register of Marine Species:

  - Genus Bacescomysis Murano & Krygier, 1985
  - Genus Ceratomysis Faxon, 1893
  - Genus Hansenomysis Stebbing, 1893
  - Genus Parapetalophthalmus Murano & Bravo, 1998
  - Genus Petalophthalmus Willemoes-Suhm, 1875
  - Genus Pseudopetalophthalmus Bravo & Murano, 1997
