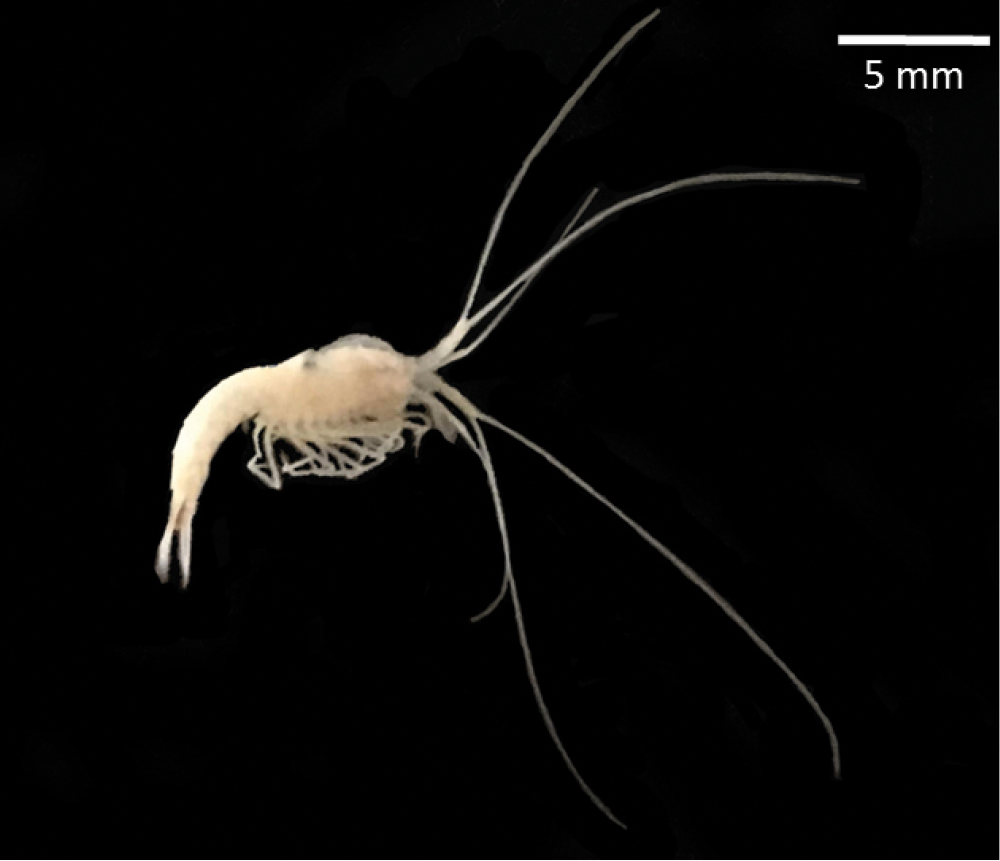
- Spelaeomysis quinterensis

Scientific classification
- Domain: Eukaryota
- Kingdom: Animalia
- Phylum: Arthropoda
- Class: Malacostraca
- Order: Mysida
- Family: Lepidomysidae
- Genus: Spelaeomysis; Caroli, 1924

Synonyms
- Lepidomysis Clarke, 1961

= Spelaeomysis =

Genus of crustaceans

Spelaeomysis is a genus of crustaceans belonging to the monotypic family Lepidomysidae, which is variously considered a part of the order Stygiomysida or Mysida.

The species of this genus are found in Europe, Northern America, Africa.

Species:

- Spelaeomysis bottazzii Caroli, 1924
- Spelaeomysis cardisomae Bowman, 1973
- Spelaeomysis cochinensis Panampunnayil & Viswakumar, 1991
- Spelaeomysis longipes (Pillai & Mariamma, 1963)
- Spelaeomysis nuniezi Bacescu & Orghidan, 1971
- Spelaeomysis olivae Bowman, 1973
- Spelaeomysis quinterensis (Villalobos, 1951)
- Spelaeomysis servatus (Fage, 1924)
- Spelaeomysis villalobosi Garcia-Garza et al., 1996
