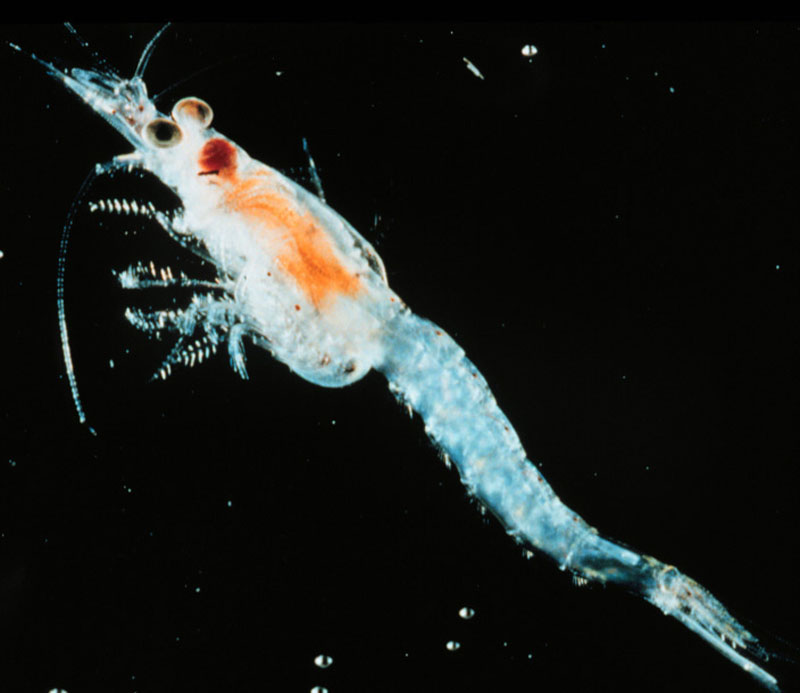

Scientific classification
- Domain: Eukaryota
- Kingdom: Animalia
- Phylum: Arthropoda
- Class: Malacostraca
- Order: Mysida
- Family: Mysidae
- Genus: Mysis
- Species: M. diluviana

Binomial name
- Mysis diluviana Audzijonyte & Väinölä, 2005

= Mysis diluviana =

Species of crustacean

Mysis diluviana is a mysid crustacean (opossum shrimp) found in freshwater lakes of northern North America.

== Appearance ==
Mysis is a small, transparent, shrimp-like crustacean less than 25 mm (1 in) in length. It has two pairs of relatively long antennae, associated with rounded antennal plates; large, stalked compound eyes; the thorax covered by a coat-like carapace; a muscular, cylindrical abdomen; and a tail fan featuring a telson with a V-shaped terminal cleft.

Reproducing females bear a prominent brood pouch (marsupium) between their thoracal legs. The pleopods (abdominal legs) of Mysis are reduced, except for a specialized pair of mating legs in males.

== Distribution and related species ==
The natural distribution of Mysis diluviana comprises the Great Lakes of North America, and many other coldwater lakes across Canada and in northern parts of the United States, including Wisconsin (e.g. Green Lake, Trout Lake, and Geneva Lake) and northern New York State (e.g. Finger Lakes, Lake Champlain). As it inhabits the areas covered by ice sheets during the last glacial period, the species has been called a glacial relict.

Mysis diluviana has also been transferred to lakes outside its native range, to provide a new fish-food object, e.g. to Lake Tahoe (Nevada, California) and Kootenay Lake (British Columbia).

Mysis diluviana is the only mysid species native in the Great Lakes and adjacent water bodies. Recently, however, another invasive mysid of European origin, Hemimysis anomala, has rapidly spread in the Great Lakes. The two species live in different habitats.

The native mysids in freshwater lakes of the Canadian Arctic and in coastal lagoons of Alaska belong to another, closely related species, Mysis segerstralei. Both M. diluviana and M. segerstralei were previously called Mysis relicta, which was until recently considered a circumpolar taxon. After revision in 2005, Mysis relicta is considered a purely European species.

== Ecology ==
Mysis diluviana is found in deep, cold oligotrophic lakes with high levels of dissolved oxygen, where it stays mainly below the thermocline.

It is an opportunistic feeder with both predatorial and filter feeding habits. When zooplankton is abundant, that serves as the primary food source; when zooplankton is scarce, diluviana will feed on phytoplankton, suspended organic detritus or from the surface of benthic organic deposits.
