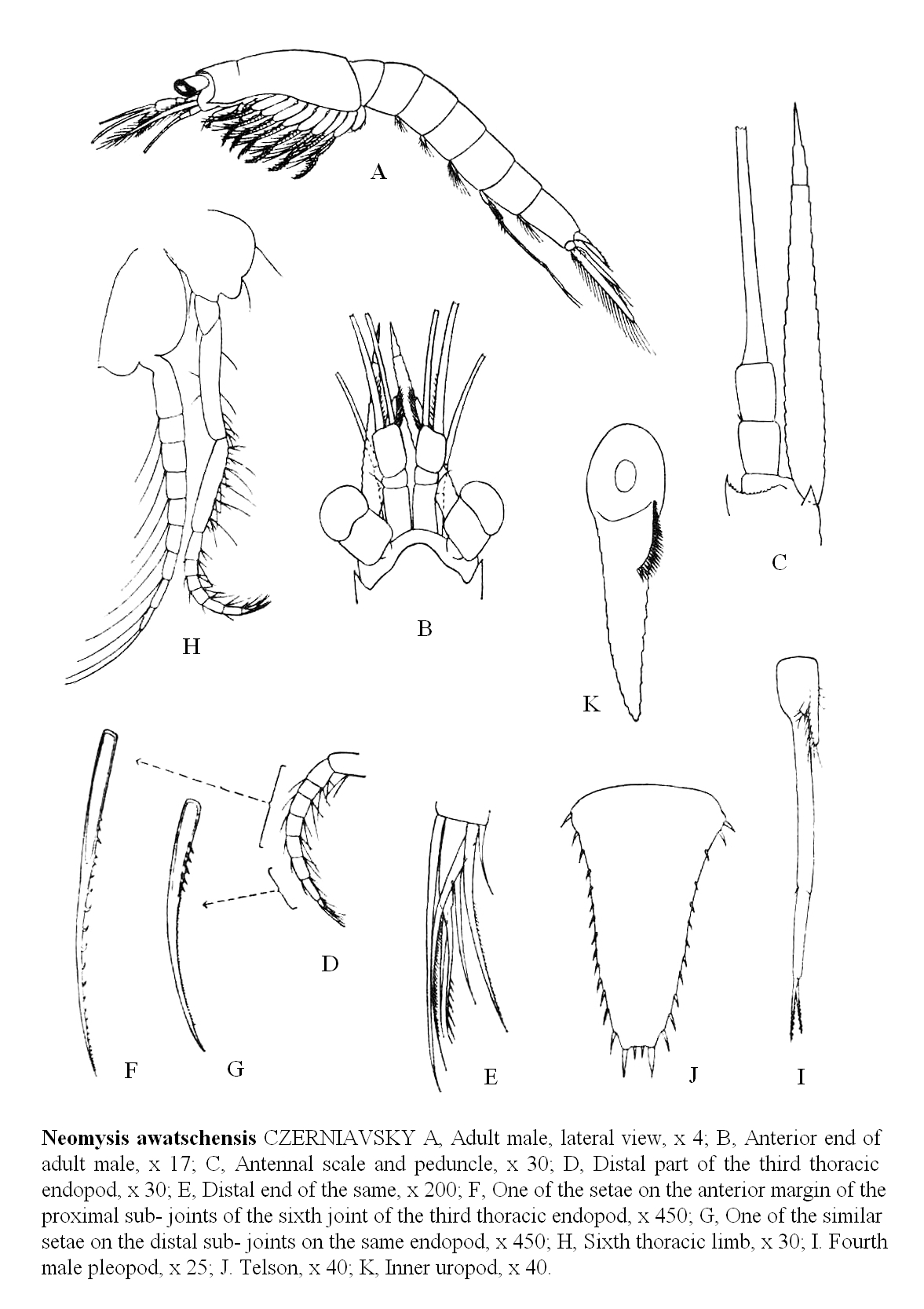

Scientific classification
- Kingdom: Animalia
- Phylum: Arthropoda
- Clade: Pancrustacea
- Class: Malacostraca
- Order: Mysida
- Family: Mysidae
- Genus: Neomysis
- Species: N. awatschensis

Binomial name
- Neomysis awatschensis (Brandt, 1851)

Synonyms
- Heteromysis intermedia Czerniavsky, 1882; Mysis awatschensis Brandt, 1851; Neomysis awatschenis (Brandt, 1851); Neomysis isaza

= Neomysis awatschensis =

Species of opossum shrimp

Neomysis awatschensis is a species of opossum shrimp in the family Mysidae found in coastal waters of the Pacific Ocean. It lives in estuarine and brackish waters as a secondary consumer and a food source for medium-sized fish. It is highly sensitive to pollution and is an indicator of its environment's overall quality. Conservation of N. awatschensis can be done by reducing agricultural runoff and maintaining appropriate oxygen levels in water, preserving seagrass habitat, and reducing pollution from petroleum products, paints, and other chemicals used in aquatic industries.

== Physical description ==
The body of Neomysis awatschensis closely resembles that of other opossum shrimp, with characteristic paired antennae and marsupium pouches in females. Its maximum body length is approximately 13.8 mm in males and 18.1 mm in females, and juveniles are shorter than 6 mm. One distinguishing feature is a longer pleopod 4, an appendage on the abdomen used in swimming and reproduction. N. awatschensis have 5-7 thoracopods, longer exopods than endopods (two branches of an appendage), and a trapezoidal rostrum at its rear.

== Habitat ==
Neomysis awatschensis is most commonly found in estuaries and slightly brackish waters. It lives in the upper sublittoral zone from 0–15 m and can tolerate a wide range of salinities as a euryhaline species. It has also been found in freshwater environments such as Lake Kasumiguara after surviving its desalination. In terms of oxygen, it cannot survive at saturation levels below 13%. Like other mysids, N. awatschensis often lives in seagrass meadows that provide diverse sources of food. It can survive in temperatures from -1 °C to 26 °C but thrives in 15 °C-25 °C water.

== Geographic distribution ==
Neomysis awatschensis is native to coastal waters of the North Pacific Ocean, particularly along the coasts of China, Japan, and Korea. Its range extends from Honshu Island (Japan) in the south, to the Bering Sea and Chukchi Sea in the north. It has also been found off the coasts of the United States in the Puget Sound and Californian estuaries. It is considered alien to the Ob river, where it was successfully introduced to improve the food base for fish in the 20th century

== Ecology and life history ==
=== Diel migration ===
Neomysis awatschensis move upwards in the water column at night and remain at greater depths during the day to avoid exposure to light and exploit different food sources.

=== Growth and reproduction ===
Reproduction and brooding happens in warmer seasons, in the spring and summer months across its distribution. Along the Korean coast, N. awatschensis breed from April to September. In Tugursky Bay, the Amur River, Amur Estuary, and Avachinskaya Guba, the species breeds from July to mid-September. In the Chown River Estuary, the species breeds during August. Like the adults, most young are found in freshwater and brackish zones. It takes approximately 15–30 days for young to mature, depending on water temperature. There are two main generation types for N. awatschensis: overwintering individuals of larger sizes (carapace length >2 mm), and smaller individuals (carapace length <2 mm) that persist during warmer seasons. Females typically grow to a size between 6–10 mm, and females of larger sizes often produce larger broods. As an r-strategist, N. awatschensis produces large numbers of offspring with relatively low energetic investment in highly variable environmental conditions

=== Diet ===
Throughout the entirety of this species' life stages, the primary food source of N. awatschensis consists of benthic diatoms (i.e. Bacillaria paxillifer, Navicula spp). Other food resources for N. awatschensis include green algae, phytoplankton, zooplankton, and mesozooplankton (i.e. Nauplius larvae, copepods) which vary depending on their environment. Ultimately, N. awatschensis can opportunistically serve as a detritivore, herbivore, or carnivore depending on environmental conditions and food availability

Given the numerous species of Mysid shrimp present in the waterways throughout the distribution of N. awatschensis, interspecific and intraspecific competition for food and shelter are generally expected. However, research indicates that environmental conditions can mitigate the consequences of niche overlap amongst these species due to the abundant food resources and shelter, such as those within seagrass communities. Within seagrass communities, N. awatschensis also protects the biodiversity of the ecosystem by feeding upon epiphytes and encouraging less restricted growth of the seagrass.

=== Predation ===
As a secondary consumer in their aquatic food webs, N. awatschensis serves as a critical food source for many fish across their distribution, including:

- Striped bass (Morone saxatilis)
- Splittail (Pogonichthys macrolepidotus)
- Longfin smelt (Spirinchus thaleichthys)
- Delta smelt (Hypomesus transpacificus)
- Japanese/temperate sea bass (Lateolabrax japonicus)
- Flounder (Paralichthys olivaceus)

== Threats and endangerments ==
Neomysis awatschensis is widely recognized as a bioindicator species, its population health and behavior reflect the quality of its surrounding water. As it is sensitive to pollutants, low oxygen, salinity changes, and temperature stress, changes in its abundance or physiology can signal deteriorating estuarine conditions before larger animals are affected. In China, the species has been formally adopted as a standard test organism for marine toxicity studies due to its short life cycle, easy culture, and measurable stress responses to contaminants. Multiple studies found it to be highly responsive to hydrocarbons (phenanthrene), metals, microplastics, and antifouling agents, making it a reliable early-warning species for pollution in coastal systems. Its role near the base of the food web links plankton to fish, adding ecological importance: if the numbers drop, it indicates broader ecosystem imbalance and potential fisheries impact.

=== Threats from pollution ===
According to some studies, the species is highly sensitive to phenanthrene, a petroleum pollutant with mortality reported at amounts as low as 0.02 mg/L. Antifouling agents like dichlofluanid, copper pyrithione, and zinc pyrithione negatively affect the species by reducing its feeding, growth, and reproduction. When exposed to these chemicals for long periods, multiple generations of the species can experience harmful effects, including slower development and lower survival. Studies have also shown wastewater from ship hull cleaning, which contains metals like copper and zinc along with toxic biocides, to be highly dangerous to the species

=== Habitat alteration ===
Studies done in Sacramento-San Joaquin Estuary show that water diversion and flow reduction disturb salinity/oxygen balance, thereby reducing the numbers. Invasive species have also contributed to reduction in the related mysid populations through food-web competition

== Conservation efforts ==
To protect Neomysis awatschensis, it's important to keep oxygen levels in estuaries above 6–8 mg/L and control nutrient pollution to stop low-oxygen (hypoxic) conditions that can kill them. Pollution from oil and petroleum products also needs to be limited; phenanthrene levels should stay below 3.32 μg/L to keep estuarine ecosystems safe.

Ship hull-cleaning wastewater contains metals and toxic antifouling chemicals that remain harmful even after filtration. Stronger rules and better cleaning systems are needed to reduce these pollutants before they enter the water Waste from aquaculture, such as spoiled feed that releases histamine, can also lower mysid survival and reproduction, so fish farms should handle waste carefully and avoid feeding old fish products.

Microplastics and agricultural runoff bring additional risks by adding toxins that build up in mysids' bodies. Research suggests limiting plastic waste and runoff can help reduce this contamination. Finally, conserving seagrass beds and maintaining steady freshwater flow are essential because these areas provide shelter and food for mysids and support their breeding and feeding activities.
