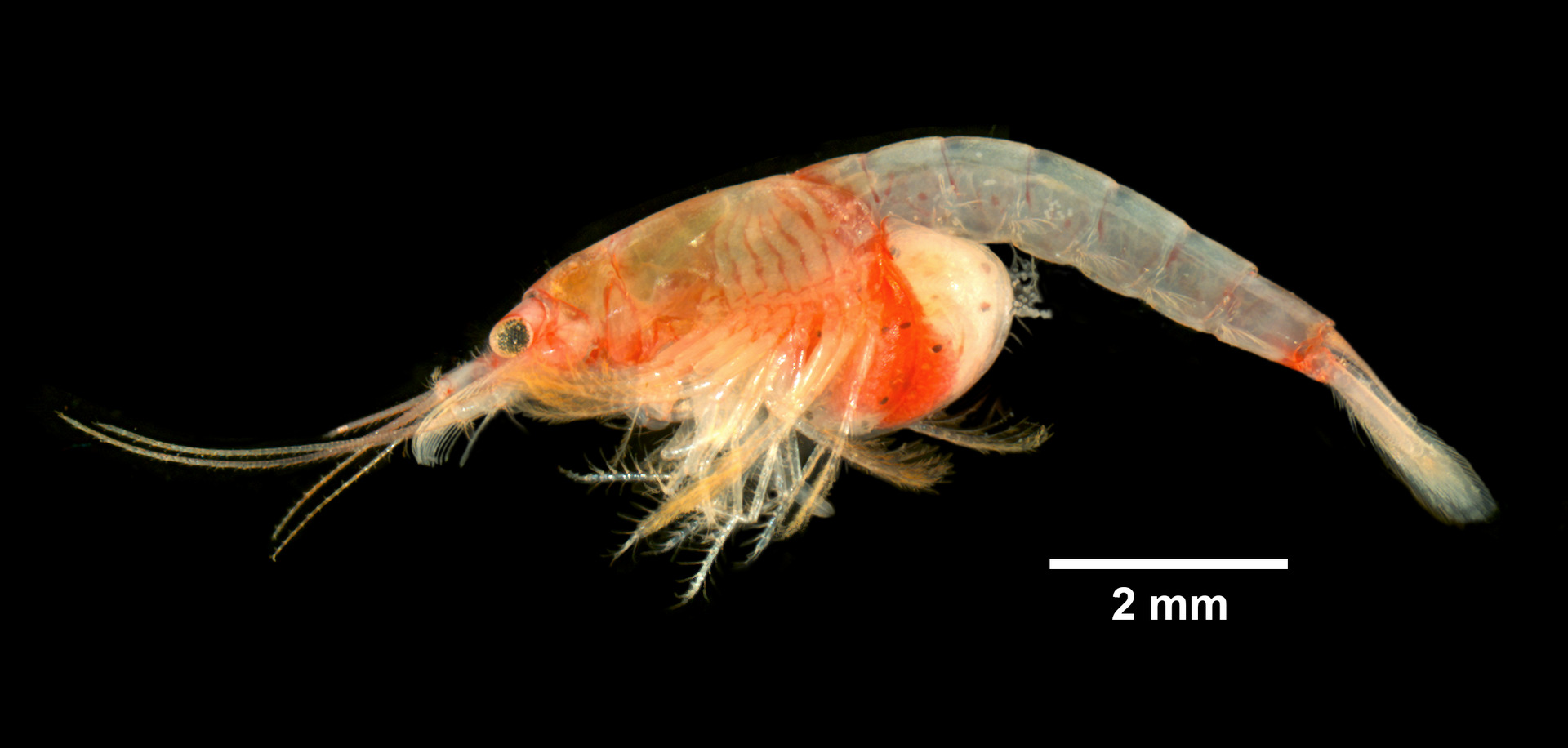
- Heteromysis formosa

Scientific classification
- Domain: Eukaryota
- Kingdom: Animalia
- Phylum: Arthropoda
- Class: Malacostraca
- Order: Mysida
- Family: Mysidae
- Subfamily: Heteromysinae; Norman, 1892

= Heteromysinae =

Subfamily of crustaceans

Heteromysinae is a subfamily of predominantly marine mysid crustaceans from the family Mysidae. The name comes from the genus Heteromysis and describes differentiation of the pereiopods (thoracic appendages) in the type genus. However, not all members of the subfamily share this feature. Heteromysines are distributed globally and include about 150 species, divided between three tribes: Heteromysini, Harmelinellini and Mysidetini.
