= Mysis salemaai =

Scientific classification
- Domain: Eukaryota
- Kingdom: Animalia
- Phylum: Arthropoda
- Class: Malacostraca
- Order: Mysida
- Family: Mysidae
- Genus: Mysis
- Species: M. salemaai

Binomial name
- Mysis salemaai Audzijonytė & Väinölä, 2005

Species of crustacean

Mysis salemaai is a shrimp-like crustacean in the Mysida order, inhabiting lakes of Ireland and South Scandinavia and brackish waters of the northern Baltic Sea.

== Appearance ==
Mysis salemaai is a transparent shrimp-like crustacean, of less than 2.5 centimetres (0.98 in) length. It has two pairs of relatively long antennae, associated with rounded antennal plates; large, stalked compound eyes; the thorax covered by a coat-like carapace; a muscular, cylindrical abdomen; and a tail fan featuring a telson with a V-shaped terminal cleft. Reproducing females bear a prominent brood pouch (marsupium) between their legs. Mysis are often called opossum shrimp.

== Distribution ==
Mysis salemaai is a North European species which lives both in fresh and brackish waters. It is found in ten lakes on the island of Ireland, including Lough Neagh, Lough Erne, Lough Corrib and Lough Ree. It is also found in several lakes of Southern Scandinavia, including Fureso in Denmark and the large lakes Vänern and Vättern in Sweden, and also in the Republic of Karelia. Mysis salemaai is also common in the Baltic Sea, where it lives in offshore waters of the diluted northern parts of the basin.

Previously M. salemaai was confused with Mysis relicta, which is a morphologically similar sibling species. The distributions of the two species overlap in the Baltic Sea and some lakes of Sweden, but M. relicta is not found in Ireland.

== Habitat ==
M. salemaai is a benthopelagic species, which in the nighttime performs vertical migration towards the surface.
