= Food chain =

Aspect of ecosystems

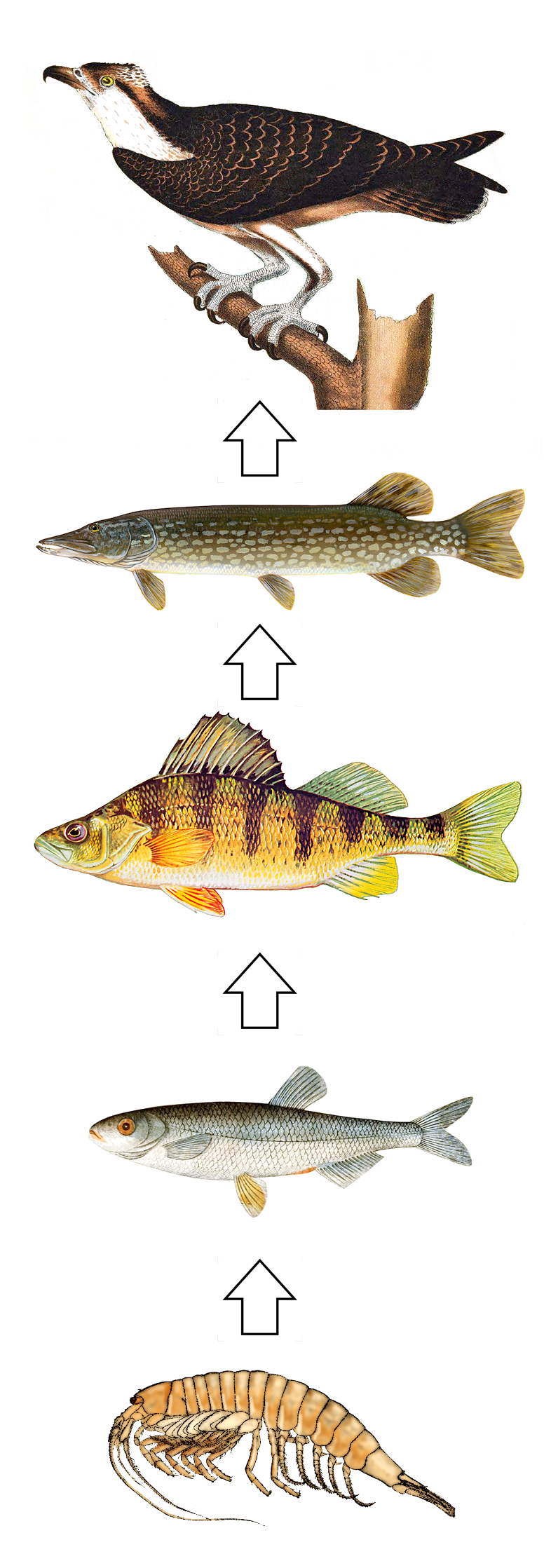
Food chain in a Swedish lake. Osprey feed on northern pike, which in turn feed on perch which eat bleak which eat crustaceans.

A food chain is a linear network of links in a food web, often beginning with an autotroph (such as grass or algae), also called a producer, and typically ending at an apex predator (such as grizzly bears or killer whales), detritivore (such as earthworms and woodlice), or decomposer (such as fungi or bacteria). A food web is distinct from a food chain. A food chain illustrates the associations between organisms according to the energy sources they consume in trophic levels, and the most common way to quantify them is in length: the number of links between a trophic consumer and the base of the chain.

Studies of food chains are essential to many biological studies.

Stability of the food chain is crucial for survival of most species. Removing even one component from the food chain could result in extinction or significant decreases in a species' probability of surviving. Many food chains and food webs contain a keystone species, a species that could directly affect the food chain and has a significant impact on the environment. The absence of a keystone species could destroy the balance of the entire food chain.

The efficiency of a food chain depends on the energy first consumed by the primary producers. This energy then moves through the trophic levels.

== History ==
Food chains were first discussed by al-Jahiz, a 10th century Arab philosopher. The modern concepts of food chains and food webs were introduced by Charles Elton.

== Food chain versus food web ==
A food chain differs from a food web as a food chain follows a direct linear pathway of consumption and energy transfer. Natural interconnections between food chains make a food web, which are non-linear and depict interconnecting pathways of what is this and energy transfer.

== Trophic levels ==
Food chain models typically predict that communities are controlled by predators at the top and plants (autotrophs or producers) at the bottom.

Trophic pyramids (also called ecological pyramids) model trophic levels in a food chain and/or biomass productivity.

Thus, the foundation of the food chain typically consists of primary producers. Primary producers, or autotrophs, utilize energy derived from either sunlight or inorganic chemical compounds to create complex organic compounds, such as starch, for energy. Because the sun's light is necessary for photosynthesis, most life could not exist if the sun disappeared. Even so, it has recently been discovered that there are some forms of life, chemotrophs, that appear to gain all their metabolic energy from chemosynthesis driven by hydrothermal vents, thus showing that some life may not require solar energy to thrive. Chemosynthetic bacteria and archaea use hydrogen sulfide and methane from hydrothermal vents and cold seeps as an energy source (just as plants use sunlight) to produce carbohydrates; they form the base of the food chain in regions with little to no sunlight. Regardless of where the energy is obtained, a species that produces its own energy lies at the base of the food chain model, and is a critically important part of an ecosystem.

Higher trophic levels cannot produce their own energy and so must consume producers or other life that itself consumes producers. In the higher trophic levels lies consumers (secondary consumers, tertiary consumers, etc.). Consumers are organisms that eat other organisms. All organisms in a food chain, except the first organism, are consumers. Secondary consumers eat and obtain energy from primary consumers, tertiary consumers eat and obtain energy from secondary consumers, etc.

At the highest trophic level is typically an apex predator, a consumer with no natural predators in the food chain model.

When any trophic level dies, detritivores and decomposers consume their organic material for energy and expel nutrients into the environment in their waste. Decomposers and detritivores break down the organic compounds into simple nutrients that are returned to the soil. These are the simple nutrients that plants require to create organic compounds. It is estimated that there are more than 100,000 different decomposers in existence.

Models of trophic levels also often model energy transfer between trophic levels. Primary consumers get energy from the producer and pass it to the secondary and tertiary consumers.

== Studies ==
Food chains are vital in ecotoxicology studies, which trace the pathways and biomagnification of environmental contaminants. It is also necessary to consider interactions amongst different trophic levels to predict community dynamics; food chains are often the base level for theory development of trophic levels and community/ecosystem investigations.

== Length ==
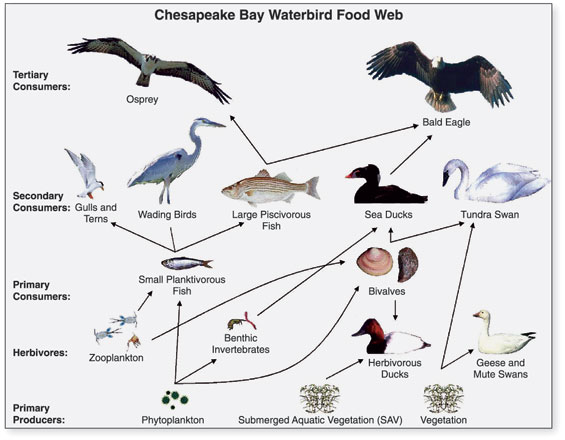
This food web of waterbirds from Chesapeake Bay is a network of food chains

The length of a food chain is a continuous variable providing a measure of the passage of energy and an index of ecological structure that increases through the linkages from the lowest to the highest trophic (feeding) levels.

Food chains are directional paths of trophic energy or, equivalently, sequences of links that start with basal species, such as producers or fine organic matter, and end with consumer organisms.

Food chains are often used in ecological modeling (such as a three-species food chain). They are simplified abstractions of real food webs, but complex in their dynamics and mathematical implications.

In its simplest form, the length of a chain is the number of links between a trophic consumer and the base of the web. The mean chain length of an entire web is the arithmetic average of the lengths of all chains in the food web. The food chain is an energy source diagram. The food chain begins with a producer, which is eaten by a primary consumer. The primary consumer may be eaten by a secondary consumer, which in turn may be consumed by a tertiary consumer. The tertiary consumers may sometimes become prey to the top predators known as the quaternary consumers. For example, a food chain might start with a green plant as the producer, which is eaten by a snail, the primary consumer. The snail might then be the prey of a secondary consumer such as a frog, which itself may be eaten by a tertiary consumer such as a snake which in turn may be consumed by an eagle. This simple view of a food chain with fixed trophic levels within a species: species A is eaten by species B, B is eaten by C, ... is often contrasted by the real situation in which the juveniles of a species belong to a lower trophic level than the adults, a situation more often seen in aquatic and amphibious environments, e.g., in insects and fishes. This complexity was denominated metaphoetesis by G. E. Hutchinson, 1959.

Ecologists have formulated and tested hypotheses regarding the nature of ecological patterns associated with food chain length, such as length increasing with ecosystem volume, limited by the reduction of energy at each successive level, or reflecting habitat type.

Food chain length is important because the amount of energy transferred decreases as trophic level increases; generally only ten percent of the total energy at one trophic level is passed to the next, as the remainder is used in the metabolic process. There are usually no more than five tropic levels in a food chain. Humans are able to receive more energy by going back a level in the chain and consuming the food before, for example getting more energy per pound from consuming a salad than an animal which ate lettuce.

== Keystone species ==
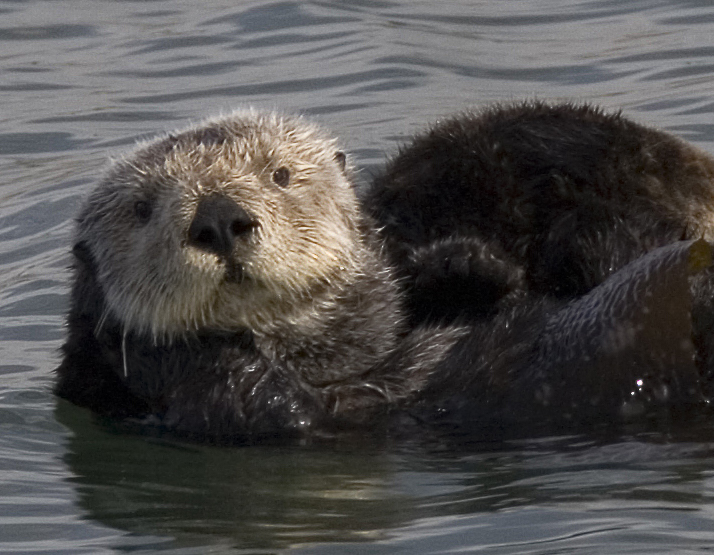
The sea otter is a prime example of a keystone species

A keystone species is a singular species within an ecosystem that others within the same ecosystem, or the entire ecosystem itself, rely upon. Keystone species' are so vital for an ecosystem that without their presence, an ecosystem could transform or stop existing entirely. One way keystone species impact an ecosystem is through their presence in an ecosystem's food web and, by extension, a food chain within said ecosystem. Sea otters, a keystone species in Pacific coastal regions, prey on sea urchins. Without the presence of sea otters, sea urchins practice destructive grazing on kelp populations which contributes to declines in coastal ecosystems within the northern pacific regions. The presence of sea otters controls sea urchin populations and helps maintain kelp forests, which are vital for other species within the ecosystem.

== See also ==
- Heterotroph
- Lithotroph
- Ecological pyramid
- Predator-prey interaction
