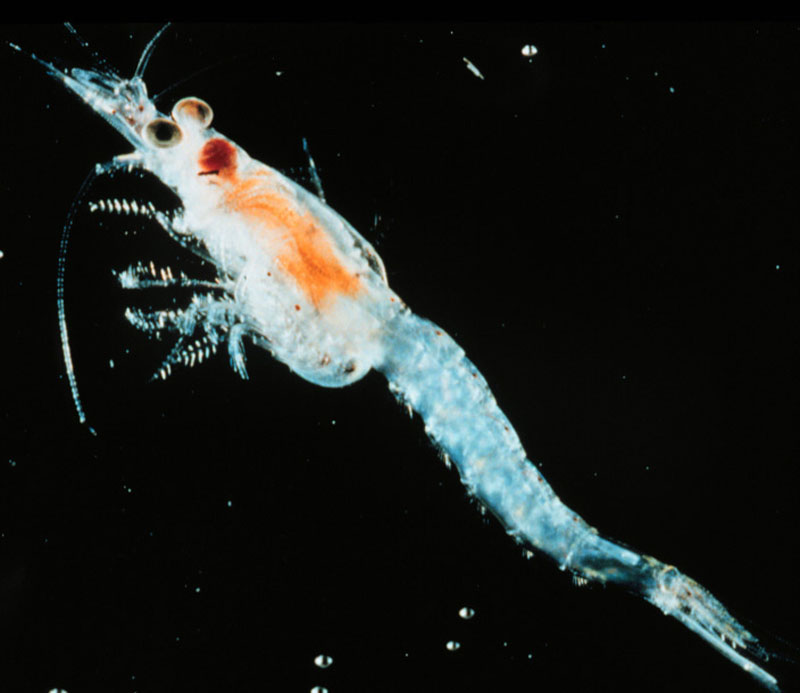
- Mysis diluviana

Scientific classification
- Kingdom: Animalia
- Phylum: Arthropoda
- Class: Malacostraca
- Order: Mysida
- Family: Mysidae
- Subfamily: Mysinae
- Genus: Mysis; Latreille, 1802

= Mysis =

Genus of crustaceans

Mysis is a genus of mysid crustaceans in the family Mysidae, distributed mainly in the coastal zone of the Arctic and high boreal seas. Several species also inhabit northern freshwater lakes and the brackish Caspian Sea. Fifteen species are recognized. Body lengths range from 1 to 3 centimetres (0.4 to 1.2 in).

The freshwater taxa of the genus have been referred to as "glacial relicts", and they comprise four closely related species, most of which also live in brackish water. Mysis relicta is a freshwater species from boreal lakes of Northern Europe, also present in the Baltic Sea. Mysis salemaai is another North European and Baltic Sea taxon. Mysis segerstralei is a fresh- and brackish-water species of the Eurasian and North American Arctic and sub-Arctic. The North American lakes, including the Great Lakes, are inhabited by Mysis diluviana. Various species of Mysis are found in lakes of the South Swedish highlands, like Lake Sommen, that were never connected to the sea or the Baltic Ice Lake. This has led to theories that claim a natural lock system existed in the area during the Younger Dryas.

Four endemic species inhabit the Caspian Sea. They have specialized and adapted to the cold, deepwater habitats of the landlocked basin. For example, the bathyal M. amblyops, the smallest mysid in the genus, has reduced eyes. Four species also have circum-arctic distributions (M. oculata, M. nordenskioldi, M. segerstralei, M. polaris).

Generic characters: frontal margin of carapace convex, angular; antennal scale with setae around all margins, segment 2 of maxilla 2 palp large, axe-shaped, with strong serrated spine-setae; pereiopods long, carpopropodus 7–9-segmented; male pleopod 4 5-segmented, segment 4 as long as segment 3; telson with cleft.

== Species ==
- Mysis amblyops G. O. Sars, 1907
- Mysis caspia G. O. Sars, 1895
- Mysis diluviana Audzijonytė & Väinölä, 2005
- Mysis gaspensis O. Tattersall, 1954
- Mysis litoralis (Banner, 1948)
- Mysis macrolepis G. O. Sars, 1907
- Mysis microphthalma G. O. Sars, 1895
- Mysis mixta Lilljeborg, 1853
- Mysis nordenskioldi Audzijonytė & Väinölä, 2007
- Mysis oculata (Fabricius, 1780)
- Mysis polaris Holmquist, 1959
- Mysis relicta Lovén, 1862
- Mysis salemaai Audzijonytė & Väinölä, 2005
- Mysis segerstralei Audzijonytė & Väinölä, 2005
- Mysis stenolepis Smith, 1873
