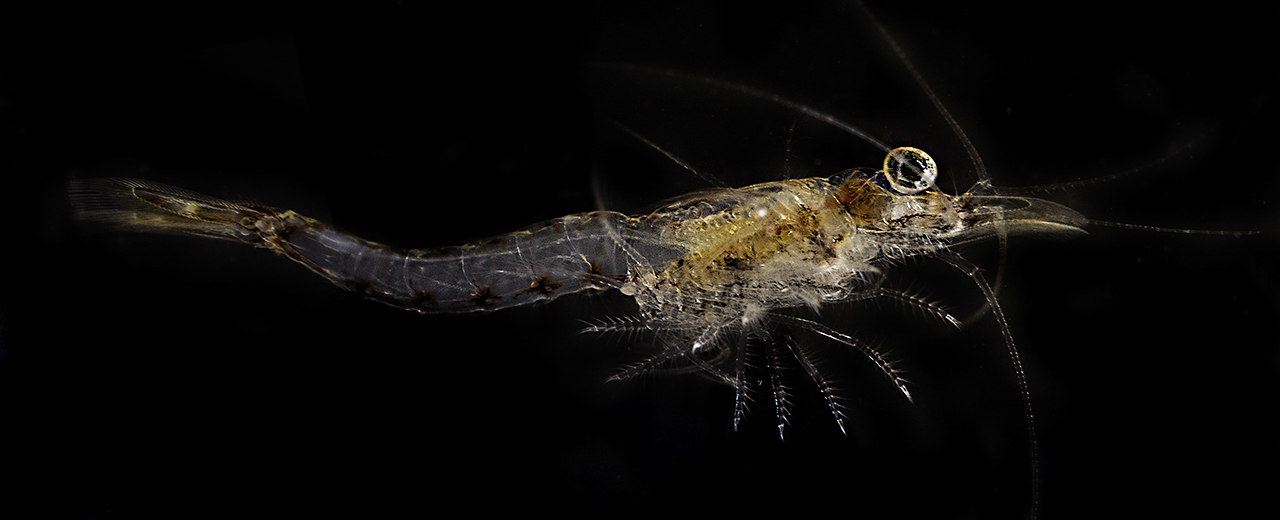

Scientific classification
- Kingdom: Animalia
- Phylum: Arthropoda
- Clade: Pancrustacea
- Class: Malacostraca
- Order: Mysida
- Family: Mysidae
- Genus: Mysis
- Species: M. relicta

Binomial name
- Mysis relicta Lovén, 1862

= Mysis relicta =

Species of crustacean

Mysis relicta is a shrimp-like crustacean in the Mysida order, native to lakes of Northern Europe and to the brackish Baltic Sea.

== Appearance ==
Mysis is a small, transparent shrimp-like crustacean, of less than 2.5 cm length. It has two pairs of relatively long antennae, associated with rounded antennal plates; large, stalked compound eyes; the thorax covered by a coat-like carapace; a muscular, cylindrical abdomen; and a tail fan featuring a telson with a v-shaped terminal cleft.

Reproducing females bear a prominent brood pouch (marsupium) between their thoracal legs. The pleopods (abdominal legs) of Mysis are reduced, except for a specialized pair of mating legs in males.

== Distribution ==
The distribution of Mysis relicta is restricted to previously glaciated regions in Northern Europe, including northwest Russia, Finland, Sweden, southeast Norway, and parts of Germany, Poland, and Lithuania.

Previously M. relicta was treated as a circumpolar taxon also present in North America and the Eurasian Arctic. A revision in 2005 divided these circumpolar freshwater Mysis populations into four distinct species. Apart from the North European M. relicta, these include Mysis diluviana in lakes of the United States and Canada, Mysis segerstralei in the circumpolar Arctic, and Mysis salemaai in some European lakes and the Baltic.

== Habitat ==
The species is found in relatively deep, cold, and often oligotrophic lakes with sufficient dissolved oxygen, where it stays mainly below the thermocline. M. relicta is a benthopelagic species, which in the nighttime performs vertical migration towards the surface. In the Baltic Sea, M. relicta is only found in the most diluted marginal parts of the basin, where it also stays in deeper water. In the open sea it is replaced by M. salemaai. Like other crustaceans, their populations can be extirpated by lake acidification.

== Food ==
M. relicta is an opportunistic feeder with both predatorial and filter feeding habits. When zooplankton are abundant, they serve as the primary food source; when scarce, M. relicta will feed on phytoplankton, suspended organic detritus or from the surface of benthic organic deposits.

M. relicta are also an important source of food for freshwater fish including brook trout, lake trout, burbot, and coregonids. As such, they are a keystone species. A current active area of research is the effect of mysid reintroduction on lake food webs after acidification.
