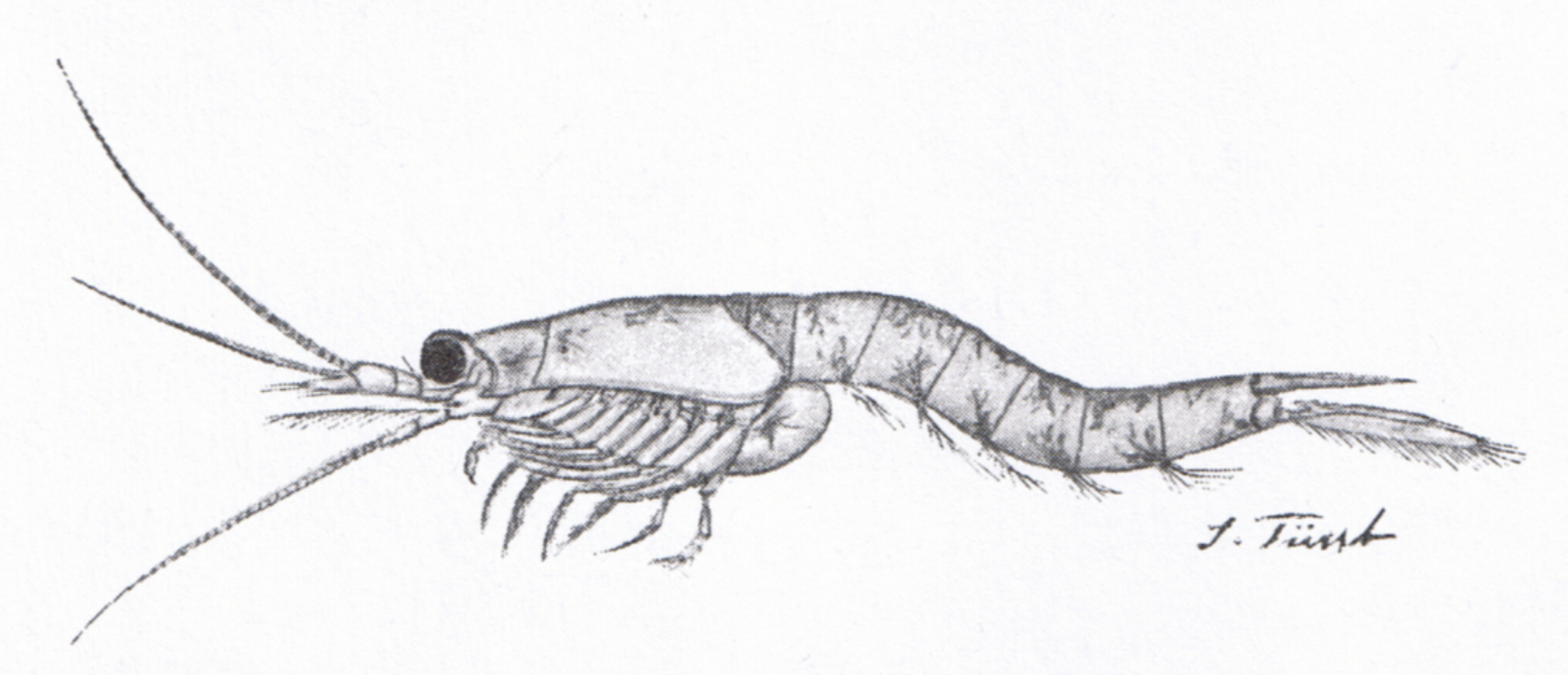

Scientific classification
- Domain: Eukaryota
- Kingdom: Animalia
- Phylum: Arthropoda
- Class: Malacostraca
- Order: Mysida
- Family: Mysidae
- Genus: Neomysis
- Species: N. integer

Binomial name
- Neomysis integer (Leach, 1814)

Synonyms
- Mysis integer (Leach, 1814); Mysis scoticus J.V. Thompson, 1828; Mysis vulgaris J.V. Thompson, 1828; Neomysis vulgaris (J.V. Thompson, 1828); Praunus integer Leach, 1814

= Neomysis integer =

Species of crustacean

Neomysis integer is a species of opossum shrimp found in shallow marine bays and estuaries of Europe, with a transparent greenish or brownish body and a large cephalothorax. It is found in very shallow water in both high and low-salinity habitats. It is a filter feeder and the female broods her eggs in a brood pouch beneath her cephalothorax.

== Description ==
Neomysis integer is a slender opossum shrimp growing to a maximum length of about 17 mm (0.7 in). The head has a pair of large, stalked eyes and two pairs of antennae, both of which are biramous (branched into two parts). The exopod (the outermost branch) of the second antenna forms an elongated scale with bristles round its edges and extends forward into a sharp point. The thorax has eight segments each bearing a pair of biramous limbs, the outer branches of which have a feathery appearance. The head and first six segments of the thorax are covered by a protective carapace which extends forward in a triangular plate with a depressed centre between the eyes. The abdomen bears short limbs and the last segment bears larger, flattened biramous limbs which form a tail fan. The telson (the last abdominal segment between the tail fan) is not forked, a fact emphasised by the specific name "integer". This opossum shrimp is semi-transparent, sometimes with a brownish tinge.

== Distribution and habitat ==
Neomysis integer is native to the northeastern Atlantic Ocean, its range extending from the Baltic Sea and North Sea to the Mediterranean. It is found just above the seabed in very shallow waters in coastal and estuarine habitats at a wide range of salinities and is able to adapt to changing salinity levels. It is not common in the open sea but is more often observed in high salinity pools on the foreshore and in non-tidal lagoons. It is often the commonest mysid shrimp in the low-salinity upper parts of estuaries. It is also present in lakes in Frisia that were originally linked to the sea but became isolated when the Afsluitdijk causeway was constructed in 1933. Over the succeeding years, the sea water gradually turned to freshwater and Neomysis integer was the only opossum shrimp that survived.

== Biology ==
These opossum shrimps are frequently found in large numbers and filter small food particles out of the water, occasionally consuming larger prey. The diet consists largely of detritus, but water fleas and copepods are also consumed. Opossum shrimps themselves often fall prey to fish. In the Frisian Lakes these include the European perch (Perca fluviatilis), the European smelt (Osmerus eperlanus), the ruffe (Gymnocephalus cernua), young pike-perch (Sander lucioperca) and sometimes the European eel (Anguilla anguilla). The females have a brood pouch under their thorax in which eggs and young develop.
