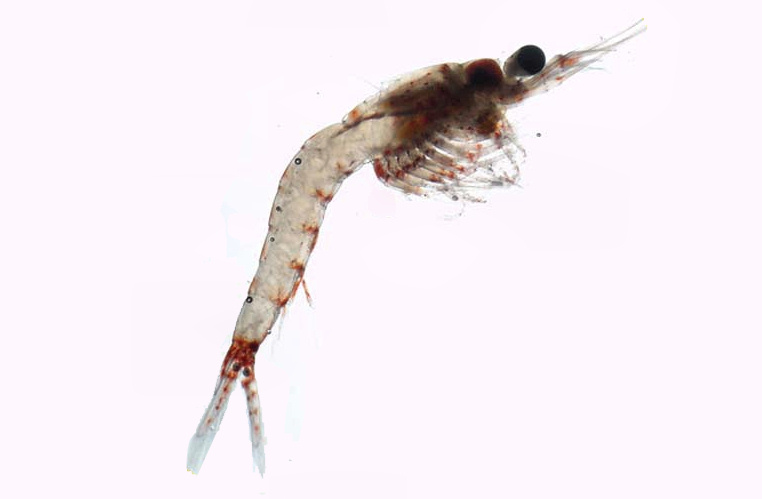
- Hemimysis anomala (Mysidae)

Scientific classification
- Kingdom: Animalia
- Phylum: Arthropoda
- Clade: Pancrustacea
- Class: Malacostraca
- Superorder: Peracarida
- Order: Mysida; Boas, 1883

Families
- Mysidae; Petalophthalmidae

= Mysida =

Small, shrimp-like crustacean

Mysida is an order of small, shrimp-like crustaceans in the malacostracan superorder Peracarida. Their common name opossum shrimps stems from the presence of a brood pouch or "marsupium" in females. The fact that the larvae are reared in this pouch and are not free-swimming characterises the order. The mysid's head bears a pair of stalked eyes and two pairs of antennae. The thorax consists of eight segments each bearing branching limbs, the whole concealed beneath a protective carapace and the abdomen has six segments and usually further small limbs.

Mysids are found throughout the world in both shallow and deep marine waters where they can be benthic or pelagic, but they are also important in some fresh water and brackish ecosystems. Many benthic species make daily vertical migrations into higher parts of the water column. Mysids are filter feeders, omnivores that feed on algae, detritus and zooplankton. Some mysids are cultured in laboratories for experimental purposes and are used as a food source for other cultured marine organisms. They are sensitive to water pollution, so are sometimes used as bioindicators to monitor water quality.

== Description ==
The head of a mysid bears two pairs of antennae and a pair of large, stalked eyes. The head and first segment (or sometimes the first three segments) of the thorax are fused to form the cephalothorax. The eight thoracic segments are covered by the carapace which is attached only to the first three. The first two thoracic segments bear maxillipeds which are used to filter plankton and organic particulate from the water. The other six pairs of thoracic appendages are biramous (branching) limbs known as pereopods, and are used for swimming, as well as for wafting water towards the maxillipeds for feeding. Unlike true shrimps (Caridea), females have a marsupium beneath the thorax. This brood pouch is enclosed by the large, flexible oostegites, bristly flaps which extend from the basal segments of the pereopods and which form the floor of a chamber roofed by the animal's sternum. This chamber is where the eggs are brooded, development being direct in most cases.

The abdomen has six segments, the first five of which bear pleopods, although these may be absent or vestigial in females. The fourth pleopod is longer than the others in males and has a specialized reproductory function.

The majority of species are 5–25 mm (0.2–1.0 in) long, and vary in colour from pale and transparent, through to bright orange or brown. They differ from other species within the superorder Peracarida by featuring statocysts on their uropods (located on the last abdominal segment). These help the animal orient itself in the water and are clearly seen as circular vesicles: together with the pouch the statocysts are often used as features that distinguish mysids from other shrimp-like organisms.

== Distribution ==
Mysids have a cosmopolitan distribution and are found in both marine and freshwater environments, the deep sea, estuaries, shallow coastal waters, lakes, rivers and underground waters. They are primarily marine and fewer than ten percent are found in freshwater. There are about 72 freshwater species in total, being predominantly found in the Palearctic and Neotropical realms. These non-marine mysids occur in four distinct types of habitats; some are estuarine species; some were isolated in the Ponto-Caspian Basin where Paramysis has since radiated enormously (23 species); some are glacial relicts and some are subterranean Tethyan relicts.

== Behavior ==
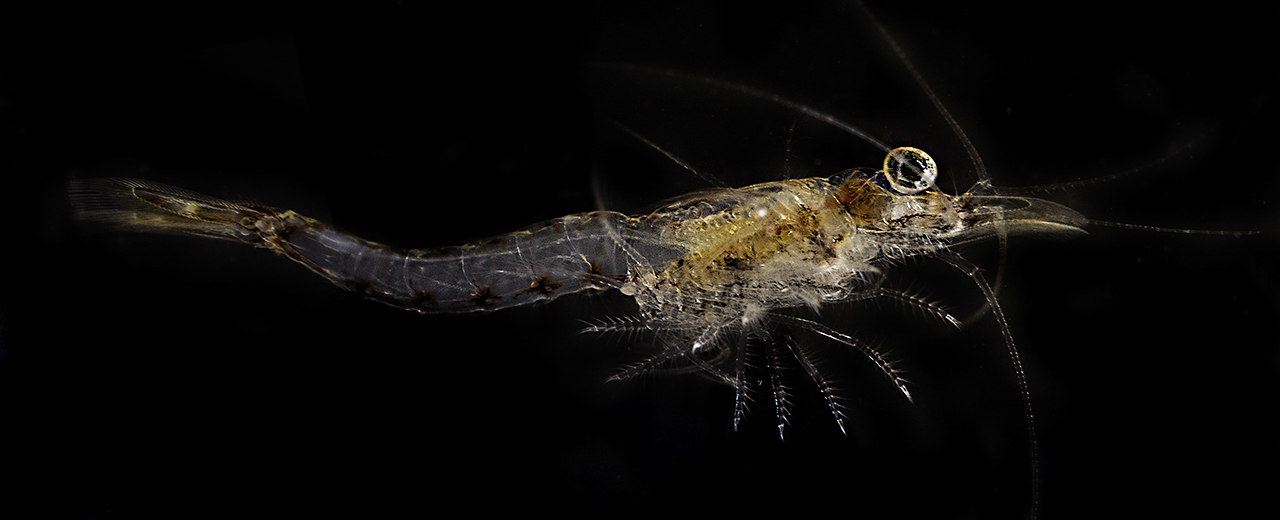
Mysis relicta

Some species are benthic (living on the seabed) and others pelagic (living in mid-water), but most are found close to, crawling on or burrowing into the mud or sand. Most marine species are benthic by day but leave the seabed at night to become planktonic. Locomotion is mostly by swimming, the pleopods being used for this purpose. Some mysids live among algae and seagrasses, some are solitary while many form dense swarms. Mysids form an important part of the diet of such fish as shad and flounder. In general, they are free-living, but a few species, mostly in the subfamily Heteromysinae, are commensal and are associated with sea anemones and hermit crabs. Several taxa have also been described from different freshwater habitats and caves. Mysis relicta and its close relatives inhabit cold, deep lakes and have a diurnal cycle of vertical migrations. The species Mysidium integrum has a mutualistic relationship with longfin damselfish, the shrimp providing nutrients for the algae farms the fish feed on and the fish providing protection from predators.

The majority of Mysida are omnivores, feeding on algae, detritus, and zooplankton. Scavenging and cannibalism are also common, with the adults sometimes preying on their young once they emerge from the marsupium. The pelagic and most other species are filter feeders, creating a feeding current with the exopods of their pereopods. This wafts food particles into a ventral food groove along which they are passed before being filtered by setae (bristles) on the second maxillae. Larger planktonic prey can be caught in a trap composed of the endopods of the thoracic appendages. Some benthic species, especially members of the subfamily Erythropinae, have been observed feeding on small particles which they collected by grooming the surfaces of their bodies and legs.

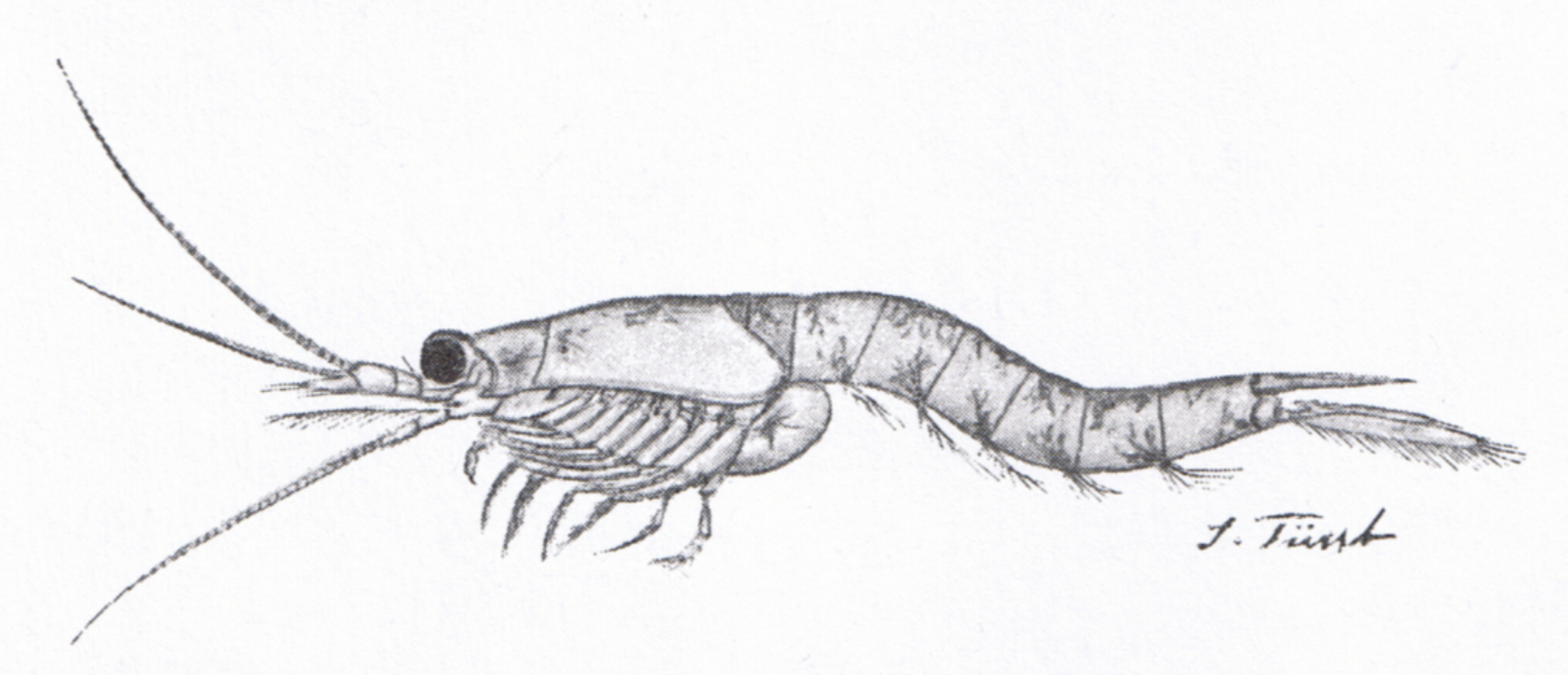
Neomysis integer

Individual mysids are either male or female, and fertilisation is external. The gonads are in the thorax and are tubular in shape. Males have two gonopores in the eighth thoracic segment and a pair of long penises. The female gonopores are in the sixth thoracic segment and the oostegites are attached to the first to seventh pereopods to form a brood pouch. Mating usually takes place at night and lasts only a few minutes. During the process, the male inserts his penises into the marsupium and releases sperm. This stimulates the female and the eggs are usually released into the marsupium within an hour. Here they are fertilised and retained, development of the embryos in the brood pouch being direct with the young hatching from the eggs as miniature adults. The size of a mysid brood generally correlates with body length and environmental factors such as density and food availability. The age at which mysids reach sexual maturity depends on water temperature and food availability. For the species Mysidopsis bahia, this is normally at 12 to 20 days. The young are released soon afterwards, and although their numbers are usually low, the short reproductive cycle of mysid adults means a new brood can be produced every four to seven days.

== Uses ==
Some species of mysids are easy to culture on a large scale in the laboratory as they are highly adaptive, and can tolerate a wide range of conditions. Despite low fecundity, these species have a short reproductive cycle which means they can quickly reproduce in vast numbers. They can be cultured in static or flow-through systems, the latter having been shown to be able to maintain a higher stocking density than a static system. In flow-through systems, juvenile mysids are continuously separated from the adult brood stock in order to reduce mortality due to cannibalism. Artemia (brine shrimp) juveniles (incubated for 24 hours) are the most common food in mysid cultures, sometimes enriched with highly unsaturated fatty acids to increase their nutritional value.

Cultured mysids are thought to provide an ideal food source for many marine organisms. They are often fed to cephalopods, fish larvae, and commercial farmed shrimp due to their small size and low cost. Their high protein and fat content also makes them a good alternative to live enriched Artemia when feeding juveniles (especially those that are difficult to maintain such as young seahorses) and other small fauna.

Their sensitivity to water quality also makes them suitable for bioassays. Americamysis bahia and Americamysis almyra are frequently used to test for pesticides and other toxic substances, with A. bahia found to be more sensitive during the periods when it is moulting.

== Systematics ==
The Mysida belong to the superorder Peracarida, which means "near to shrimps". Although in many respects mysids appear similar to some shrimps, the main characteristic separating them from the superorder Eucarida is their lack of free-swimming larvae. The order Mysida is extensive and currently includes approximately 160 genera, containing more than 1000 species.

Traditionally, Mysida were united with another, externally similar group of pelagic crustaceans, the Lophogastrida, into a broader order Mysidacea, but that classification is generally abandoned at present. While the previous grouping had good morphological support, molecular studies do not corroborate the monophyly of this group. Previously Mysida included two other families, Lepidomysidae and Stygiomysidae, but these have now been placed in a separate order, Stygiomysida.

== Classification ==
- Family Mysidae Haworth, 1825
  - Subfamily Boreomysinae Holt & Tattersall, 1905
    - 2 genera
  - Subfamily Erythropinae Hansen, 1910
    - 54 genera
  - Subfamily Gastrosaccinae Norman, 1892
    - 10 genera
  - Subfamily Heteromysinae Norman, 1892
    - 14 genera
  - Subfamily Leptomysinae Hansen, 1910
    - 30 genera
  - Subfamily Mysidellinae Czerniavsky, 1882
    - 2 genera
  - Subfamily Mysinae Haworth, 1825
    - 55 genera
  - Subfamily Palaumysinae Wittmann, 2013
    - 1 genus
  - Subfamily Rhopalophthalminae Hansen, 1910
    - 1 genus
  - Subfamily Siriellinae Norman, 1892
    - 3 genera
- Family Petalophthalmidae Czerniavsky, 1882
  - Genus Bacescomysis Murano & Krygier, 1985
  - Genus Ceratomysis Faxon, 1893
  - Genus Hansenomysis Stebbing, 1893
  - Genus Parapetalophthalmus Murano & Bravo, 1998
  - Genus Petalophthalmus Willemoes-Suhm, 1875
  - Genus Pseudopetalophthalmus Bravo & Murano, 1997

== See also ==
- Non-human agriculture
