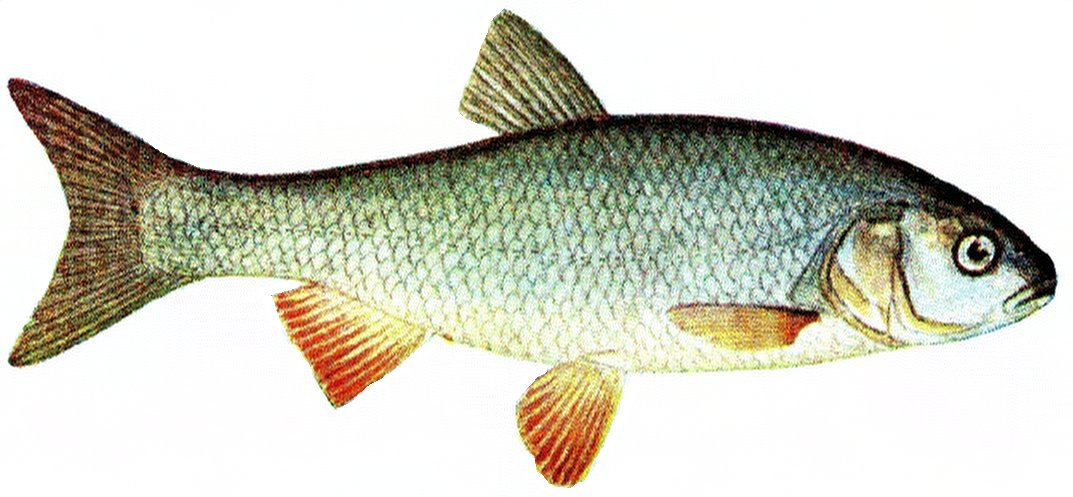
- Ide, Leuciscus idus

Scientific classification
- Kingdom: Animalia
- Phylum: Chordata
- Class: Actinopterygii
- Order: Cypriniformes
- Family: Leuciscidae
- Subfamily: Leuciscinae
- Genus: Leuciscus; Cuvier, 1816

Type species
- Cyprinus leusciscus Linnaeus, 1758

Species
- See text

Synonyms
- Aspiopsis Zugmayer, 1912; Leuciscus Cuvier, 1816; Bathystoma Fitzinger, 1873; Dobula Rafinesque, 1820; Genghis Howes, 1984; Idus Heckel, 1843

= Leuciscus =

Genus of fishes

Leuciscus is a genus of freshwater and brackish water ray-finned fishes belonging to the family Leuciscidae, which includes the daces, Eurasian minnows and related species. They are inland water fishes commonly called Eurasian daces. The genus is widespread from Europe to Siberia. Species broadly distributed in Europe include the common dace Leuciscus leuciscus and the ide L. idus.

The European chubs were formerly also included in Leuciscus, but they are now usually separated in another genus, Squalius (e.g. the chub, Squalius cephalus). The delimitation of Leuciscus and Squalius is not completely resolved; some species have been moved from one genus to the other only in recent years. The genera Petroleuciscus and Telestes have also been split off from Leuciscus recently; for the latter the same holds true as for Squalius regarding the unclear delimitations.

== Species ==
Leuciscus contains the following species:

- Leuciscus aspius (Linnaeus, 1758) (asp)
- Leuciscus baicalensis (Dybowski, 1874) (Siberian dace)
- Leuciscus bearnensis (Blanchard, 1866) (Bearn beaked dace)
- Leuciscus bergi Kashkarov, 1925
- Leuciscus burdigalensis Valenciennes, 1844 (beaked dace)
- Leuciscus chuanchicus (Kessler, 1876)
- Leuciscus danilewskii (Kessler, 1877) (Danilevskii's dace)
- Leuciscus dzungaricus Paepke & F. Koch, 1998
- Leuciscus idus (Linnaeus, 1758) (ide)
- Leuciscus latus (Keyserling, 1861)
- Leuciscus lehmanni J. F. Brandt, 1852 (Zeravshan dace)
- Leuciscus leuciscus (Linnaeus, 1758) (common dace)
- Leuciscus lindbergi Zanin & Eremejev, 1934
- Leuciscus merzbacheri (Zugmayer, 1912)
- Leuciscus oxianus (Kessler 1877)
- Leuciscus oxyrrhis (La Blanchère, 1873) (long-snout dace)
- Leuciscus schmidti (Herzenstein, 1896)
- Leuciscus vorax (Heckel, 1843)
- Leuciscus waleckii (Dybowski, 1869) (Amur ide)
