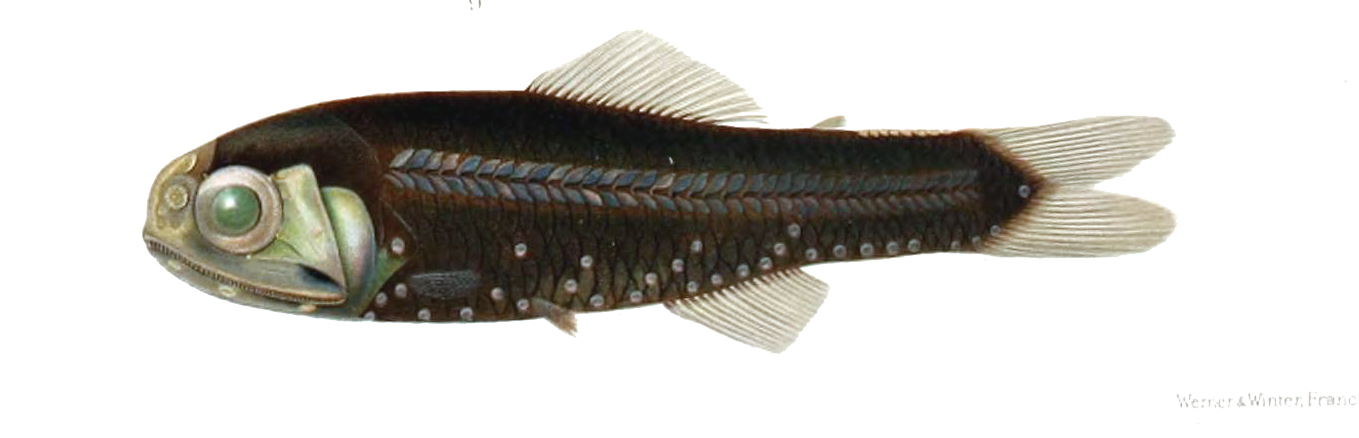
- Dofleini's lanternfish (L. dofleini)
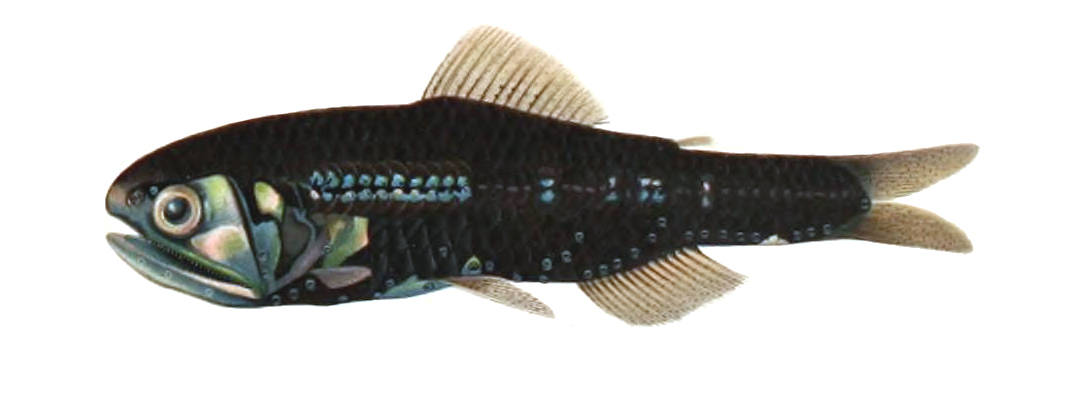
- Cocco's lanternfish (L. gemellarii)

Scientific classification
- Kingdom: Animalia
- Phylum: Chordata
- Class: Actinopterygii
- Order: Myctophiformes
- Family: Myctophidae
- Genus: Lobianchia; Gatti, 1904

= Lobianchia =

Genus of fishes

Lobianchia is a genus of lanternfishes. Both known species are found in the Atlantic Ocean, but one (Lobianchia gemellarii) is found all other non-polar oceans. The generic name was derived from Latin lobus ("lobe") and Greek αγχόνη (anchonē, "noose").

== Species ==
There are currently two recognized species in this genus:

- Lobianchia dofleini (Zugmayer, 1911) (Dofleini's lanternfish)
- Lobianchia gemellarii (Cocco, 1838) (Cocco's lanternfish)
