= Bearn beaked dace =

Conservation status
- Least Concern (IUCN 3.1)

Scientific classification
- Kingdom: Animalia
- Phylum: Chordata
- Class: Actinopterygii
- Order: Cypriniformes
- Family: Leuciscidae
- Subfamily: Leuciscinae
- Genus: Leuciscus
- Species: L. bearnensis

Binomial name
- Leuciscus bearnensis (Blanchard, 1866)

Synonyms
- Squalius bearnensis Blanchard, 1866

Species of fish

The Bearn beaked dace (Leuciscus bearnensis) is a species of freshwater ray-finned fish belonging to the family Leuciscidae. This species has been recorded from several localities in the Adour drainage in France.

== Taxonomy ==
The Bearn beaked dace was first formally described as Squlaius bearnensis in 1866 by the French zoologist Émile Blanchard with its type locality given as Lac de Mouriscot, near Biarritz. In the past it was regarded as a synonym of both the common dace (L. leuciscus) and the beaked dace (L. burdigalensis). It is now classified as a valid species in the genus Leuciscus within the subfamily Leuciscinae of the family Leuciscidae.

== Etymology ==
The Bearn beaked dace is a member of the genus Leuciscus, a name derived tautonymously from the type species' name, Cyprinus leuciscus. Leuciscus is from the Greek leukískos, a "white mullet" which is a diminutive of leukós, meaning "white", an allusion to the silvery sides of the common dace. The specific name, bearnensis , means "of Béarn, the area of France the type locality is in.

== Description ==
The Bearn beaked dace is distinguished from other western European members of the genus Leuciscus by having a keel which runs from its nape to the origin of the dorsal fin, a projecting snout which has a rounded tip and a projecting upper jaw, the dorsal profile of head and body shows a distinct hump; the snout is 32-35% of the length of the head; and the lateral line has around 47-52 scales. It also has thick, fleshy lips and a large eye, the diameter of them being approximately a fifth to a quarter of the length of the head. It grows to 280mm in standard length.

== Distribution ==
The Bearn beaked dave occurs only in the drainage basin of the Adour in south-western France

== Habitat and ecology ==
The Bearn beaked dace is found in streams, especially in sections of the streams which have clear water and current with cool, deep pools.

== See also ==
- Beaked dace
- Long-snout dace
