= Long-snout dace =

Conservation status
- Least Concern (IUCN 3.1)

Scientific classification
- Kingdom: Animalia
- Phylum: Chordata
- Class: Actinopterygii
- Order: Cypriniformes
- Family: Leuciscidae
- Subfamily: Leuciscinae
- Genus: Leuciscus
- Species: L. oxyrrhis

Binomial name
- Leuciscus oxyrrhis (La Blanchère, 1873)

Synonyms
- Squalius oxyrrhis La Blanchère, 1873

Species of fish

The long-snout dace (Leuciscus oxyrrhis) is a species of freshwater ray-finned fish belonging to the family Leuciscidae, which includes the daces, minnows and related species. This species is found in the Garonne drainage in France.

== Taxonomy ==
The long-snout dace was first formally described as Squlaius oxyrrhis in 1873 by the French zoologist Henri de La Blanchère with its type locality given as the Aveyron, upper Lot, Truyère, Argence (Truyère), and Viaur rivers in France. In the past it was regarded as a synonym of the beaked dace (L. burdigalensis). It is now classified as a valid species in the genus Leuciscus within the subfamily Leuciscinae of the family Leuciscidae.

== Etymology ==
The long-snout dace is a member of the genus Leuciscus, a name derived tautonymously from the type species' name, Cyprinus leuciscus. Leuciscus is from the Greek leukískos, a "white mullet" which is a diminutive of leukós, meaning "white", an allusion to the silvery sides of the common dace. The specific name, oxyrrhis, combines oxýs, meaning "sharp" or "pointed". and rhis, which means "nose", a reference to the long, pointed snout projecting beyond the mouth.

== Description ==
The long-snout dace is distinguished from other Western European daces by a comobation of the following characteristics: there is no dorsal keel between the nape and the origin of the dorsal fin, the dorsal profile of the head and back is smooth with no hump, the upper jaw projects and thick fleshy lips. This species has a maximum standard length of 40 cm (16 in).

== Distribution and habitat ==
The long-snout dace is found in the upper Tarn, Lot and Dordogne river systems, these are all right bank tributaries of the Garonne in southwestern France. It prefers moderate to fast flowing stretches of rivers and streams with a coarse substrate.
