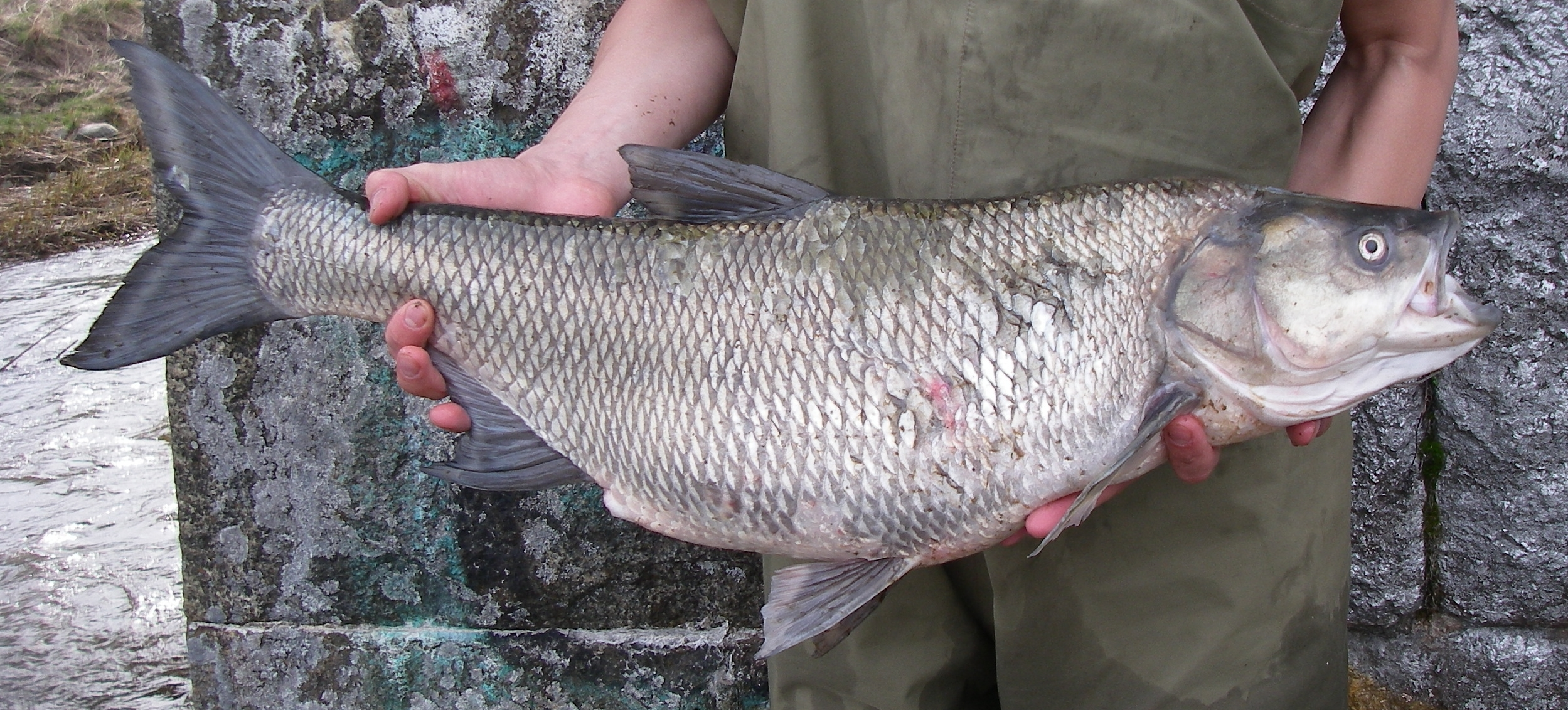

Conservation status
- Least Concern (IUCN 3.1)

Scientific classification
- Kingdom: Animalia
- Phylum: Chordata
- Class: Actinopterygii
- Division: Teleostei
- Order: Cypriniformes
- Family: Leuciscidae
- Genus: Leuciscus
- Species: L. aspius

Binomial name
- Leuciscus aspius (Linnaeus, 1758)

Synonyms
- Cyprinus aspius Linnaeus, 1758; Aspius aspius (Linnaeus, 1758); Cyprinus rapax Leske, 1774; Cyprinus rapax Pallas, 1814; Cyprinus taeniatus Eichwald, 1831; Aspius rapax Agassiz, 1835; Aspius vulgaris Leiblein [V.] 1853; Alburnus iblioides Kessler, 1872; Aspius rapax var. jaxartensis Kessler, 1874; Aspius erytrostomus Kessler, 1877; Aspius linnei Malm, 1877; Aspius transcaucasicus Warpachowski, 1896

= Asp (fish) =

Species of fish

The asp (Leuciscus aspius) is a species of freshwater ray-finned fish belonging to the family Leuciscidae, which includes the daces, minnows and related fishes. This species is found in continental Europe and western Asia.

== Taxonomy ==
The asp was first formally described as Cyprinus aspius by Carl Linnaeus in the 10th edition of Systema Naturae published in 1758, the type locality being given as the lakes of Sweden. It is now classified in the genus Leuciscus within the subfamily Leuciscinae of the family Leuciscidae.

== Etymology ==
The asp is a member of the genus Leuciscus, a name derived tautonymously from the type species' name, Cyprinus leuciscus. Leuciscus is from the Greek leukískos, a "white mullet" which is a diminutive of leukós, meaning "white", an allusion to the silvery sides of the common dace. The specific name, aspius, is a latinisation of asp, a name derived from esping or esp, which are Swedish common names for this fish, these names may be an allusion to the spawning run of this fish being concurrent with the flowering of the aspen tree.

== Description ==
The asp has 3 spines and between 7 and 9 soft rays supporting its dorsal fin, while the anal fin contains 3 spines and between 12 and 15 soft rays, 12 to 14 1/2 of the anal fin rays are branched. The lateral line is made up of 64 to 76 scales. The maxilla reaches past the front margin of the eye. There is a sharp keel between the origin of the pelvic fin and the origin of the anal fin, this keel is covered by scales. The body is long and laterally compressed with the head being long with a pointed snout. The back is green tinted with silver and blue, the sides are paler, and the belly is silvery white. The pectoral, pelvic and anal fins are coloured grey to brown. This species has a maximum total length of 120 cm (47 in), although 55 cm (22 in) is more typical, and a maximum published weight of 9 kg (20 lb).

== Distribution and habitat ==
The asp is native to large lowland rivers and lakes in Europe. It is native to river systems which drain into the North Sea, the Baltic Sea, the Black Sea, Sea of Azov, Aegean Sea, Caspian Sea and Aral Sea. In the North and Baltic Sea drainages this species occurs from the drainages of the Weser and Elbe east, including southern Norway, Sweden and Finland to the Baltic states. It is found in most of the river systems draining into the Black Sea and Sea of Azov but is not found on the Crimean Peninsula, the coastal drainages in Bulgaria south of the Danube Delta, northern Turkey east of the Yenice River, Georgia, and the Russian coast east of the Kerch Strait. Asps are found in all of the rivers draining into the Caspian Sea, except for those on the eastern coast. In the Balkans it is found only in the drainage systems of the Struma and Maritsa in Greece and Bulgaria, and also in Lake Volvi, Greece.

Outside of its native range the asp has been artificially introduced to the Scheldt in France, Belgium and the Netherlands; the Rhine in Germany; the Seine and Loire rivers in France; the Muga River in Spain; the Po River in Italy; the Northern Dvina River in Russia; and Lake Balkhash in Kazakhstan.

== Biology ==
The asp is rare among cyprinoid fishes in that it is a predatory fish which feeds on other fishes and even small waterbirds. The juveniles are gregarious predators, but the adults are solitary, or hunt in small groups. At all ages their main prey is fish, particularly the common bleak (Alburnus alburnus) and European smelt (Osmerus eperlanus). They can live for over 10 years. The spawn in the Spring, from mid-March to mid-April in Europe and as late as May in the Volga.The females release their eggs over gravel or in submerged vegetation and they stick to the substrate. Some populations are migratory and forage in estuaries or brackish seas and migrate into freshwater to breed, starting to migrate upstream in October and remaining in the rivers until the Spring. The asp and the ide (leuciscus idus) frequently hybridise where their ranges overlap.

== Human utilisation ==
The asp is used as both a food fish and for sport fishing.

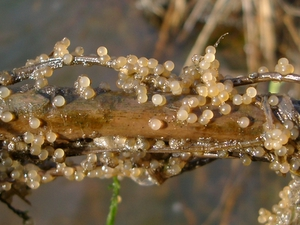
Eggs from asp

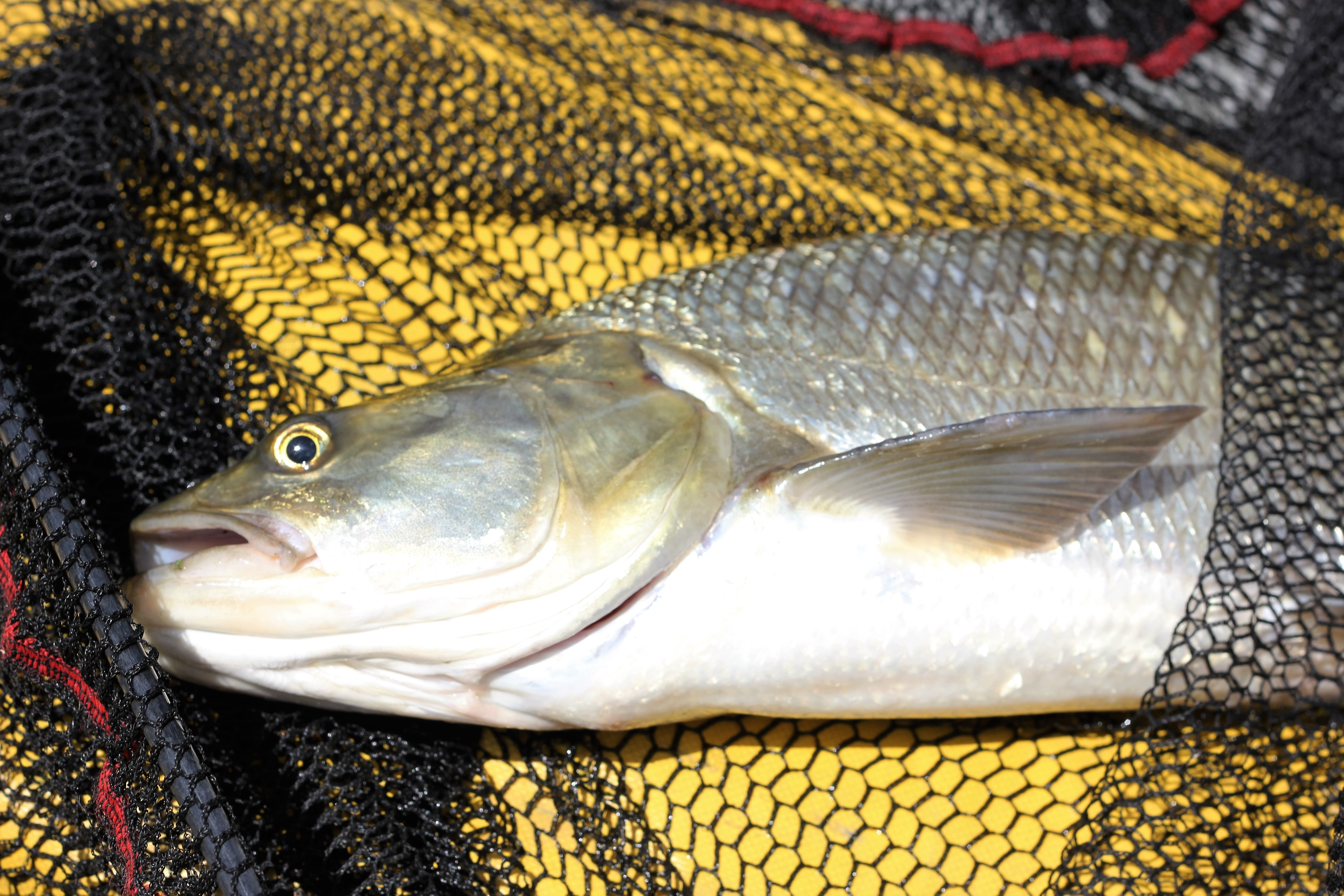
A 4-kg asp caught in Biesbosch, NL

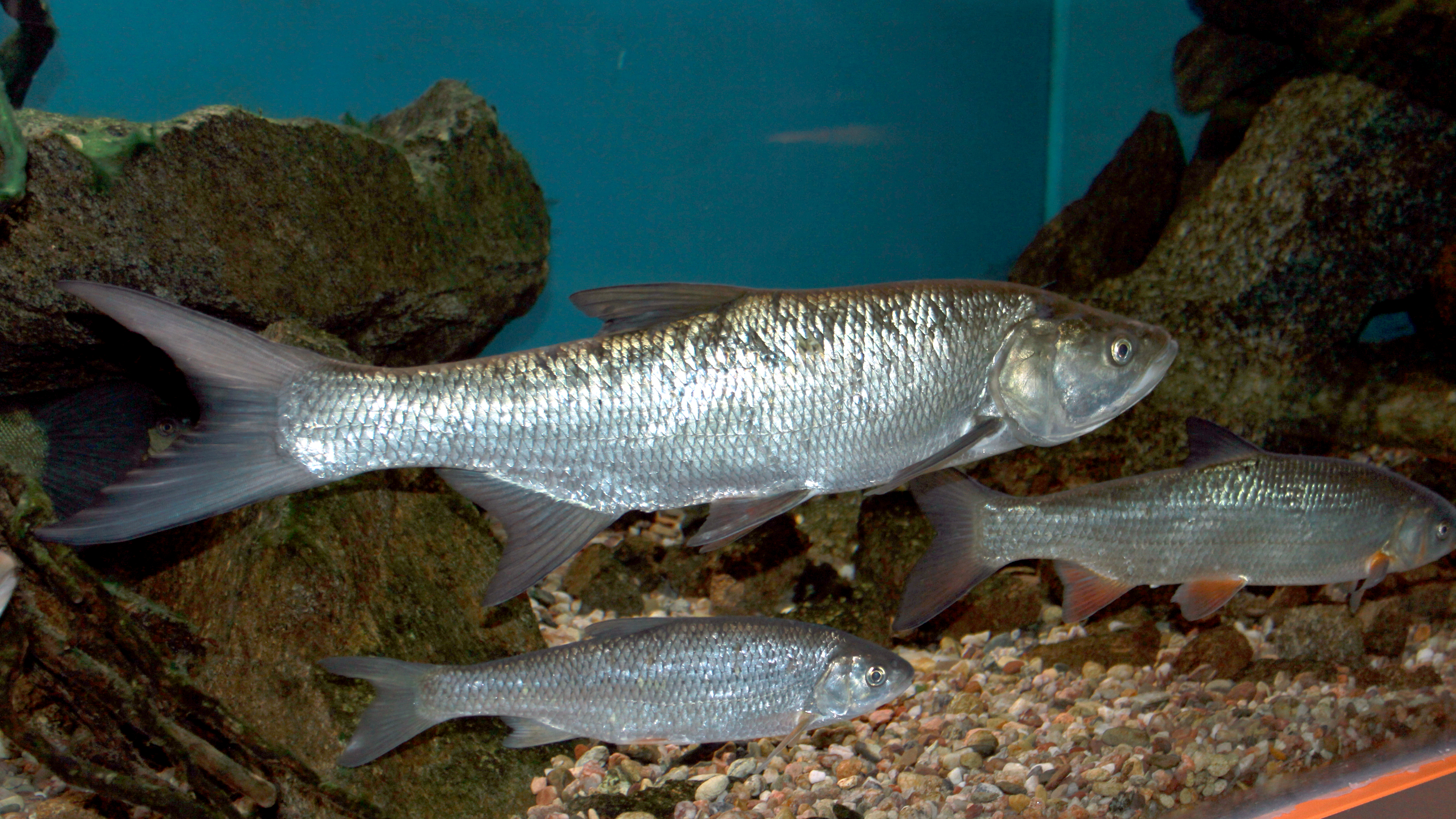
Asp on exhibition Subaqueous Vltava in Prague
