= C6orf47 =

Gene on human chromosome 6

Identifiers
- Aliases: C6orf47, D6S53E, G4, NG34, chromosome 6 open reading frame 47
- External IDs: MGI: 90673; GeneCards: C6orf47

Gene location (Human)
Chr.	Chromosome 6 (human)
Band	6p21.33	Start	31,658,298 bp
Band	6p21.33	End	31,660,778 bp

Gene location (Mouse)
Chr.	Chromosome 17 (mouse)
Band	17 B1|17 18.59 cM	Start	35,345,349 bp
Band	17 B1|17 18.59 cM	End	35,347,831 bp
RNA expression pattern
Bgee	Human / Mouse (ortholog); Top expressed in: granulocyte; mucosa of transverse colon; apex of heart; blood; duodenum; left ventricle; gastrocnemius muscle; monocyte; muscle layer of sigmoid colon; islet of Langerhans / Top expressed in: colon; granulocyte; duodenum; jejunum; thymus; lip; ileum; skeletal muscle tissue; muscle of thigh; spleen; More reference expression data
BioGPS	n/a
Orthologs
Databases	NCBI: entry; OMA: entry
Species	Human	Mouse
Entrez	57827	114585
Ensembl	ENSG00000203623; ENSG00000235360; ENSG00000228177; ENSG00000228435; ENSG00000204439 ENSG00000226103; ENSG00000226531	ENSMUSG00000043311
UniProt	O95873	Q9Z1R4
RefSeq (mRNA)	NM_021184	NM_033477
RefSeq (protein)	NP_067007	NP_258438
Location (UCSC)	Chr 6: 31.66 – 31.66 Mb	Chr 17: 35.35 – 35.35 Mb
PubMed search
- Wikidata
View/Edit Human	View/Edit Mouse

C6orf47 is a gene. In humans, it is on chromosome 6.

== Gene ==
In humans, Chromosome 6 open reading frame 47, C6ORF47, is a single exon gene that spans 2481 nucleotides that encodes for a 294 amino acid protein.

=== Location ===
In humans, this gene is located on the minus strand at 6p21.33.

=== Gene expression ===
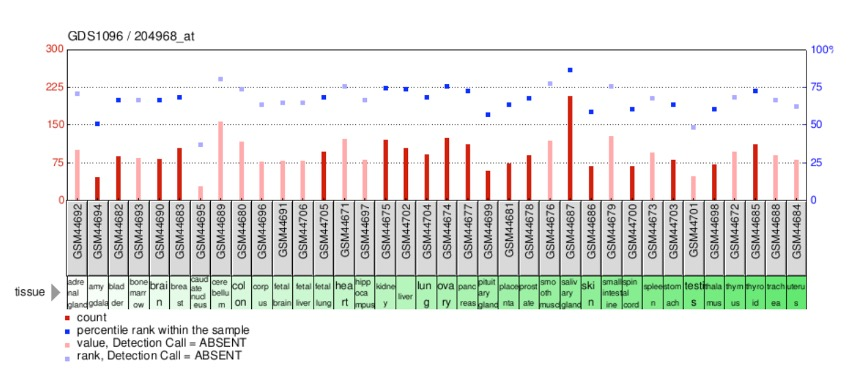
NCBI GEO shows that C6ORF47 RNA is expressed ubiquitously varying from low expression (in most tissues) to high expression in a couple of areas. The Salivary Gland and Cerebellum showed high RNA expression levels.

Tissue expression in human C6ORF47 was found to ubiquitously expressed throughout all tissues. C6ORF47 gene is also seen to be over-expressed in the colon, urinary bladder, ovary, and pancreas. NCBI GEO Profiles shows that C6ORF47 RNA is expressed ubiquitously varying from low expression (in most tissues) to high expression in a couple of areas like the Salivary Gland and Cerebellum.

Research by Pontus Boström et al. looked into C6ORF47 mRNA expression using microarray data from macrophages from 4 healthy donors. The goal of this study was to investigate whether or not hypoxia can influence the accumulation of lipids in macrophages. These results would help identify whether or not the macrophages loaded with lipids in the atherosclerotic lesions are there because of the hypoxic regions. Human macrophages were exposed to hypoxia for 24 hours and showed an increased formation of cytosolic lipid droplets and increased tri-glyceride accumulation. Results showed that the hypoxic regions in the atherosclerotic lesions could contribute to forming lipid-loaded macrophages and accumulating triglycerides.^{8} As we can see below, expression of C6ORF47 shows that expression is almost 6 times greater in the non-hypoxic region than in the hypoxic regions, showing that C6ORF47 is likely not contributing to either the lipid accumulation or an essential process since expression decreased. Once put under hypoxic conditions, only essential processes are left on likely hence when C6ORF47 expression decreased.

=== Transcription factors ===
Below is a short list of transcription factors binding to the promoter region, contains 5' UTR and 500 nucleotides upstream. Bioline software was utilized for the double-stranded DNA sequence. UCSC genome browers was used for transcription factors and binding sites providing the information of the transcription factors that bind listed below in the table (click show button below).

Transcription factor	Generalized Function
KLF17, Krüppel-like factor 17	regulates gene expression, influencing cell differentiation and development.
PROX1, Prospero homeobox 1	Regulates lymphatic development, cell differentiation, and organogenesis processes.
WT1, Wilms' tumor 1	Regulates kidney development, cell growth, and tissue differentiation processes
GATA1, GATA binding protein 1	Controls red blood cell development and regulates hematopoiesis processes.
THRB, Thyroid hormone receptor beta	Regulates thyroid hormone signaling, influencing metabolism and growth regulation.
ZNF454, Zinc Finger Protein 454	Regulates gene expression, potentially influencing cell differentiation and development.
SP9, Specificity Protein 9	Regulates cartilage development and skeletal patterning during embryogenesis.
EGR3, Early Growth Response 3	Regulates gene expression involved in neuronal activity and immune response.
SOX4, SRY-box transcription factor 4	Regulates cell fate, development, and differentiation in multiple tissues.
EBF1, Early B-cell Factor 1	Regulates B cell differentiation and immune system development.
ZNF669, Zinc Finger Protein 669	Regulates gene expression, potentially involved in development and differentiation.
KLF1 Krüppel-like factor 1	Regulates red blood cell development and hemoglobin expression.
STAT3, Signal Transducer and Activator of Transcription 3	Regulates immune response, cell survival, and inflammation processes.
ZIC3, Zinc Finger of the Cerebellum 3	Regulates brain and heart development, influencing neuronal patterning and function.
NHLH2, Nighthawk-like Protein 2	Regulates neural differentiation and development, influencing nervous system patterning.
ZNF454, Zinc Finger Protein 454	Involved in transcriptional regulation, potentially affecting gene expression and development.
EBF2, Early B-cell Factor 2	Regulates adipocyte differentiation and energy metabolism, influencing fat tissue development.
ZNF42, Zinc Finger Protein 42	Involved in regulating gene expression and cellular differentiation processes.
ERF::FIGLA, ETS2 Repressor Factor and Factor of Germline Alpha	Transcription factor complex that regulates ovarian development and folliculogenesis.

=== Single-nucleotide-polymorphisms (snps) ===
SNPs	Position	Base Change	Amino Acid Change	Mutation Type	Significance	Clinical Significance
Rs963273525	Amino Acid 1	TC	MetVal	Missense	In start codon (CDS)	N/A
Rs1800736098	Base pair 8	CA	N/A	Transversion mutation	Conserved Transcription binding region (NHLH2) in 5’ UTR that is conserved between all orthologs tested	N/A
Rs1296872402	Base pair 2425	TG	N/A	Transversion mutation	PolyA signal (3’ UTR) that is conserved in all orthologs tested	N/A

This table above illustrates 3 SNPs that occur within the CDS, 5' UTR, and 3' UTR. These SNPs were found using Variation Viewer These SNPs were chosen due to location within C6ORF47 gene. Variation Viewer showed no pathogenic SNPs and only large deletions that include copious gene.

== Protein ==
=== Basic information ===
- The encoded protein weighs 31,579 daltons (~31 kD).
- EMBL-EBI-SAPS found the human C6ORF47 protein to have a isoelectric point of 5.95.
- C6ORF47 protein was shown to be slightly more abundant than half of the proteins present in the human body.

=== Family ===
The C6ORF47 protein belongs to the family of proteins referred to as MHC proteins (Major histocompatibility complex) which is a band on the short arm of chromosome located at 6p21.3 that spans 3.6 megabases. The generalized function of MHC molecules is to bind peptide fragments that are from pathogens and display them on the surface of the cell for recognition by T cells. C6ORF47 protein is considered to be part of the MHC Class III protein. MHC class III proteins are noted to be poorly defined structurally and functionally. It is noted that the MHC Class III genes contain cytokines and heat shock proteins within this region. It was recently found that genes encoded in the telomeric region on the MHC class III and appears to be involved in specific and global inflammatory responses.

=== Primary ===
Human C6ORF47 mRNA encodes for a 294 amino acid protein. SAPS also showed that the protein had shown enrichment of leucine, proline, and glycine in C6ORF47 protein compared to other human proteins. It had also shown that a significantly lower amount of isoleucine as well as lower valine, tyrosine, threonine, phenylalanine, and asparagine than normal in the C6ORF47 protein when compared to other human proteins. Repeats of leucine residues spaced seven amino acids apart in the basic leucine zipper (as shown in blue text in the conceptual translation below on right) and was found to be conserved in mammalian orthologs of the C6ORF47 protein via Motif Scan.

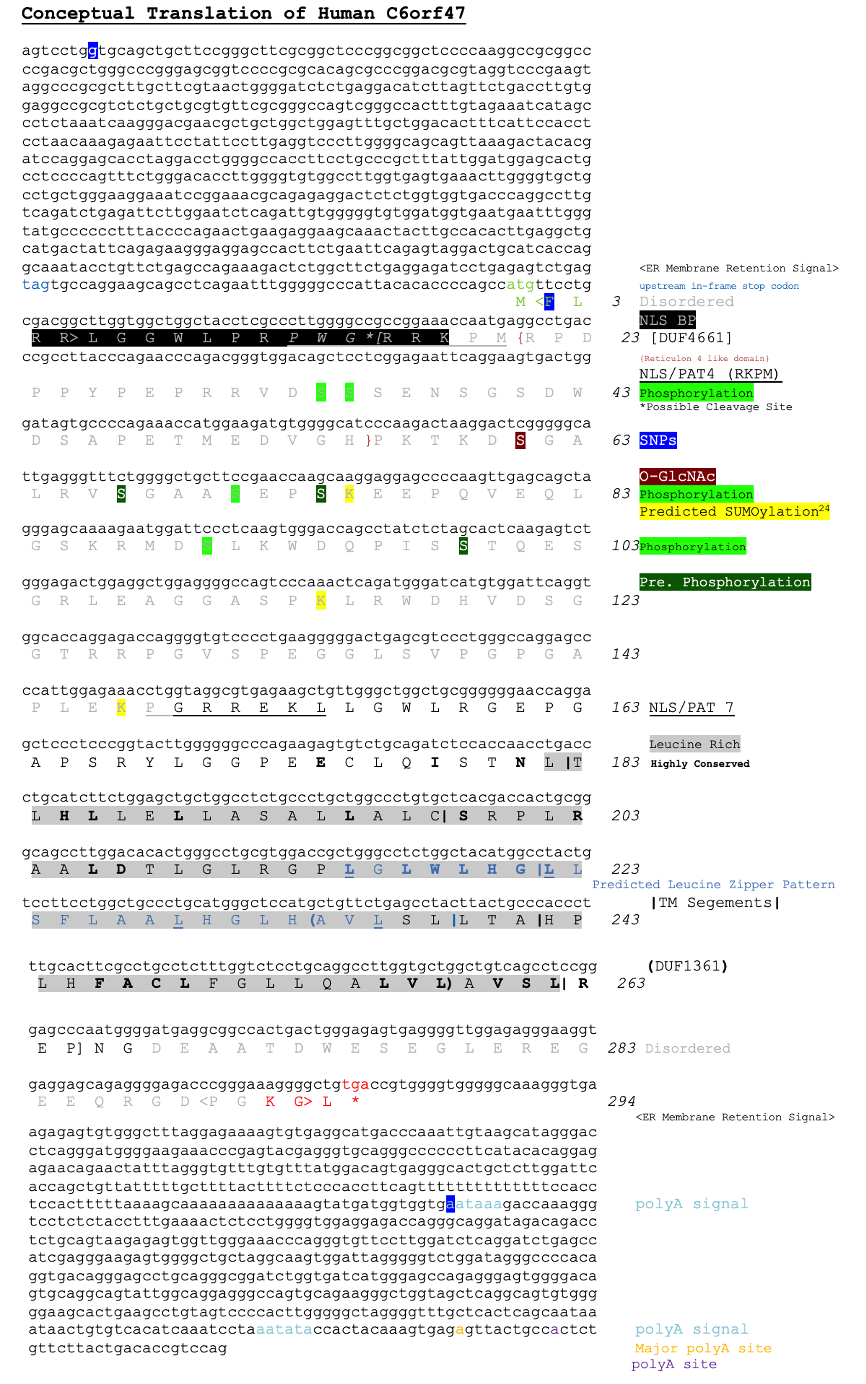
Conceptual Translation of human C6ORF47 gene.

=== Secondary ===
PredictProtein predicted that the secondary structure of the human C6ORF47 protein was 35.4% helix, 2.4% strand, and 62.2% loop.

=== Tertiary ===
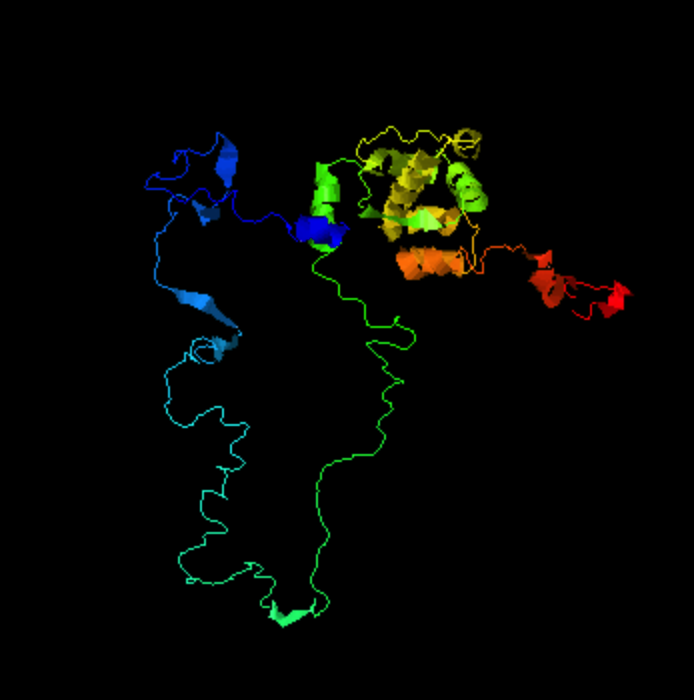
I-TASSER predicted tertiary structure for human C6ORF47 protein.

PSORT II prediction tool showed three transmembrane segments in amino acids 182-198, 222-238, and 246-262 of the human C6ORF47 protein.

All of the mammalian orthologs presented show quite similar transmembrane regions (close in A.A sequence locations) besides the platypus (See table below for all Mammalian ortholgos used).

Due to other C6ORF47 orthologs mainly being much shorter than the mammalian sequences, the predicted cleavage site is usually slightly higher, while the transmembrane segments vary depending on the length of protein sequences. 1-2 transmembrane segments were found in reptiles, one of the two amphibians, and one fish ortholog, but it is by far still most popular to have 3 transmembrane segments in orthologs.

PSORT II showed that the C6ORF47 protein is predicted to be localized in the endoplasmic reticulum (55.6%). DeepLoc software further supports the idea that the C6ORF47 protein is localized to the endoplasmic reticulum, showing that there is about an 86.12% chance that it is localized there. It also supports the idea previous finding by PSORT II prediction and SOSUI about human C6ORF47 protein being a transmembrane protein (93.6% chance).

=== Post-translational modifications ===
Phosphorylation sites were experimentally proven on amino acids 34, 35, 71, and 90 in the human C6ORF47 protein via NCBI. Sites 34 and 35 are predicted to be phosphorylated by Casein Kinase II.

Endoplasmic Reticulum (ER) signals ensure the protein remains in the endoplasmic reticulum, aiding proper folding, quality control, and trafficking.

Sumoylation attaches SUMO proteins to targets, regulating nuclear transport, transcription, DNA repair, and protein stability. Sumolyation was found at amino acids 75, 114, and 147.

O-linked β-N-acetylglucosamine modifies serine/threonine residues, regulating signaling, transcription, and protein-protein interactions dynamically and was found to be at amino acid 60.

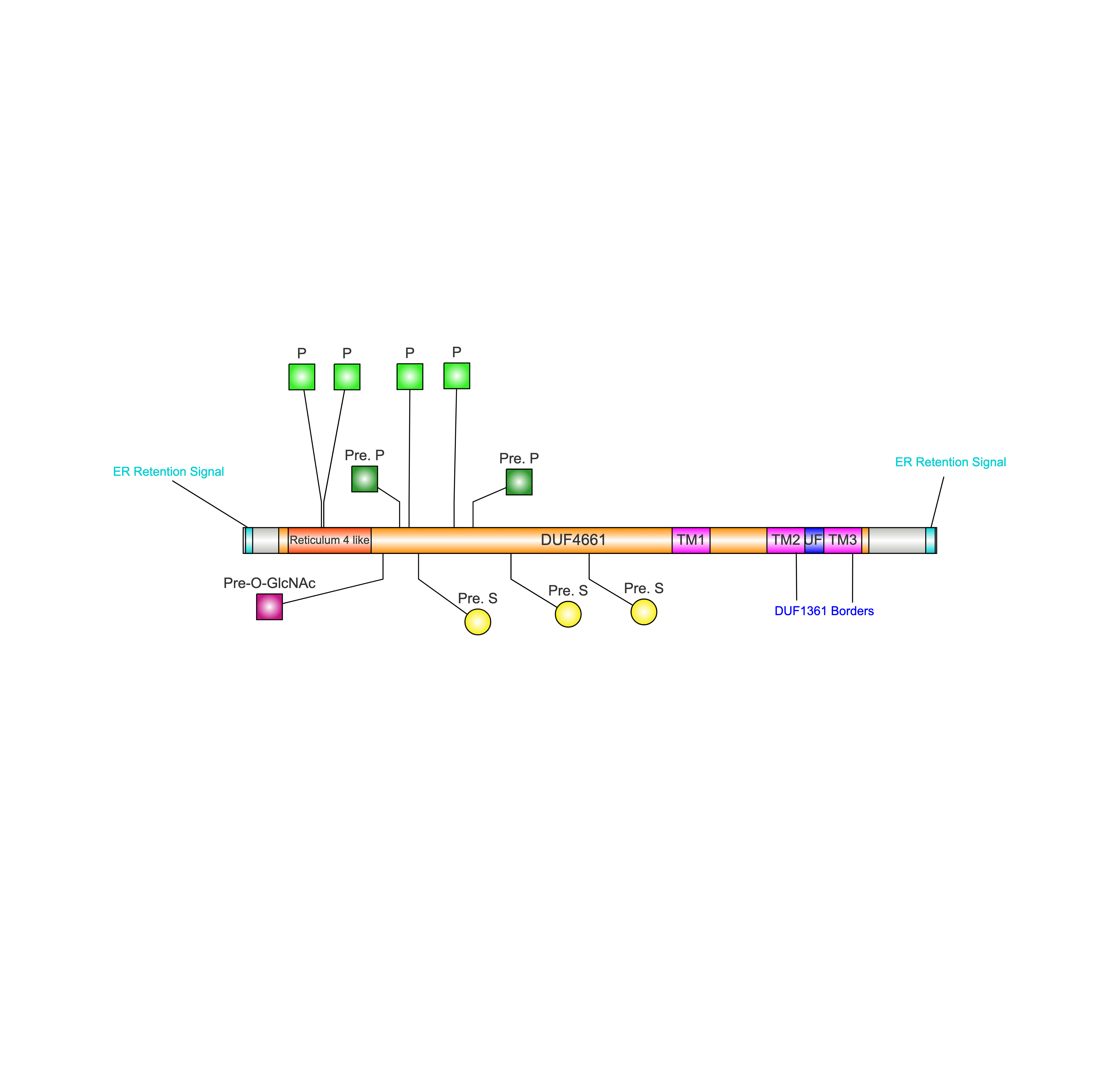
Human C6ORF47 protein with annotated domains, transmembrane regions, and post-translational modifications. P=experimentally proven phosphorylation sites, Pre. P=predicted phosphorylation sites that showed a likelihood of above 0.5, Pre. S= predicted sumoylation sites, TM= transmembrane segments, and Pre-O-GlcNAc= predicted O-linked β-N-acetylglucosamine.

=== Interactions ===
FGFR3: An interaction of C6ORF47 and FGFR3 was found via a two-hybrid assay with an average detection confidence of medium. This was found via a BioGRID interaction database that was found in August 2022 during a large-scale dataset being scored individually and all other interactions globally.

Fibroblast growth factor receptor 3, FGFR3, is part of the fibroblast growth factor receptor family that shares similar structure and functions. FGFR3 is known to span the membrane with one end remaining within the membrane while the other end projects to the outer surface of the cell. Fibroblast growth factor receptor 3 is known to play an important role in cartilage development in the growth plate. FGFR3, commonly known as fibroblast growth factor receptor 3, is a tyrosine-protein kinase that acts on the cell-surface receptor for fibroblast growth factors and plays an essential role in cell proliferation, angiogenesis, differentiation, and apoptosis. FGFR3 is known to interact with growth factors outside the cell and receive signals that regulate growth and development within the cell.

== Homology ==
=== Orthologs ===
C6ORF47 gene is estimated to have first appeared approximately 563 million years ago (MYA) in lampreys. C6ORF47 was found in ray-fined fish (actinopterygii), cartilaginous fish, lampreys, and lobe-finned fish (sacropterygii), but no hagfish suggesting that possibly this gene was inserted into lampreys. C6ORF47 is conserved to vertebrates with no traces of it being present before vertebrates as seen by its oldest ancestor lampreys (563 MYA). The C6ORF47 gene evolved quite rapid since it was shown to evolve slightly slower than Fibrinogen Alpha and it much faster than Cytochrome C. Orthologs used for this diagram included Human, House Mouse, African Bush Elephant, Koala , Painted Turtle, Eastern Brown Snake, Iberian ribbed newt, West African Lungfish, Danio rerio, Seven-gill Sharpnose Shark, and Sea Lamprey) (See Time-Calibrated comparative date of divergence diagram located to the down to the right).

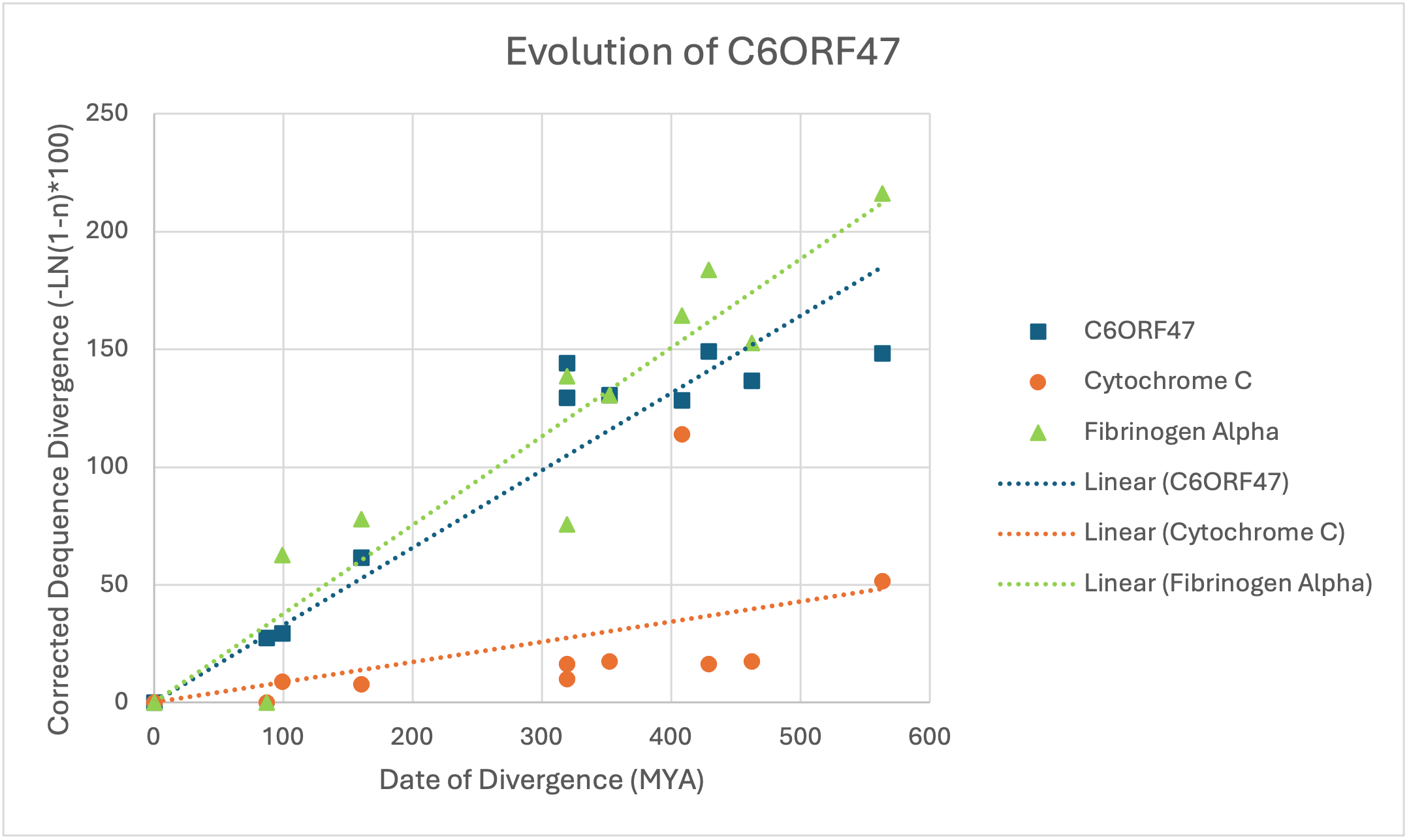
Time-Calibrated comparative date of divergence diagram comparing the evolution of C6ORF47, Cytochrome C, and Fibrinogen Alpha. Orthologs used for this table are as listed: Human, House Mouse, African Bush Elephant, Koala , Painted Turtle, Eastern Brown Snake, Iberian ribbed newt, West African Lungfish, Zebrafish, Seven-gill Sharpnose Shark, and Sea Lamprey.

Global Alignments with Human C6ORF47 protein with the seven-gill sharpnose shark C6ORF47 protein showed two noticeable large gaps found from human C6ORF47 protein in amino acids 44-62 and 153-173 . These gaps were present in all descendants of vertebrates until rodents and rabbits. The second global alignment with the human C6ORF47 protein and pacific pocket mouse (rodent) C6ORF47 protein shows that these gaps are no longer present indicating a possible insertions of these gaps in the protein in mammals. The pacific pocket mouse C6ORF47 protein was one of the least related sequences within the rodents from the orthologs table and still showed these 2 large gaps being no longer being present when aligned with the human C6ORF47 protein sequence.

=== Ortholog table for C6ORF47 protein ===
C6ORF47	Genus and Species	Common Name	Taxonomic Order	Date of Divergence (MYA)	Accession #	Sequence (aa)	Identity(%)	Similariity (%)	Gaps (%)
Mammals	Homo sapiens	Humans	Primates	0	NP_067007	294	100	100	0
	Perognathus longimembris pacificus	Pacific Pocket Mouse	Rodentia	87	XP_048204128	293	79.3	84	0.3
	Mus musculus	House Mouse	Rodentia	87	NP_258438	293	75.9	81.3	0.3
	Loxodonta africana	African Bush Elephant	Proboscideans	99	XP_003422325	297	74.5	81.5	1.7
	Phascolarctos cinereus	Koala	Diprotodontia	160	XP_020829739	302	54	63.8	10.8
	Vombatus ursinus	Common Wombat	Diprotodontia	160	XP_027732497	300	55	66.1	6.5
	Ornithorhynchus anatinus	Platypus	Monotremata	180	XP_028911230	241	42.3	50.2	31.2
Reptile	Chrysemys picta bellii	Painted Turtle	Testudines	319	XP_005289373	199	23.4	29.4	52
	Terrapene triunguis	Three-toed Box Turtle	Testudines	319	XP_024079724	174	20.4	25.1	59.9
	Anolis sagrei	Brown Anole	Squamata	319	XP_060615449	217	25.9	34.5	36.7
	Pseudonaja textilis	Eastern Brown Snake	Squamata	319	XP_026575869	212	27.4	36.6	38.9
Amphibians	Xenopus laevis	African Clawed Frog	Anura	352	XP_018088740	224	21.4	30.3	39.6
	Pleurodeles waltl	Iberian ribbed newt	Urodela	352	KAJ1134448	268	27.1	32.9	36.2
Fish	Protopterus annectens	West African Lungfish	Lepidosireniformes	408	XP_043939206	289	27.7	39.2	24.4
	Misgurnus anguillicaudatus	Pond Loach	Cypriniformes	429	XP_055075080	302	25.4	39	27.7
	Cirrhinus molitorella	Mud Carp	Cypriniformes	429	KAK2887169	311	24	38	23.1
	Danio rerio	Zebra fish	Cypriniformes	429	NP_001410332	315	22.5	35.7	28.9
	Carcharodon carcharias	Great White Shark	Lamniformes	462	XP_041069364	250	22.5	30.4	40.9
	Heptranchias perlo	Seven-gill Sharpnose Shark	Hexanchiformes	462	XP_067830079	249	25.5	37.6	27.1
	Lethenteron reissneri	Far Eastern Brook Lamprey	Petromyzontiformes	563	XP_061406601	217	22.1	29.5	36.2
	Petromyzon marinus	Sea Lamprey	Petromyzontiformes	563	XP_032814877	215	22.7	30.4	35.3

The Table above illustrates 20 orthologs of C6ORF47 protein. This table shows a couple orthologs from each major class of class of vertebrates except Aves (Agnatha, Chondrichthyes, Osteichthyes, Amphibia, Reptilia, Mammalia). This is because the C6ORF47 gene is conserved in vertebrates. The identity, similarity, and gaps are referring to each of the orthologs protein amino acid contents being compared to the human C6ORF47 protein.

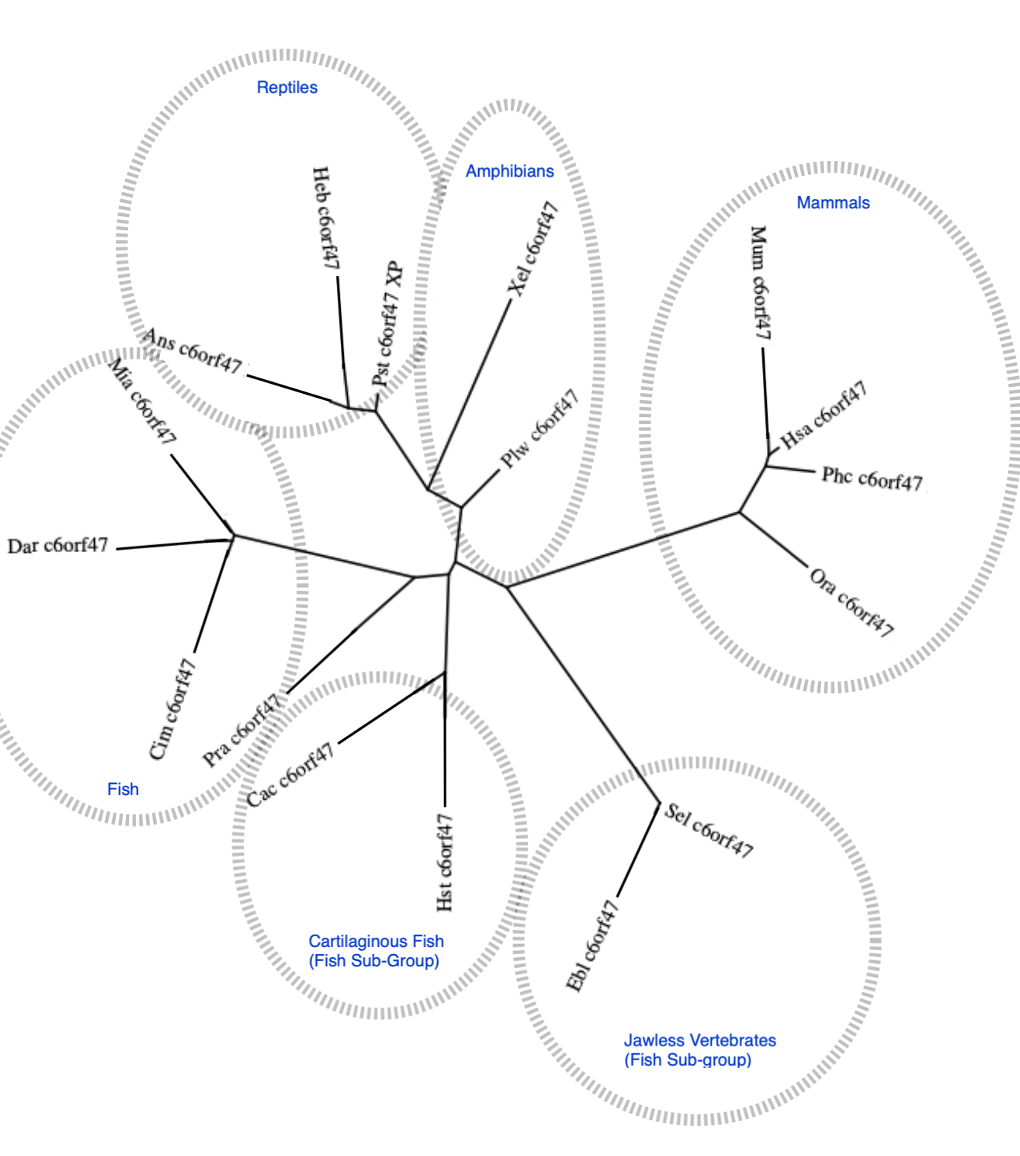
The C6ORF47 ortholog phylogenetic tree is limited to vertebrates because it is only conserved back to vertebrates.: Abbreviation (From MYA Youngest to Oldest) / Common Name; Hsa / Humans; Mum / House Mouse; Phc / Koala; Ora / Platypus; Heb (319 MYA) / Bynoes Gecko; Ans / Brown Anole; Pst / Eastern Brown Snake; Xel / African Clawed Frog; Plw / Iberian ribbed newt; Pra / West African Lungfish; Mia / Pond Loach; Cim / Mud Carp; Dar / Zebra fish; Cac / West African Lungfish; Hst / Pond Loach; Ebl / Far Eastern Brook Lamprey; Sel / Sea Lamprey

=== Paralogs ===
No paralogs were found for the human C6ORF47 gene in humans.

=== Conserved regions ===
The promoter region was found to have many stretched of nucleotides that were conserved across mammalian orthotlogs like transcriptional bindings sites of at least one SP9 spot (just upstream to 5' UTR), NHLH2 and ERF:FIGLA (just just after the start of transcription), ZNF454 (shortly after previous mentioned transcription factor; ~20 nucleotides downstream), EBF1 and EBF2 (~330 basepairs downstream of transcriptional start), NR5A2, ZNF423, STAT3 (all found ~120 basepairs downstream of previous transcription factor mentioned), and ZND42 (found overlaying the start of the coding sequence).

Multiple sequence alignments with C6ORF47 orthologs showed that there were many amino acids on the C-terminal side of the protein that are conserved while there is much less conservation in the N-terminal side. This is likely due to the protein containing a large disordered region on the N-terminal side.

The 3' UTR was found to have 9 conserved areas in it. Listed below in the table is all conserved ares that were found for C6ORF47

miRNA	Position in the UTR	seed match
Conserved sites in The 3' UTR		
hsa-miR-125b-5p	85-92	8mer
hsa-miR-4319	85-92	8mer
hsa-miR-125a-5p	85-92	8mer
hsa-miR-138-5p	204-210	7mer-m8
hsa-miR-24-3p	438-445	8mer
hsa-miR-137	677-684	8mer
hsa-miR-325-3p	679-685	7mer-1A
hsa-miR-140-5p	714-720	7mer-1A
hsa-miR-142-3p.1	716-722	7mer-1A
