= Leuciscus danilewskii =

Conservation status
- Least Concern (IUCN 3.1)

Scientific classification
- Kingdom: Animalia
- Phylum: Chordata
- Class: Actinopterygii
- Order: Cypriniformes
- Family: Leuciscidae
- Subfamily: Leuciscinae
- Genus: Leuciscus
- Species: L. danilewskii

Binomial name
- Leuciscus danilewskii (Kessler, 1877)

Synonyms
- Squalius danilewskii Kessler, 1877

Species of fish

Leuciscus danilewskii, also referred to as the Danilevskii's dace or Don dace, is a species of freshwater ray-finned fish belonging to the family Leuciscidae. This species occurs in the Don River basin in Ukraine and Russia. It is similar to the common dace (Leuciscus leuciscus), and is thought to replace it in the Don basin.
