= Béarn (disambiguation) =

Béarn or Bearn can refer to:

== Places ==
- Béarn, a former province of France
  - Estates of Béarn, the former Provincial Estates of Béarn
  - Fors de Bearn, or fueros of Béarn, are a series of former legal texts in the Viscounty of Béarn
  - Viscounty of Béarn, a former province of France
- Béarn, Quebec, a municipality in Canada

== People ==
- Alexander Gordon Bearn (1923–2009), American physician, scientist and author
- Pierre Béarn (1902–2004), French writer
- Viscounts of Béarn

== Other ==
- Béarn 6, an airplane
- Béarn AOC, a wine of South West France
- Bearn beaked dace (Leuciscus bearnensis), species of cyprinid fish
- French aircraft carrier Béarn

== See also ==
- Bern (disambiguation)
