= Leuciscus burdigalensis =

Conservation status
- Near Threatened (IUCN 3.1)

Scientific classification
- Kingdom: Animalia
- Phylum: Chordata
- Class: Actinopterygii
- Division: Teleostei
- Order: Cypriniformes
- Family: Leuciscidae
- Genus: Leuciscus
- Species: L. burdigalensis

Binomial name
- Leuciscus burdigalensis Valenciennes, 1844

Synonyms
- Aturius dufourii Dubalen, 1878

Species of fish

Leuciscus burdigalensis, the beaked dace, is a species of freshwater ray-finned fish belonging to the family Leuciscidae, the family which includes the daces, the minnows and related fishes. This species is endemic to Western France.

== Taxonomy ==
Leuciscus burdigalensis was first formally described in 1844 by the French zoologist Achille Valenciennes with its type locality givenas the Gironde estuary. In the past it was regarded as a synonym of, or as a subspecies of, the common dace (L. leuciscus) . It is now classified as a valid species in the genus Leuciscus within the subfamily Leuciscinae of the family Leuciscidae.

== Etymology ==
Leuciscus burdigalensis is a member of the genus Leuciscus, a name derived tautonymously from the type species' name, Cyprinus leuciscus. Leuciscus is from the Greek leukískos, a "white mullet" which is a diminutive of leukós, meaning "white", an allusion to the silvery sides of the common dace. The specific name, burdugalensis, means "of Burdigala, an ancient name for the city of Bordeaux which sits on the Gironde estuary.

== Description ==
Leuciscus burgidalensis differs from the closely related species in the genus Leuciscus in Western Europe by the lack of a ventral keel, having a protruding, pointed snout, a lower jaw which projects beyond the lower jaw, the dorsal profile of the head and body is smoothly rounded typically lacking a hump, and it has thick, fleshy lips. This fish has a maximum standard length of 40 cm (16 in).

== Distribution and habitat ==
Leuciscus burgidalensis is endemic to France where it occurs from in rivers draining into the Atlantic from Brittany south to the Gironde Estuary and east in the Mediterranean drainage from the Têt River to the Vidourle River. This species is found in fast-flowing stretches of river and large streams with coarse substrates.

== See also ==
- Bearn beaked dace
- Long-snout dace
