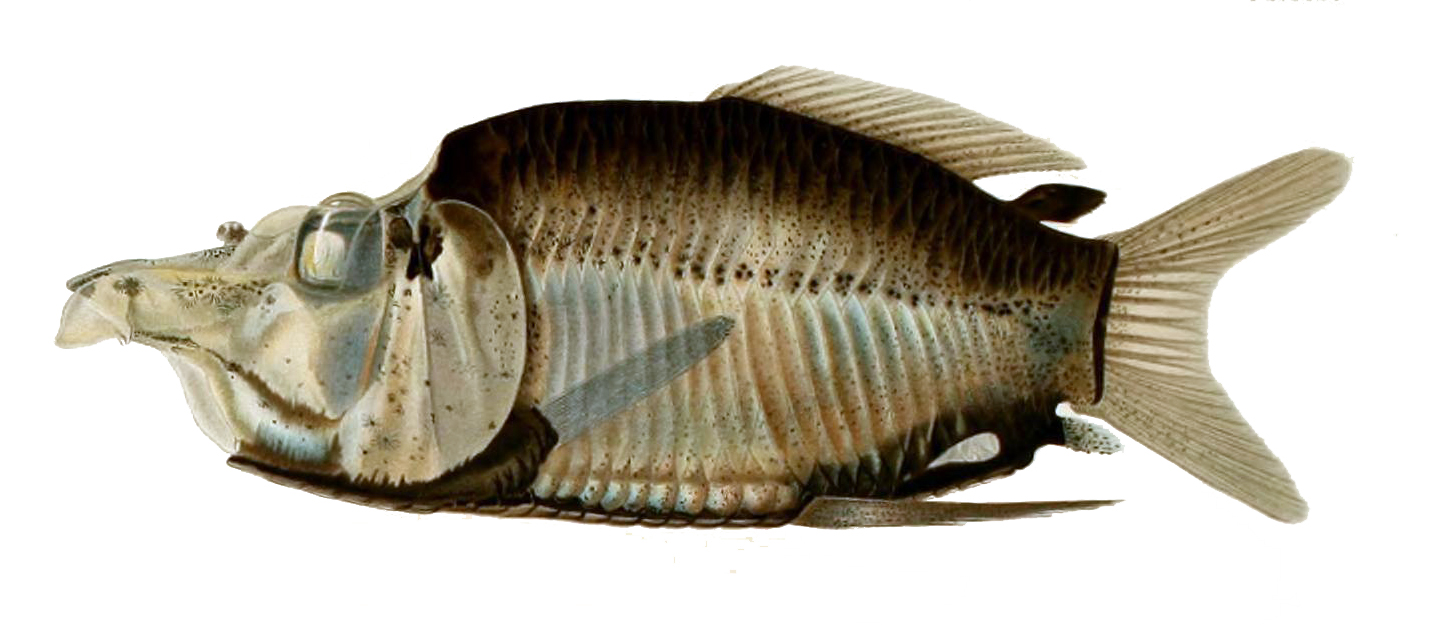
- Monacoa grimaldii
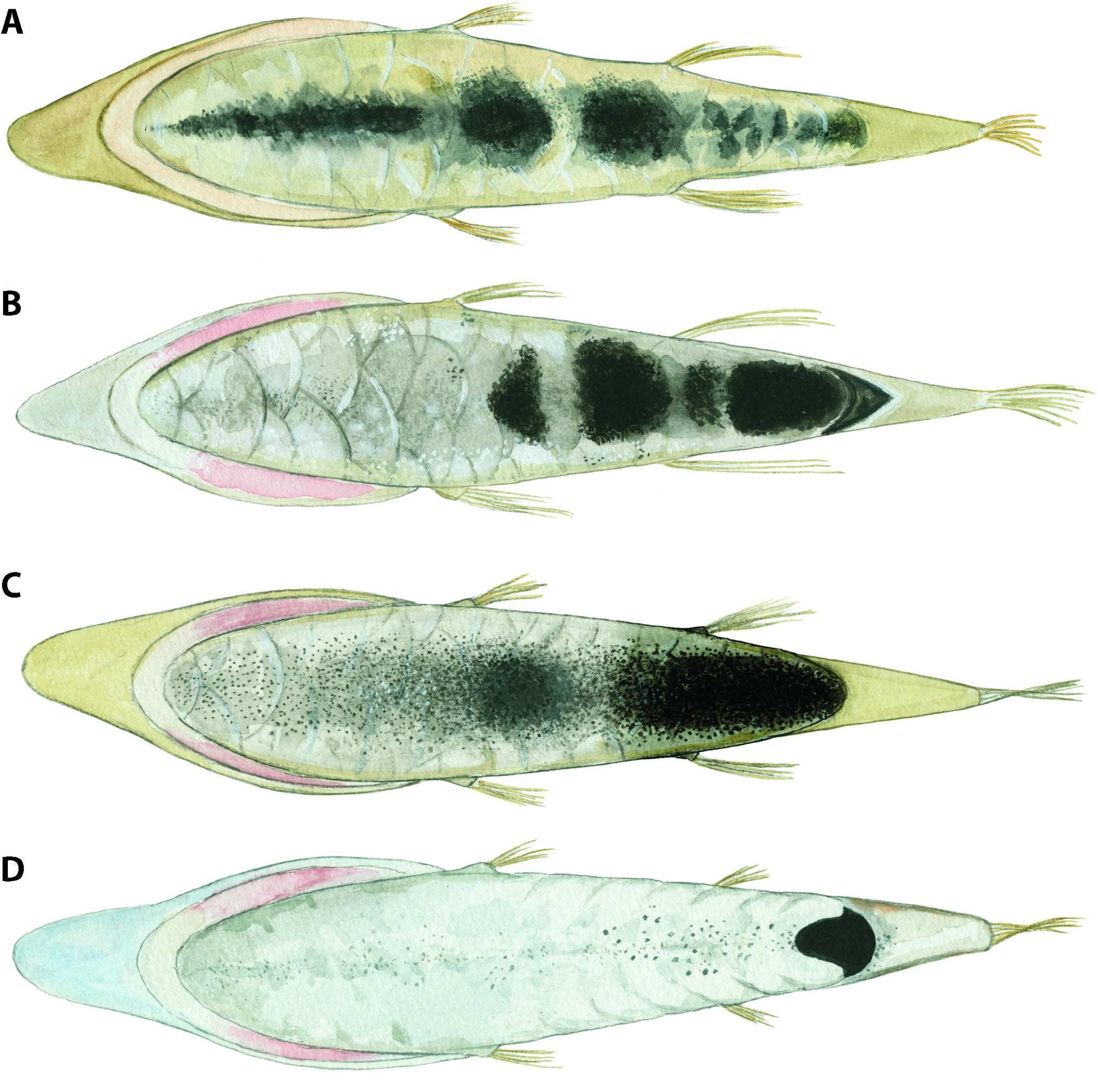
- The "sole" is useful in identifying the different Monacoa species

Scientific classification
- Kingdom: Animalia
- Phylum: Chordata
- Class: Actinopterygii
- Order: Argentiniformes
- Family: Opisthoproctidae
- Genus: Monacoa; Whitley, 1943

Type species
- Opisthoproctus grimaldii Zugmayer, 1911

= Monacoa =

Genus of fishes

Monacoa is a genus of fish in the family Opisthoproctidae found in Atlantic and Pacific Oceans. They are also known as long-nosed mirrorbellies or mirrorbelly spookfish, in reference to the bioluminescent organ in their intestines. The largest species, Monacoa grimaldii, can grow to 8 cm (3.1 in) standard length.

== Species ==
Until 2016, Monacoa was thought to be a synonym of Opisthoproctus, but in 2016 the name was resurrected and it was determined that there are 3 distinct species in the genus. Monacoa griseus and Monacoa niger are distinguished from M. grimaldii due to differences in the pigmentation of their "soles". An examination of their complete mitochondrial genomes further proves the species are distinct.

There are currently 3 recognized species in this genus:

- Monacoa grimaldii (Zugmayer, 1911) (mirrorbelly) [B]
- Monacoa griseus J. Y. Poulsen, Sado, C. Hahn, Byrkjedal, Moku & Miya, 2016 (grey mirrorbelly) [C & D]
- Monacoa niger J. Y. Poulsen, Sado, C. Hahn, Byrkjedal, Moku & Miya, 2016 (black mirrorbelly) [A]
