= Leuciscus merzbacheri =

Conservation status
- Vulnerable (IUCN 3.1)

Scientific classification
- Kingdom: Animalia
- Phylum: Chordata
- Class: Actinopterygii
- Order: Cypriniformes
- Family: Leuciscidae
- Subfamily: Leuciscinae
- Genus: Leuciscus
- Species: L. merzbacheri

Binomial name
- Leuciscus merzbacheri (Zugmayer, 1912)

Synonyms
- Aspiopsis merzbacheri Zugmayer, 1912

Species of fish

Leuciscus merzbacheri, or the Zhungarian ide, is a species of freshwater ray-finned fish belonging to the family Leuciscidae. This fish is found in the Junggar basin in Xinjiang, China.
