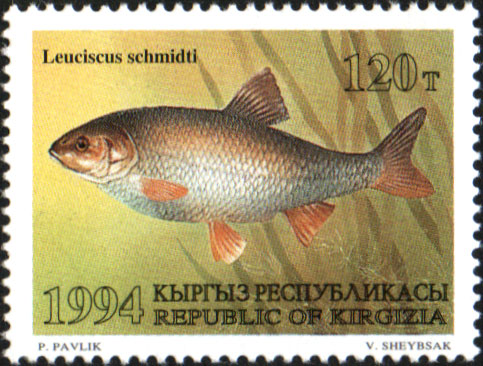
- Stamp of Kyrgyzstan: Leuciscus schmidti

Conservation status
- Vulnerable (IUCN 3.1)

Scientific classification
- Kingdom: Animalia
- Phylum: Chordata
- Class: Actinopterygii
- Order: Cypriniformes
- Family: Leuciscidae
- Genus: Leuciscus
- Species: L. schmidti

Binomial name
- Leuciscus schmidti (Herzenstein, 1896)

Synonyms
- Squalius schmidti Herzenstein, 1896

= Schmidt's dace =

Species of fish

Schmidt's dace (Leuciscus schmidti) is a species of freshwater ray-finned fish belonging to the family Leuciscidae. This species is endemic to Issyk-kul Lake in Kyrgyzstan.
