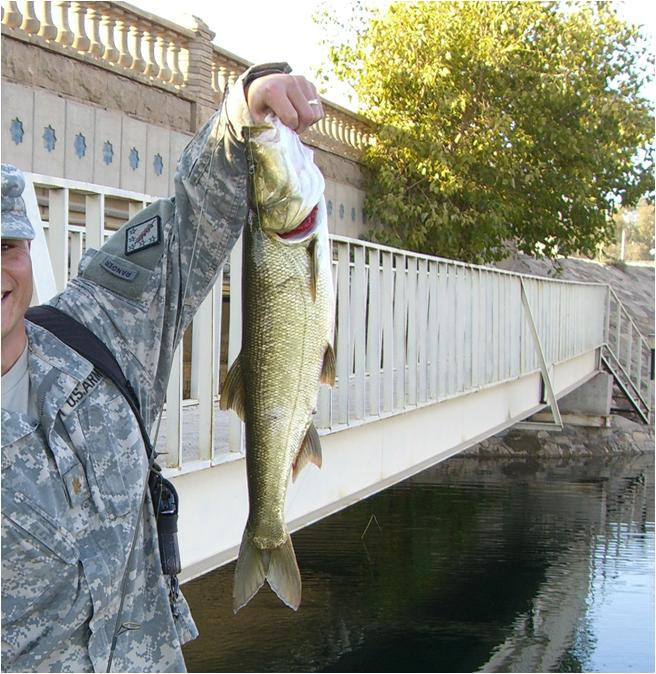

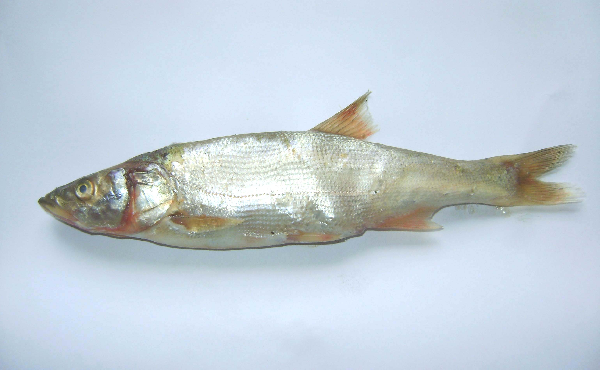

Conservation status
- Least Concern (IUCN 3.1)

Scientific classification
- Kingdom: Animalia
- Phylum: Chordata
- Class: Actinopterygii
- Order: Cypriniformes
- Family: Leuciscidae
- Subfamily: Leuciscinae
- Genus: Leuciscus
- Species: L. vorax

Binomial name
- Leuciscus vorax (Heckel, 1843)

Synonyms
- Aspius vorax Heckel, 1843

= Leuciscus vorax =

Species of fish

Leuciscus vorax, sometimes known as the Tigris asp or Mesopotamian asp, is a species of freshwater ray-finned fish belonging to the family Leuciscidae. This species is found in the Tigris-Euphrates basin and Orontes River in Iran, Iraq, Syria, and Turkey.
