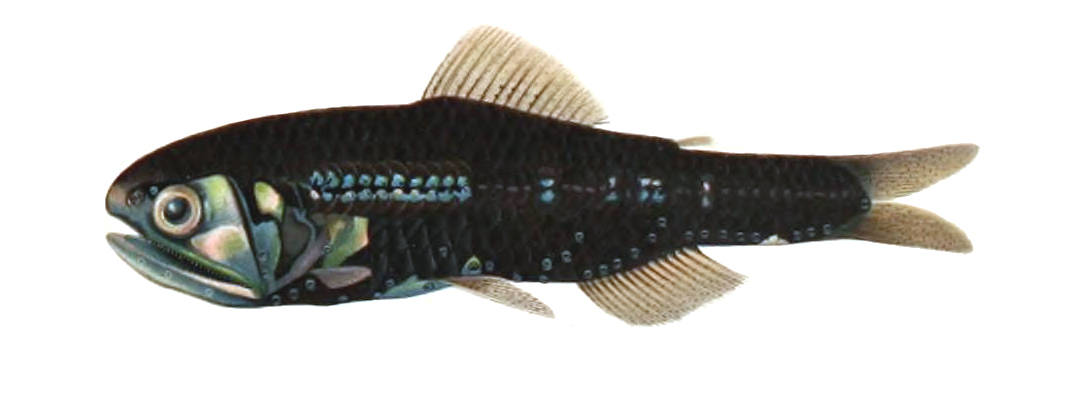
- Lobianchia gemellarii
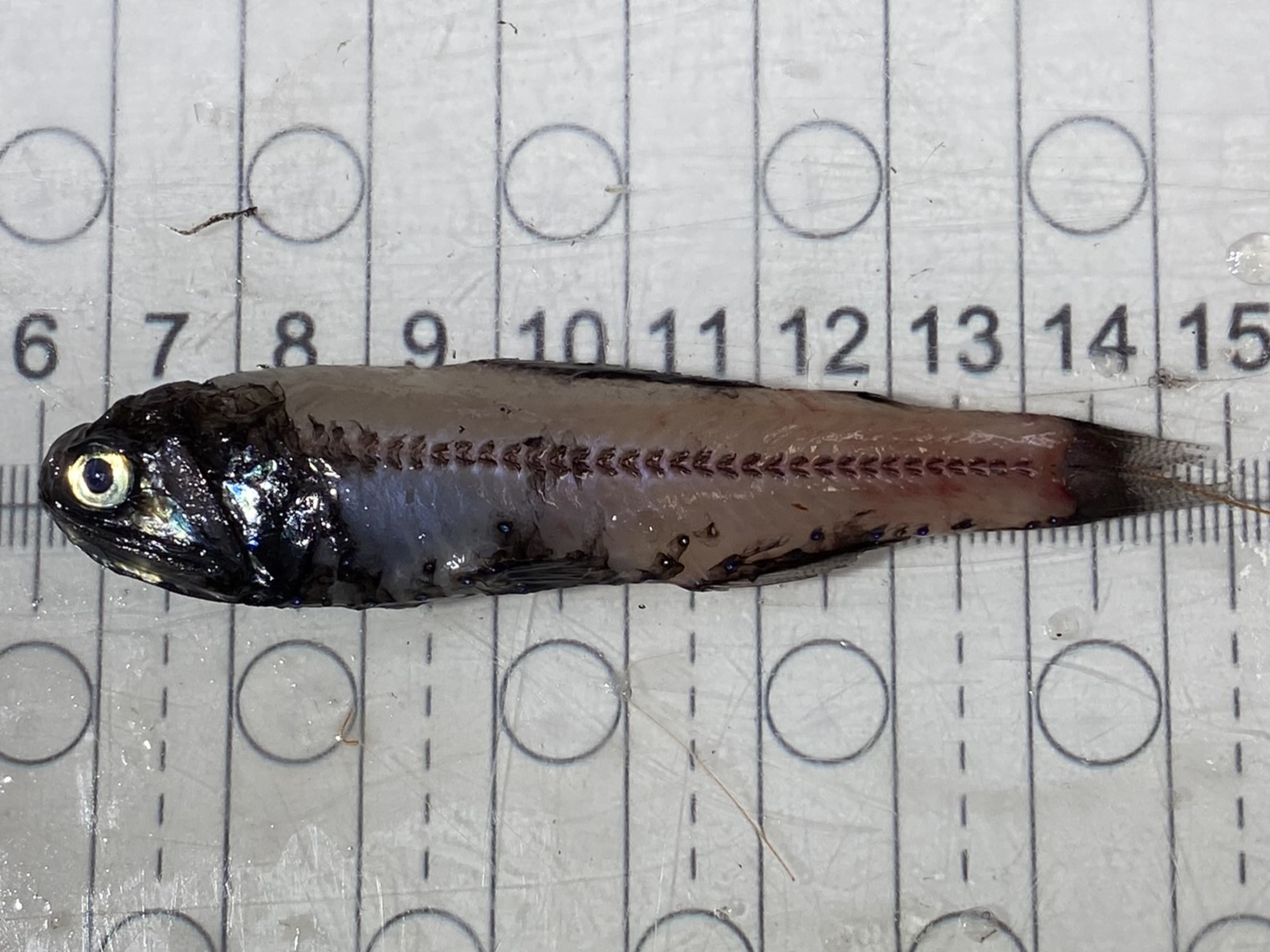

Conservation status
- Least Concern (IUCN 3.1)

Scientific classification
- Kingdom: Animalia
- Phylum: Chordata
- Class: Actinopterygii
- Order: Myctophiformes
- Family: Myctophidae
- Genus: Lobianchia
- Species: L. gemellarii

Binomial name
- Lobianchia gemellarii (Cocco, 1838)

Synonyms
- Nyctophus gemellarii Cocco, 1838; Diaphus gemellari Cocco, 1838; Diaphus gemellarii Cocco, 1838; Diaphus nipponensis Gilbert, 1913; Lampanyctus gemellari Cocco, 1838; Lebianchia gemellari Cocco, 1838; Lobiancha gemellarii Cocco, 1838; Lobianchia gemelari Cocco, 1838; Lobianchia gemellari Cocco, 1838; Myctophum gemellari Cocco, 1838; Myctophum gemellarii Cocco, 1838; Nyctophus gemellarii Cocco, 1838; Scopelus gemellari Cocco, 1838; Scopelus gemellarii Cocco, 1838; Scopelus uraeoclampusuracoclampus Facciolà, 1884; Scopelus uraeoclampus Facciolà, 1884

= Cocco's lantern fish =

Species of fish

Cocco's lantern fish (Lobianchia gemellarii), also called Gemellar's lanternfish, is a species of lanternfish.

== Etymology ==
The fish is named in honor of Italian geologist Carlo Gemellaro (1787–1866).

== Description ==
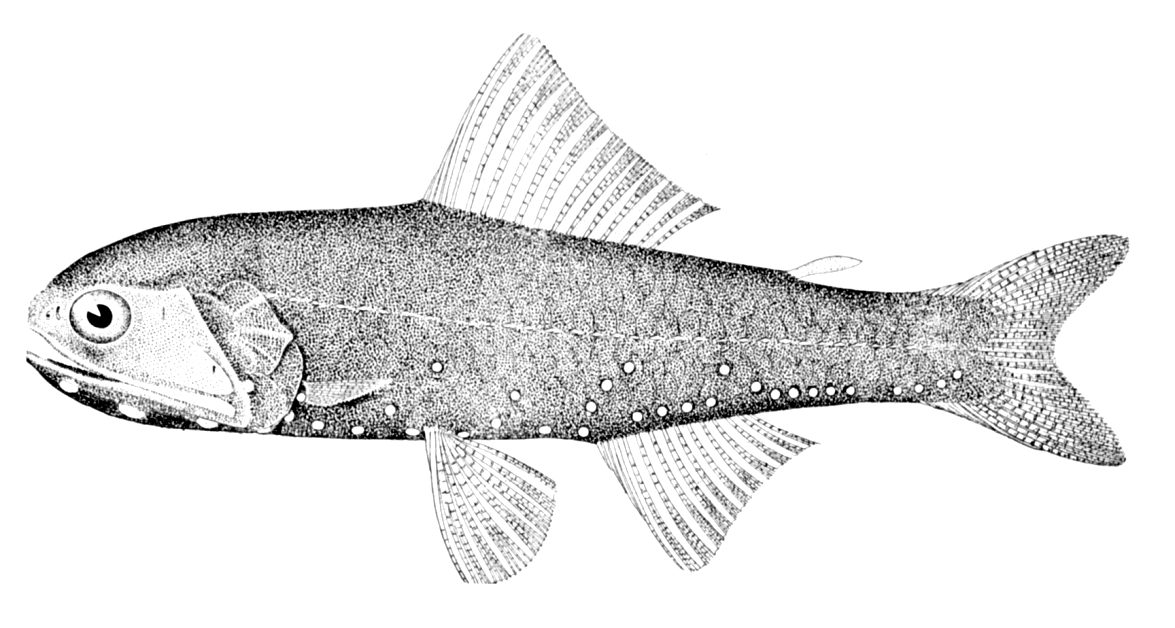
Lobianchia gemellarii

Cocco's lantern fish's maximum length is 6.0 cm (2.4 in). It has 16–18 dorsal soft rays and 13–15 anal soft rays. Males have a supracaudal gland, while females have an infracaudal luminous gland made of two heart-shaped scales, flanked by smaller, triangular luminous scales. It has photophores and a lateral line.

== Habitat ==
Cocco's lantern fish is bathypelagic and oceanodromous, living at depths of 25–800 m (82–2,625 ft) in non-polar seas worldwide.

== Behaviour ==
Cocco's lantern fish are oviparous, with planktonic eggs and larvae.
