= Leuciscus oxianus =

Scientific classification
- Kingdom: Animalia
- Phylum: Chordata
- Class: Actinopterygii
- Order: Cypriniformes
- Family: Leuciscidae
- Genus: Leuciscus
- Species: L. oxianus

Binomial name
- Leuciscus oxianus (Kessler, 1877)

Synonyms
- Idus oxianus Kessler, 1877; Squalius oxianus Kessler, 1877

Species of fish

Leuciscus oxianus is a species of freshwater ray-finned fish belonging to the family Leuciscidae. This fish is endemic to the basin of the Amu Darya River in Central Asia.
