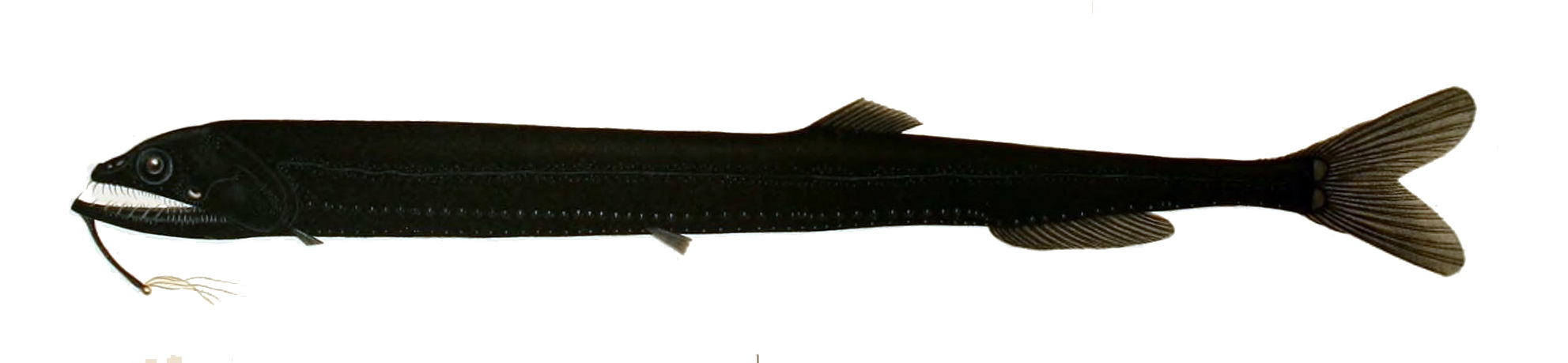

Scientific classification
- Domain: Eukaryota
- Kingdom: Animalia
- Phylum: Chordata
- Class: Actinopterygii
- Order: Stomiiformes
- Family: Stomiidae
- Subfamily: Astronesthinae
- Genus: Rhadinesthes; Regan & Trewavas, 1929
- Species: R. decimus

Binomial name
- Rhadinesthes decimus (Zugmayer, 1911)

= Rhadinesthes =

Species of fish

Rhadinesthes decimus, the slender snaggletooth, is a species of barbeled dragonfish found in the ocean depths reaching to 4,900 metres (16,100 ft). This species grows to a length of 41.0 centimetres (16.1 in) SL. This species is the only known species in its genus.
