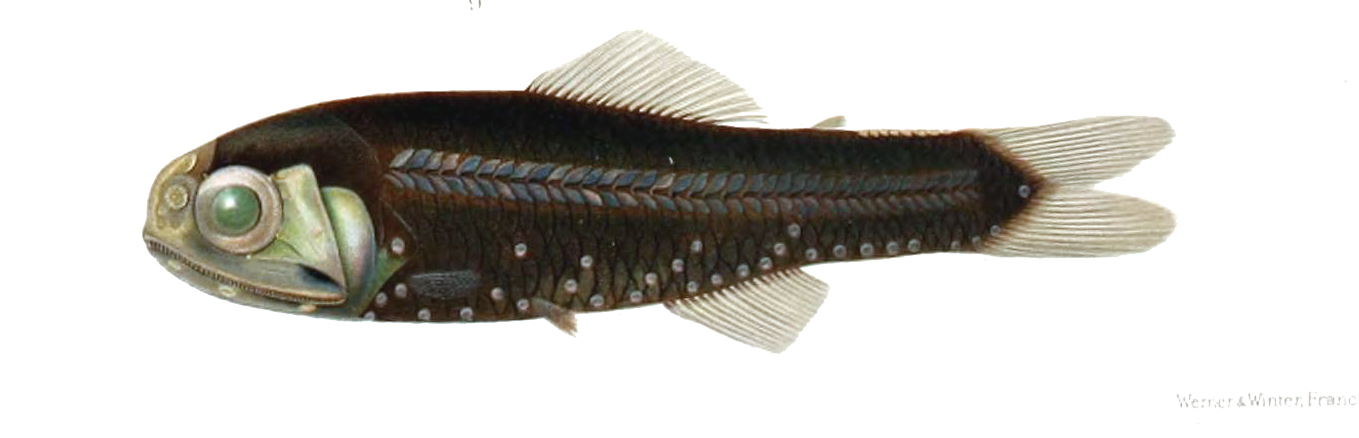
- Dofleini's lanternfish

Conservation status
- Least Concern (IUCN 3.1)

Scientific classification
- Kingdom: Animalia
- Phylum: Chordata
- Class: Actinopterygii
- Order: Myctophiformes
- Family: Myctophidae
- Genus: Lobianchia
- Species: L. dofleini

Binomial name
- Lobianchia dofleini (Zugmayer, 1911)

Synonyms
- List: Myctophum dofleini Zugmayer, 1911; Diaphus dofleini (Zugmayer, 1911); Lampanyctus dofleini (Zugmayer, 1911); Scopelus dofleini (Zugmayer, 1911); Lobianchia dolfeni (Zugmayer, 1911); Lobianchia dolfleini (Zugmayer, 1911)

= Lobianchia dofleini =

Species of fish

Lobianchia dofleini, also known as Dofleini's lantern fish, is a species of lanternfish. It is found in the Atlantic Ocean.

== Etymology ==
The species name for this fish is named in honor of zoologist Franz Doflein (1873–1924), of LMU Munich, who was the one who recommended Zugmayer for the job of the study of fishes obtained by the Princesse-Alice of Monaco (1901–1910).

== Size ==
This species reaches a length of 5.0 cm (2.0 in).
