= Leuciscus lindbergi =

Conservation status
- Endangered (IUCN 3.1)

Scientific classification
- Kingdom: Animalia
- Phylum: Chordata
- Class: Actinopterygii
- Order: Cypriniformes
- Family: Leuciscidae
- Subfamily: Leuciscinae
- Genus: Leuciscus
- Species: L. lindbergi

Binomial name
- Leuciscus lindbergi Zanin & Eremejev, 1934

Species of fish

Leuciscus lindbergi is a species of freshwater ray-finned fish belonging to the family Leuciscidae. This fish is endemic to the endorheic basins of the Talas and Ters Rivers in Kazakhstan and Kyrgyzstan.
