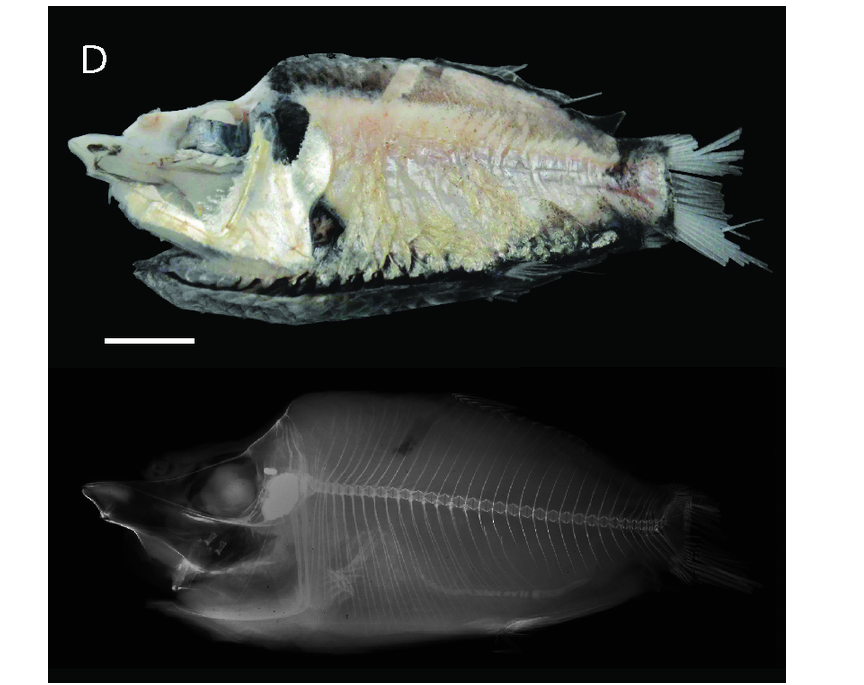
- Holotype
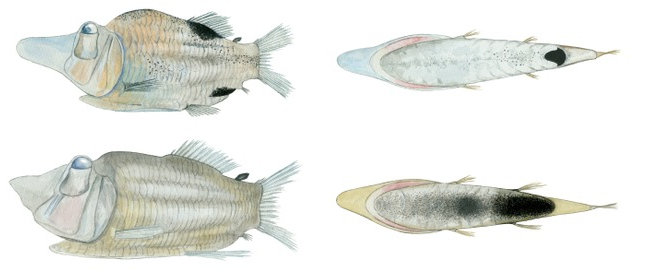
- Top: juvenile; Right: sole pigmentation

Scientific classification
- Kingdom: Animalia
- Phylum: Chordata
- Class: Actinopterygii
- Division: Teleostei
- Order: Argentiniformes
- Family: Opisthoproctidae
- Genus: Monacoa
- Species: M. griseus

Binomial name
- Monacoa griseus J. Y. Poulsen, Sado, C. Hahn, Byrkjedal, Moku & Miya, 2016

= Monacoa griseus =

Species of fish

Monacoa griseus, also known as the grey mirrorbelly, is a species of fish in the family Opisthoproctidae. It is found in the south-western Pacific Ocean.

== Description ==
This species reaches a maximum length of 6.4 cm (2.5 in). Its habitat is based in the southwest Pacific surrounding New Zealand, with some possibility of reaching the water near Australia.
