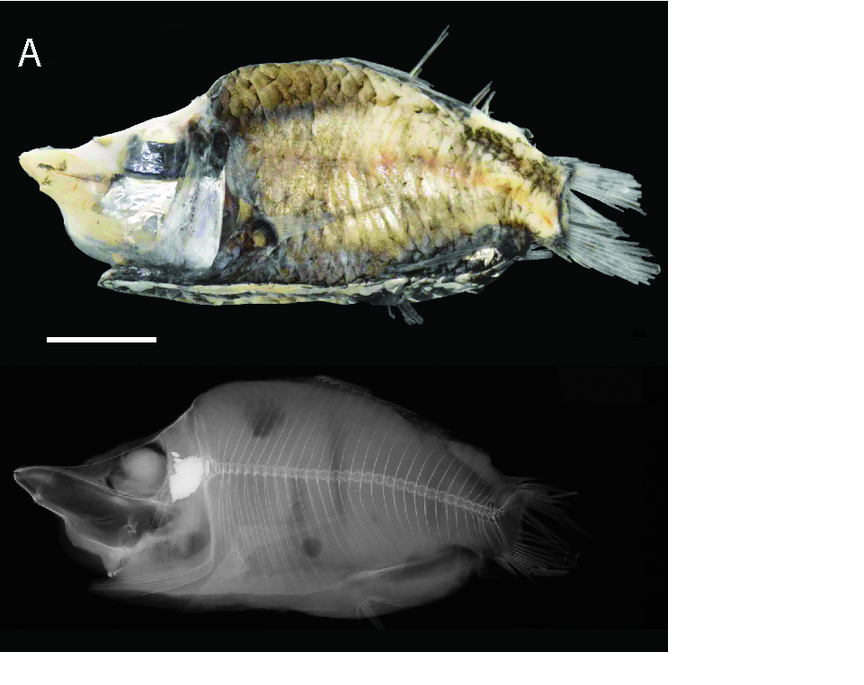
- Holotype

Scientific classification
- Kingdom: Animalia
- Phylum: Chordata
- Class: Actinopterygii
- Order: Argentiniformes
- Family: Opisthoproctidae
- Genus: Monacoa
- Species: M. niger

Binomial name
- Monacoa niger J. Y. Poulsen, Sado, C. Hahn, Byrkjedal, Moku & Miya, 2016

= Monacoa niger =

Species of fish

Monacoa niger, also known as the black mirrorbelly, is a species of fish in the family Opisthoproctidae. It is mainly found in the eastern-central Pacific Ocean.

== Description ==
This species reaches a length of 4.8 cm (1.9 in).
