= Zeravshan dace =

Conservation status
- Least Concern (IUCN 3.1)

Scientific classification
- Kingdom: Animalia
- Phylum: Chordata
- Class: Actinopterygii
- Order: Cypriniformes
- Family: Leuciscidae
- Subfamily: Leuciscinae
- Genus: Leuciscus
- Species: L. lehmanni

Binomial name
- Leuciscus lehmanni J. F. Brandt, 1852

Synonyms
- Squalius intermedius Kessler, 1872; Leuciscus angrenicus N. P. Serov, 1941

Species of fish

The Zeravshan dace (Leuciscus lehmanni) is a species of freshwater is a species of freshwater ray-finned fish belonging to the family Leuciscidae. This species is found in Afghanistan and Uzbekistan.
