= Leuciscus chuanchicus =

Conservation status
- Least Concern (IUCN 3.1)

Scientific classification
- Kingdom: Animalia
- Phylum: Chordata
- Class: Actinopterygii
- Order: Cypriniformes
- Family: Leuciscidae
- Subfamily: Leuciscinae
- Genus: Leuciscus
- Species: L. chuanchicus

Binomial name
- Leuciscus chuanchicus (Kessler, 1876)

Synonyms
- Squalius chuanchicus Kessler, 1876; Squalius mongolicus Kessler, 1876; Leuciscus waleckii suiyuani Mori, 1941

Species of fish

Leuciscus chuanchicus is a species of ray-finned fish in the genus Leuciscus which is endemic to China where it occurs in the upper reaches of the Yellow River.
