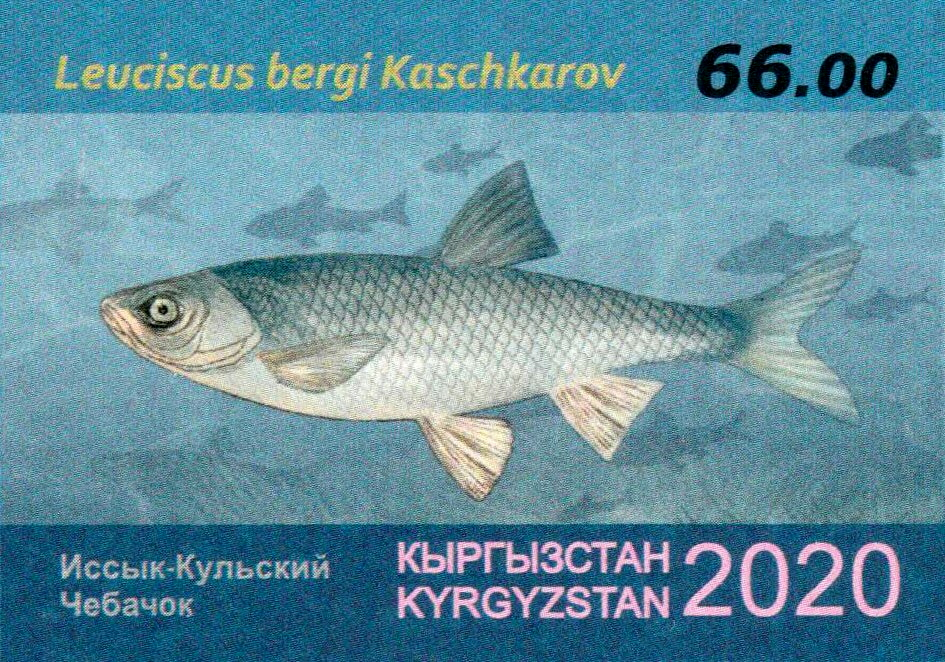

Conservation status
- Vulnerable (IUCN 3.1)

Scientific classification
- Kingdom: Animalia
- Phylum: Chordata
- Class: Actinopterygii
- Order: Cypriniformes
- Family: Leuciscidae
- Subfamily: Leuciscinae
- Genus: Leuciscus
- Species: L. bergi

Binomial name
- Leuciscus bergi Kashkarov, 1925

= Issyk-Kul dace =

Species of fish

Issyk-Kul dace (Leuciscus bergi) is a species of freshwater ray-finned fish belonging to the family Leuciscidae. This species is endemic to Issyk-Kul Lake and its drainage in Kyrgyzstan.
