= Leuciscus latus =

Conservation status
- Data Deficient (IUCN 3.1)

Scientific classification
- Kingdom: Animalia
- Phylum: Chordata
- Class: Actinopterygii
- Order: Cypriniformes
- Family: Leuciscidae
- Subfamily: Leuciscinae
- Genus: Leuciscus
- Species: L. latus

Binomial name
- Leuciscus latus (Keyserling, 1861)

Synonyms
- Squalius latus Keyserling, 1861; Squalius transcaspiensis Berg, 1898

Species of fish

Leuciscus latus is a species of freshwater ray-finned fish belonging to the family Leuciscidae. This species is known from a single specimen collected in 1861 in Afghanistan, which has subsequently been lost.
