= Leuciscus dzungaricus =

Conservation status
- Data Deficient (IUCN 3.1)

Scientific classification
- Kingdom: Animalia
- Phylum: Chordata
- Class: Actinopterygii
- Order: Cypriniformes
- Family: Leuciscidae
- Subfamily: Leuciscinae
- Genus: Leuciscus
- Species: L. dzungaricus

Binomial name
- Leuciscus dzungaricus Paepke & F. Koch, 1998

Species of fish

Leuciscus dzungaricus is a species of freshwater ray-finned fish belonging to the family Leuciscidae. This species This species is found in the Bulgan Gol river in Mongolia, it may also occur in the Irtysh river in China.
