= Siberian dace =

Conservation status
- Least Concern (IUCN 3.1)

Scientific classification
- Kingdom: Animalia
- Phylum: Chordata
- Class: Actinopterygii
- Order: Cypriniformes
- Family: Leuciscidae
- Subfamily: Leuciscinae
- Genus: Leuciscus
- Species: L. baicalensis

Binomial name
- Leuciscus baicalensis (Dybowski, 1874)

Synonyms
- Squalidus baicalensis Dybowski, 1874; Squalius suworzewi Warpachowski, 1889

Species of fish

The Siberian dace (Leuciscus baicalensis) is a species of freshwater ray-finned fish belonging to the family Leuciscidae. This fish is found in Siberian rivers draining to the Arctic Ocean, from the Ob to the Kolyma in the east, as well as in Mongolia and in Ulungur Lake and Ulungur River in Xinjiang, China.

The complete mitochondrial genome of Leuciscus baicalensis has a mostly conserved structural organization and it is 16,606 bp in size. It consisted of 37 genes (13 protein-coding genes, 22 transfer RNA genes and 2 ribosomal RNA genes), and 2 main non-coding regions (the control region and the origin of the light strand replication).
