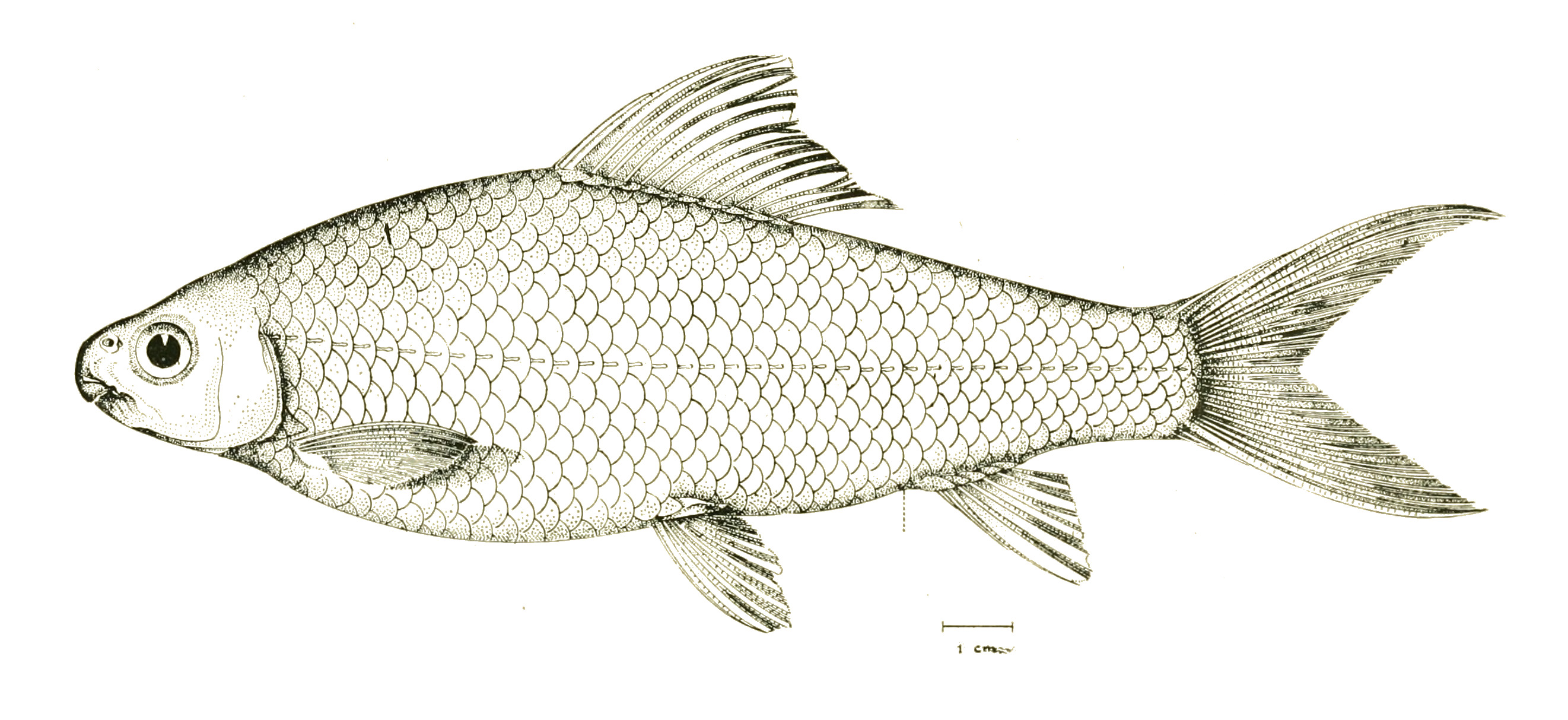

Conservation status
- Near Threatened (IUCN 3.1)

Scientific classification
- Kingdom: Animalia
- Phylum: Chordata
- Class: Actinopterygii
- Order: Cypriniformes
- Suborder: Cyprinoidei
- Family: Cyprinidae
- Genus: Disymphia; Endruweit, 2025
- Species: D. molitorella

Binomial name
- Disymphia molitorella (Valenciennes, 1844)

Synonyms
- Leuciscus molitorella Valenciennes, 1844; Labeo molitorella (Valenciennes, 1844); Leuciscus chevanella Valenciennes, 1844; Cirrhinus chinensis Günther, 1868; Labeo garnieri Sauvage, 1884; Labeo jordani Oshima, 1919; Cirrhinus melanostigma Fowler & Bean, 1922; Labeo melanostigma (Fowler & Bean, 1922); Labeo collaris Nichols & Pope, 1927; Labeo pingi Wu, 1931

= Disymphia =

Mud carp

Species of fish

Disymphia molitorella (mud carp or dace) is a species of ray-finned fish in a monospecific genus found mainly in southern China and Vietnam.

== History ==
The mud carp is a native Asian freshwater fish with a broad distribution from the Mekong River to the Pearl River deltas, inhabiting lakes, rivers and reservoirs.

Mud carp cultivation was introduced to China during the Tang dynasty (618–907 AD) as a substitute for common carp, as the common carp was forbidden to fish due to a ban. Chinese aquaculture farmers adapted by raising mud carp, which were bottom feeders, in polyculture with top-feeding grass carp, while silver carp or bighead carp lived and fed in the middle depths.

== Habitat ==
Mud carp is typically a subtropical fish. The mud carp is found in the mud and Mekong River and Pearl River delta, as well as bodies of freshwater along these two rivers. In China's Guangdong province and Guangxi autonomous region, mud carp makes up about 30% of the freshwater fish population.

The fish has been introduced to Indonesia, Singapore, Japan, Taiwan, and Hong Kong.

Within China the fish is raised on fish farms.

== Dispersion ==
The mud carp is native to Southern China and parts of Mainland Southeast Asia. It is present in major river systems such as the Pearl River, Red River (China/Vietnam), Mekong River, and Chao Phraya River.

== Diet ==
Mud carp is an omnivore and mainly consumes water plants or insects. Farm raised carp are fed pellets.

== Culinary use ==
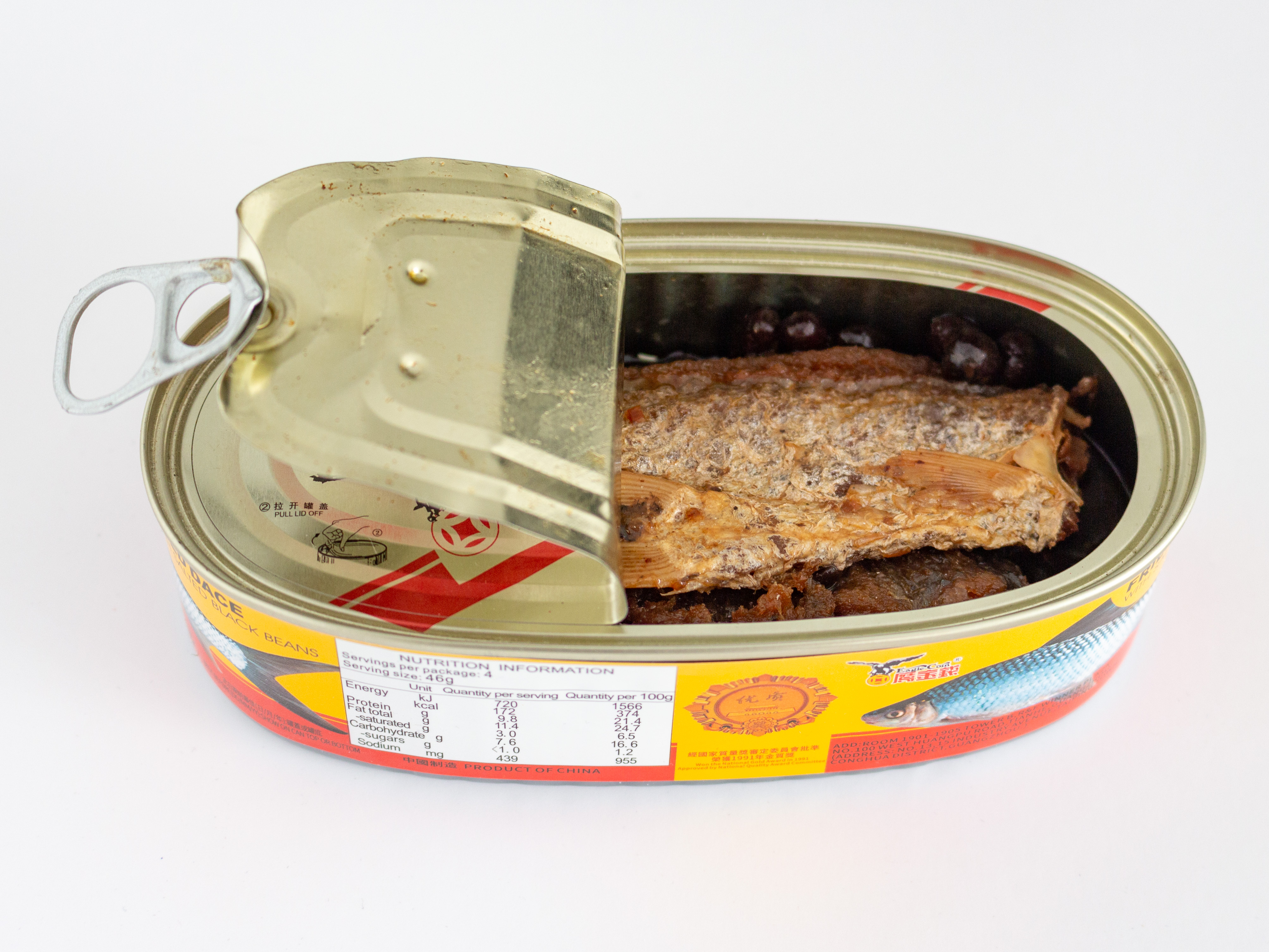
Fried dace with salted black beans

Due to low cost of production, the fish is mainly consumed by the poor and locally consumed; it is mostly sold live and eaten fresh, but can be dried and salted. Increased fishing has threatened wild populations of mud carp.

The fish is sometimes canned (typically as fried dace with salted black beans) or processed as fish cakes, fish balls or dumplings. They can be found for retail sale within China and throughout the Chinese diaspora. Canned dace from China has periodically been found to carry traces of malachite green, a carcinogenic antimicrobial banned for use in food.

== See also ==
- Dace
- Common carp

== Bibliography ==
- Froese, Rainer; Pauly, Daniel (eds.). "Cirrhinus molitorella". FishBase.
- Rath, Rajendra Kumar (2011). Freshwater aquaculture (3rd revised and enlarged ed.). Scientific Publishers (India). ISBN 978-81-7233-694-3. OCLC 1138534747.
- Freshwater aquaculture development in China (Technical report). FAO Fisheries Technical Paper. Vol. 215 (published 1983). 22 April – 20 May 1980. ISBN 92-5-101113-3. OCLC 10455698.
- Fagan, Brian (2017). Fishing: How the sea fed civilization. Yale University Press. ISBN 978-0-300-21534-2. OCLC 978291325.
