= Fried dace with salted black beans =

Canned food of Chinese origin

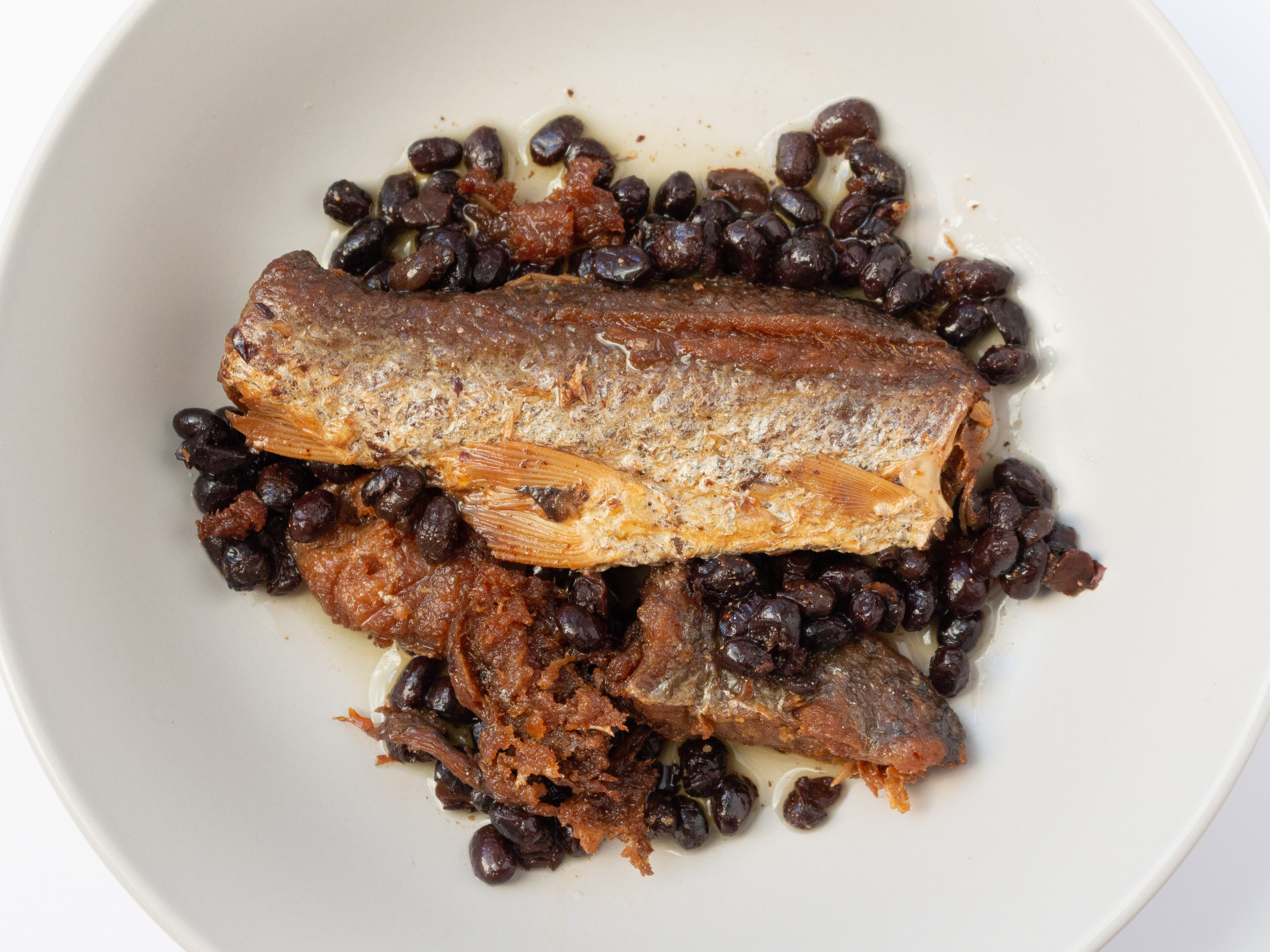
- Fried dace with salted black beans on a plate
- Traditional Chinese: 豆豉鯪魚
- Simplified Chinese: 豆豉鲮鱼
Transcriptions
Standard Mandarin
- Hanyu Pinyin: dòuchǐ língyú
- IPA: /tôu.ʈʂʰɻ̩̀ lǐŋ.jy̌/
Yue: Cantonese
- Yale Romanization: dauhsih lèhng’yú
- Jyutping: dau6 si6 leng4 jyu2
- IPA: /tɐ̀u.sìː lɛ̭ːŋ.jy̌ː/

Fried dace with salted black beans is a canned food of Chinese origin. Cirrhinus molitorella (dace) is a fish from the Pearl River in China. ‘Dace’ is a trade name of Cirrhinus molitorella while ‘salted black beans’ refers to fermented black soybeans known as “dau si” (豆豉) in Cantonese. Fried dace with salted black beans is made by combining dace with salted black beans and preserving it in oil afterwards.

== History ==
Fried dace with salted black beans originated in Guangzhou, Guangdong in China. Before the industrialisation of China began in the 1950s, many Chinese from the Pearl River Delta region needed to go to Southeast Asia for work. They would fry the dace, preserve it with salted black beans and bring it with them because they were not used to eating foreign food. This tradition gradually transformed into a canned food business. The first canned fried dace with salted black beans was produced by Guangzhou Guangmaoxiang Canned Food Factory in China in 1893. This factory was evolved from “广奇香罐头厂” (the Guang Qi Xiang Guan Tou Factory), which was registered in 1912 in Hong Kong.

Around the 1960s, most people in Hong Kong did not have a good living environment or family circumstances. They had low incomes and low purchasing power. Due to its low price, long shelf life, and its strong taste, which allows it to be served with rice alone, canned fried dace with salted black beans became a very common food for meals. Sometimes, it would be cooked at home, which added warmth and nostalgic value to this dish. Fried dace with salted black beans was a collective memory for many people in Hong Kong.

Fried dace with salted black beans has always been popular among the lower and middle-income groups. In the 1990s, low-income households had to limit their expenditure on food. They could still afford to buy fried dace with salted black beans.

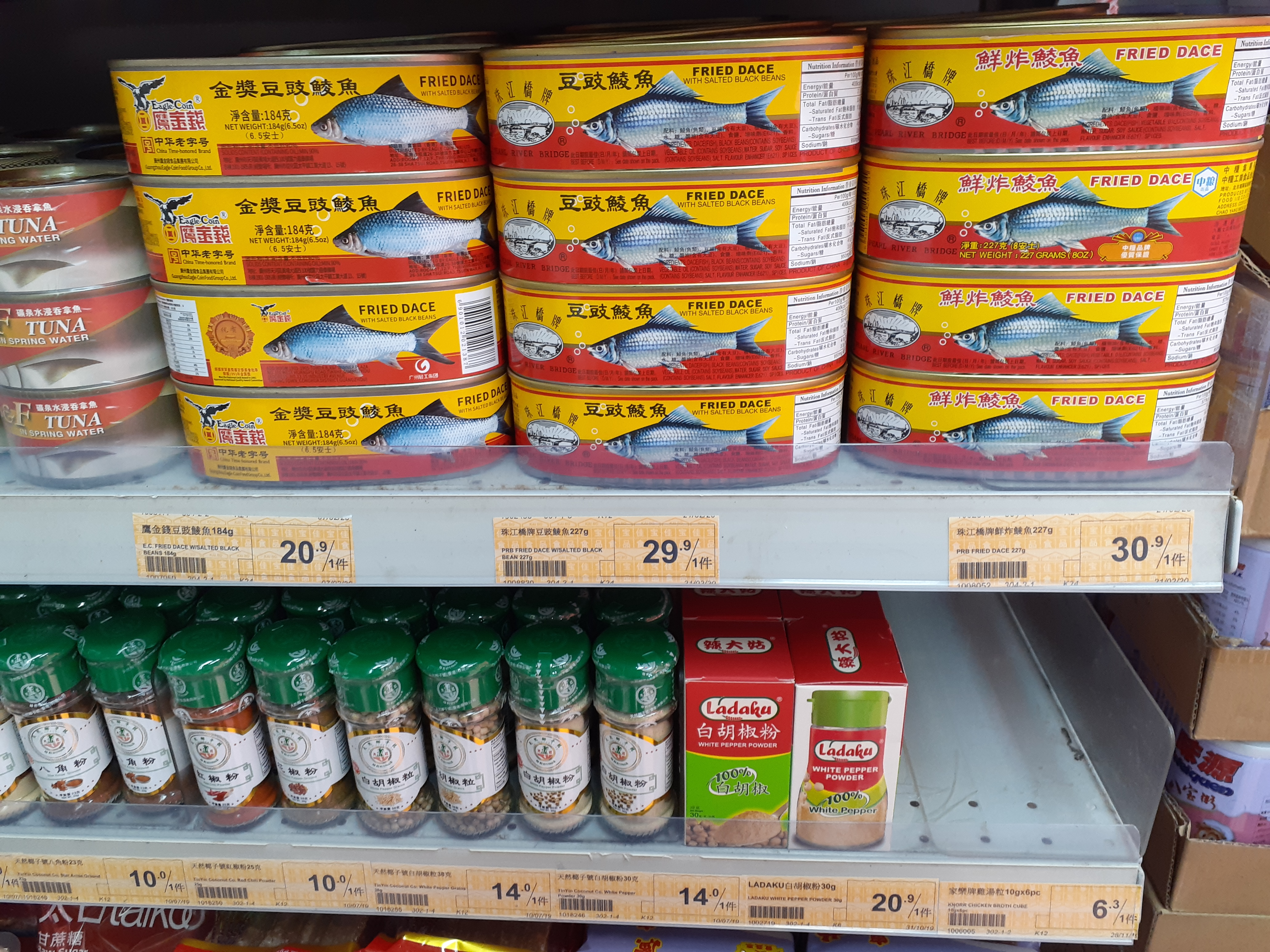
Sold at a store in Hong Kong

Furthermore, middle-income households would also use it during emergencies (e.g. when strong typhoon signals are in force or during tropical rainstorms which prevent people from going out to eat). Even though people can afford to buy more nutritious foods after the economic boom in the 1970s, people from different financial backgrounds will also consume this kind of canned food due to its convenience and cheap prices.

== Ingredients and taste ==
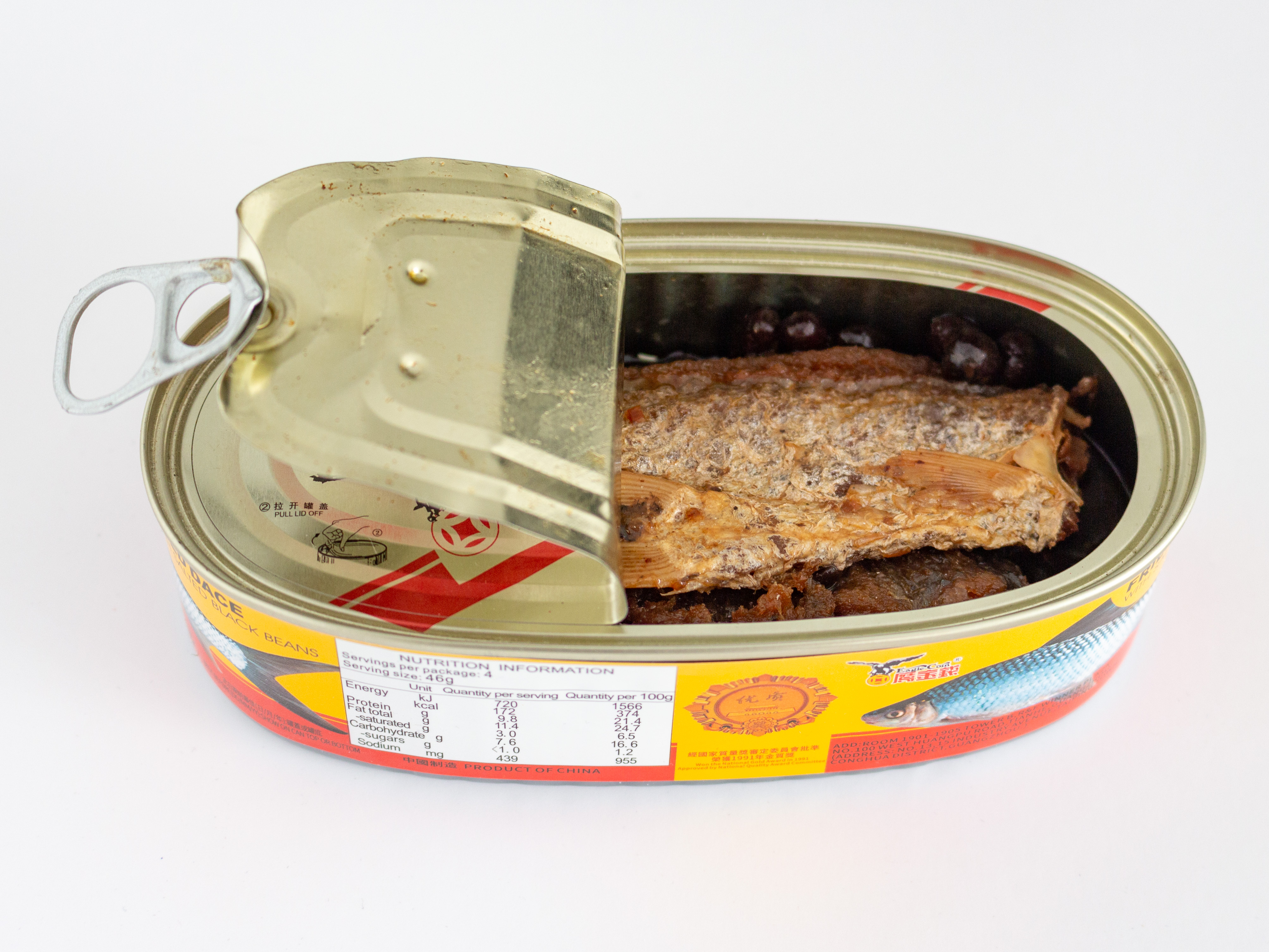
Fried dace with salted black beans is commonly packaged in an oval-shaped tin can

There are seven essential ingredients in the canned product; fresh dace, salted black beans, vegetable oil, sugar, soybean sauce, salt and spices. It is very salty, with a slight burnt smoky taste from the black beans. The dace, preserved in vegetable oil, has a chewy texture with soft, edible bones inside. It has strong umami with black beans and savory spices.

== Preparation and serving ==
Fried dace with salted black beans can be eaten cold straight out of the can or heated before being served. Other classic ways are eating with stir-fried green vegetables, noodles or plain white rice.

== Health hazards and contamination ==
In 2005, the Hong Kong Food and Environmental Hygiene Department tested 26 samples of food, in which some of the samples of the canned fried dace with salted black beans were tested positive for malachite green, a carcinogenic chemical. Trace quantities of malachite green were found again in 2015, 2016, 2017 and 2019, though a government spokesman assured consumers that the levels were unlikely to be harmful under normal circumstances. The United States Food and Drug Administration has detected malachite green intermittently in shipments of canned dace imported from China since 2006, and in 2007 instituted a precautionary halt to imports, though it did not consider the problem significant enough to issue a recall.
