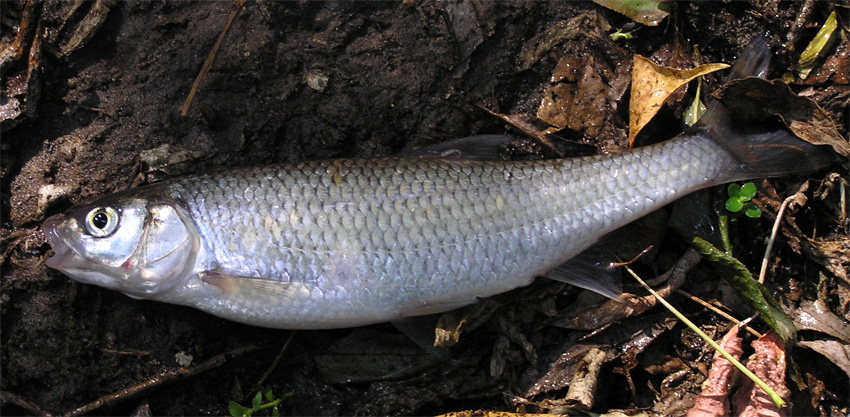

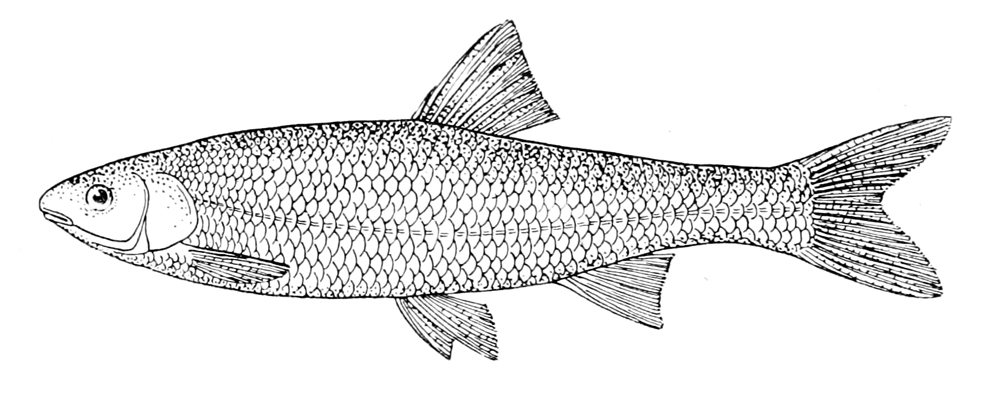

Conservation status
- Least Concern (IUCN 3.1)

Scientific classification
- Kingdom: Animalia
- Phylum: Chordata
- Class: Actinopterygii
- Division: Teleostei
- Order: Cypriniformes
- Family: Leuciscidae
- Subfamily: Leuciscinae
- Genus: Leuciscus
- Species: L. leuciscus

Binomial name
- Leuciscus leuciscus (Linnaeus, 1758)

Synonyms
- List: Cyprinus leuciscus Linnaeus, 1758; Cyprinus dobula Linnaeus, 1758; Cyprinus grislagine Linnaeus, 1758; Cyprinus graining Walbaum, 1792; Cyprinus umbra Walbaum, 1792; Cyprinus graining Bloch & Schneider, 1801; Cyprinus lancastreinsis Shaw, 1804; Cyprinus simus Römer-Büchner, 1827; Leuciscus vulgaris Fleming, 1828; Leuciscus asgenteus Fitzinger, 1832; Leuciscus majalis Agassiz, 1835; Leuciscus rodens Agassiz, 1835; Cyprinus mugilis Vallot, 1837; Leuciscus rostratus Valenciennes, 1844; Leuciscus saltator Bonaparte, 1846; Squalius chalybeus Heckel, 1852; Cyprinus slax Gronow, 1854; Squalius vulgaris var. minor Walecki, 1863; Squalius vulgaris var. robustior, Walecki, 1863; Squalius mehdem, Warpachowski, 1897; Idus stagnatilis Dubalen, 1913; Leuciscus leuciscus roulei Bertin & Estève, 1948

= Common dace =

Species of ray-finned fish

The common dace (Leuciscus leuciscus) is a species of freshwater and brackish water ray-finned fish from the family Leuciscidae which is native to Europe but which has been introduced to other parts of the world. It is a quarry species for coarse anglers.

== Description ==
The common dace differs from other members in the genus Leuciscus found in Europe by its inferior mouth, slightly longer upper jaw which has the tip of the upper lip level with the centre line of the eye and the lack of an obvious snout. It has a yellowish iris and a body which is covered in large silvery scales, the lateral line having 49–52 scales. The anal fin has a concave margin and the caudal fin is forked. The dorsal fin has 2–3 spines and 7–9 soft rays while the anal fin has 3 spines and 8–9 soft rays. The maximum size attained is a total length of 30 centimetres (12 in).

== Distribution ==
The common dace is native to Europe and northern Asia where it occurs in the basins of the North Sea, Baltic Sea, White Sea and Barents Sea. It also occurs in the basin of the Caspian Sea in the drainage systems of the Volga and Ural Rivers and in the Black Sea basin it is found in the Danube and the Dnieper. In France it occurs in the Seine River drainage and in the drainages of the Rhone and Arc which flow into the Mediterranean. In the Danube main river of Romania as well as in Scandinavia north of 69°N and most of central Finland this species has a localised distribution. The populations from Siberia and East Asia are normally assigned to Leuciscus baicalensis and Leuciscus dzungaricus.

This species has been widely introduced in areas of Europe where it did not previously occur. For example, it has become established in Ireland since the early 1900s, having been taken there as a bait fish to catch larger fish such as pike. Following its introduction in Ireland, it has benefited from parasite release, meaning that with its introduction it has lost its normal set of parasites and might thus have a competitive advantage over native species.

== Habitat and biology ==
The common dace is found in rivers and streams, sometime occurring in lakes or in the brackish water at the mouths of rivers. It is a surface dwelling fish which gather in shoals of adults in the lower reaches of rivers and backwaters during the winter. Some adults remain upstream in the spawning grounds all winter as well. At spawning time, in March and April, they migrate up stream to lay their pale yellow eggs on shallow gravel beds in fast flowing streams, the eggs attach to gravel and stones. The juveniles hide among the cavities and roots in the bankside vegetation and as they mature they move into faster flowing water. The main food for common dace is small invertebrates.

== Angling ==
The common dace is fished for by coarse anglers and the British rod caught record is 1.32 pounds (.599 kg). In some parts of Europe it is eaten but it is not highly regarded as a food fish. It is used as bait by anglers and that is thought to be the mechanism by which it was introduced to and spread in Ireland.

== See also ==
- Fried dace with salted black beans, made from a different fish
