= Pierre Moulin du Coudray de La Blanchère =

Pierre Moulin du Coudray de La Blanchère (1821–1880), sometimes known as Henri de La Blanchère, was a French ichthyologist, naturalist and photographer.
