= Erich Zugmayer =

Austrian zoologist

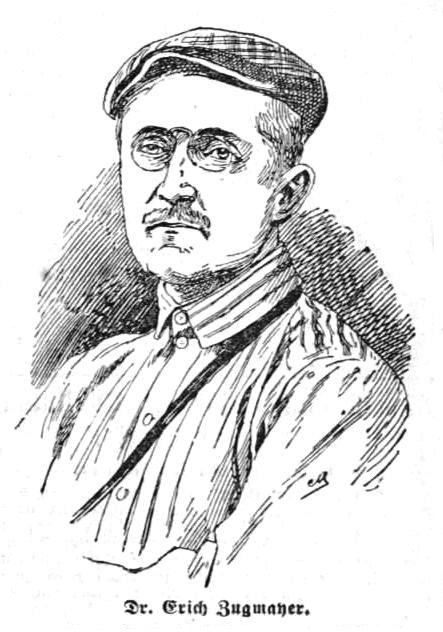
Sketch of Erich Zugmayer

Erich Johann Georg Zugmayer (16 May 1879, Vienna – 13 February 1938) was an Austrian zoologist and ichthyologist who worked in the Austrian foreign ministry. He collected extensively in Asia where he went on several expeditions including Western Tibet (1906) and Baluchistan (1911). He described several new species of fishes and several bird taxa were described from his collections.

== Life and work ==
Zugmayer was born in Vienna to Heinrich Zugmayer (1841-1917, director of the metal-making firm of Zugmayer) and his wife Emilie, née Hoffmann (d. 1926). A cousin was the zoologist Hans Hass (1919-2013). He studied liberal arts before studying commerce in London and working in trade and then gave up to study natural sciences at Heidelberg University from 1900. He was influenced by Otto Bütschli, Theodor Curtius, Curt Herbst, Alfred Hettner, Albrecht Kossel, Friedrich Krafft, Robert Lauterborn, Hermann Karl Rosenbusch, Wilhelm Salomon-Calvi and August Schuberg. His doctoral thesis in 1904 under Bütschli was titled Über Sinnesorgane an den Tentakeln des Genus Cardium. He went to Norway and Lapland in 1899 with his brother Paul and friends, the Caucasus in 1905 (during the Great War his work also involved reconnaissance) and Turkestan in 1906. In 1908 he became head of the State Zoological Museum in Munich and a member of the Bavarian ornithological society. During World War I he was sent along with a diplomatic mission to Persia and Baluchistan where he collected specimens. He served as a consul in Esfahan and Kerman and was taken prisoner by the English in 1916 and then repatriated to Russia and finally released in 1918. He collected in Tibet, Ladakh and Baluchistan from 1906 to 1911 sponsored by the Royal Bavarian Academy of Sciences. He was also asked to collect fishes during his Baluchistan survey for the Quetta Museum by Sir Henry McMahon. He collected birds and fishes and his central Asian collections of birds were examined by Karl Parrot in 1906 and his Baluchistan collection was examined by Alfred Laubmann in 1914. Corvus splendens zugmayeri was named after him by Laubmann. Many of his collections deposited in Munich were lost during World War II.

Laubman was a member of the Österreichische Geographische Gesellschaft and for his war services he received an Iron Cross. He did not marry and died at his home in Bösendorferstraße, Vienna and is buried in the Waldegg Cemetery.

== Taxon named in his honor ==
Species named after Zugmayer includes:

- Batytroctes zugmayeri Fowler, 1934
- Corvus splendens zugmayeri Laubmann, 1913
- Melanonus zugmayeri Norman, 1930
- Pseudepidalea zugmayeri (Eiselt and Schmidtler, 1973)
- Rhagodes zugmayeri (Roewer, 1933)
- Ochthebius zugmayeri Kniz, 1909
- Cyprinotus zugmayeri Brehm, 1914

== Species described by Zugmayer ==
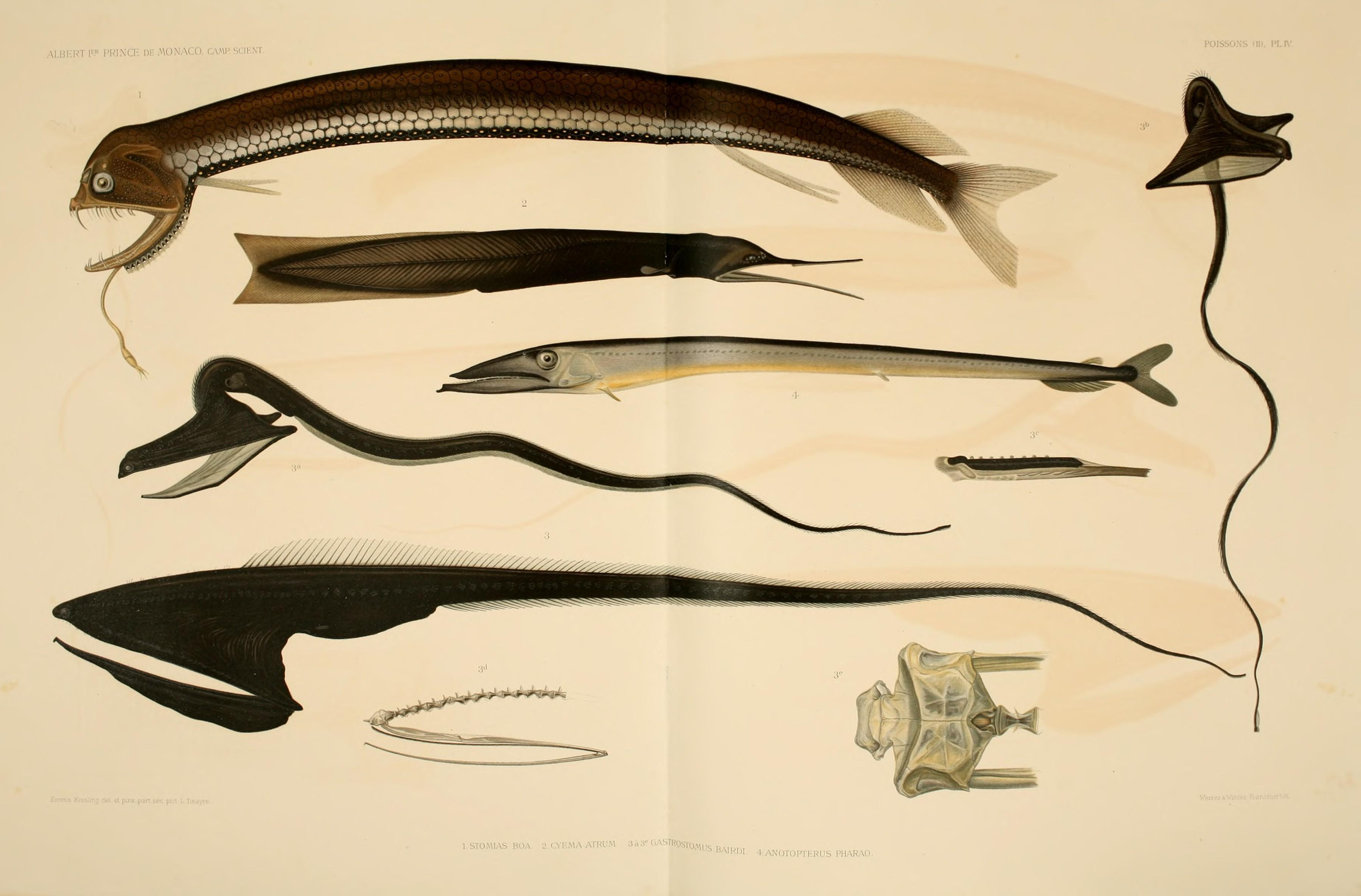
Zugmayer Plate of 1912

- Benthalbella infans Zugmayer, 1911
- Cetostoma regani Zugmayer, 1914
- Lobianchia dofleini (Zugmayer, 1911)
- The Daggerfish, Anotopterus pharao Zugmayer, 1911
- Labeo gedrosicus Zugmayer, 1912
- Flagellostomias boureei (Zugmayer, 1913)
- Aristostomias grimaldii Zugmayer, 1913
- Schistura baluchiorum (Zugmayer, 1912)
- Parabrotula plagiophthalma Zugmayer, 1911
- Photonectes braueri (Zugmayer, 1913)
- Asquamiceps velaris Zugmayer, 1911
- Myctophum rissoi Zugmayer, 1911
- Rhadinesthes decimus (Zugmayer, 1911)
- Sciadonus cryptophthalmus (Zugmayer, 1911)
- Opisthoproctus grimaldii Zugmayer, 1911
- Pachycara obesa Zugmayer, 1911
- Leuciscus merzbacheri (Zugmayer, 1912)
- Platyberyx opalescens Zugmayer, 1911
- Asquamiceps velaris Zugmayer, 1911.

== Works ==
- Eine Reise durch Island im Jahre 1902. Verlag von Adolph v. A.W. Künast, Wien 1903
- Eine Reise durch Vorderasien im Jahre 1904. Verlag Dietrich Reimer, Wien 1905
- Eine Reise durch Zentralasien im Jahre 1906. Verlag Dietrich Reimer, Berlin 1908
- Bericht über eine Reise in Westtibet. Geographische Mitteilungen (7), s. 145–151, 2 maps. (1909)
- Beiträge zur Ichthyologie von Zentral-Asien. Zoologische Jahrbücher 29(3/4), s. 275–298, Tab. 12, Figs. 1–4. (1910)
- Beiträge zur Herpetologie von Vorder-Asien. Zoologische Jahrbücher 26 (1887)
- On a new genus of cyprinoid fishes from high Asia. Annals and Magazine of Natural History (London) (Ser. 8) 9(54), 682. (1912)
- Eight new fishes from Baluchistan. Annals and Magazine of Natural History (London) (Ser. 8) 10(60), s. 595–599. (1912)
- Poissons de la "Princesse Alice" 1901–1910. Résultats des campagnes scientifiques accomplies sur son yacht par Albert Ier, prince souverain de Monaco. Imprimerie Monaco, 1911
- Diagnoses de poissons nouveaux provenant des campagnes du yacht "Princesse-Alice" (1901 à 1910). Bulletin de l'Institut Oceanographique (Monaco) 193, s. 1–14.
- Die Fische von Balutschistan. Abhandlungen der königlich Bayerischen Akademie der Wissenschaften (mathematisch-physikalische Klasse) 26(6), s. 1–35. Muenchen 1913.

== Bibliography ==
- Bearbeitung der von E. Zugmayer in Tibet gesammelten Phanerogamen. 1930 doi:10.1007/BF01258697
- Wer war Erich Zugmayer? PDF1 PDF2
