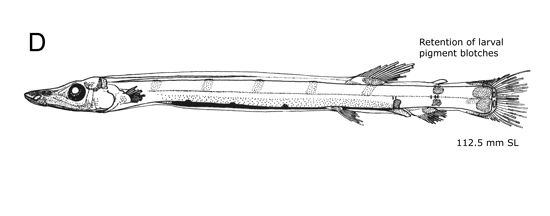
- Javelin spookfish

Scientific classification
- Kingdom: Animalia
- Phylum: Chordata
- Class: Actinopterygii
- Division: Teleostei
- Order: Argentiniformes
- Family: Opisthoproctidae
- Genus: Bathylychnops
- Species: B. exilis

Binomial name
- Bathylychnops exilis Cohen, 1958

= Bathylychnops exilis =

Species of fish

Bathylychnops exilis, commonly known as the Javelin spookfish, is a deep-sea fish that belongs to the family Opisthoproctids (barreleyes). It is typically found at mesopelagic depths in the Atlantic and Northern Pacific oceans. B. exilis has specialized sensory systems, crumenal organs, and a unique eye morphology. These features are adaptations to the animal's food-limited, dark habitat.

The species is notable for the presence of two individual globes per eye socket, each of which has "a well developed lens" and a retina. This has led to the species being called a "four-eyed" fish. They have two primary globes that are dorsally directed and two secondary auxiliary globes that are ventrally directed. Unlike many deep-sea fish that just have a retinal diverticulum (a pocket of retina), B. exilis has a distinct, well-developed scleral lens in its secondary eye. It has been suggested that the purpose of these extra globes is the detection of threats from the periphery, since these eyes point downwards. This feature provides great benefits in their chances for survival.

== Discovery, taxonomy and naming ==
Bathylychnops exilis was first discovered by Daniel M. Cohen. B. exilis is a species of barreleye first collected in the North Pacific and in the eastern Atlantic Ocean near the Azores where it is found at depths of around 640 metres (2,100 ft). The species was initially discovered during a U.S. Fish and Wildlife expedition.

Bathylychnops is considered an early divergent lineage of the long-bodied opisthoproctids. It is possible that Bathylychnops split from the opisthoproctids following the divergence of Ioichthys, though it is also plausible that the two genera are sister taxa. The name Bathylychnops is derived from the Greek bathys ("deep"), lynchos ("lamp"), and ops ("eye") - all referring to the deep sea habitat and luminous eye structure of the fish.

== Anatomy and physiology ==
=== General morphology ===
Though it appears similar to the other long-bodied opisthoproctid genera (Ioichthys, Dolichopteryx, Dolichopteroides, Duolentops) by virtue of its shape, Bathylychnops exilis bears several traits that render it distinct. B. exilis only has one row of vomerine teeth, whereas the other genera either have two rows or none, as in the case of Ioichthys. Additionally, Bathylychnops species have vertebral counts ranging from 67-85, while all other opisthoproctids have less than 60. B. exilis is described with light orange-yellow with a faint band with a dark-brown coloration. The underside is hyaline with a highly reflective peritoneum. Countershading may be seen on the fish following preservation, but is not visible in life. Collagenous tissues associated with bioluminescence have been found near the anus, but bioluminescence has not been definitively proven. The muscle of the fish is entirely white, with no red band present. It is watery, weak, and transparent while the fish is alive. Bathylychnops exilis has lengthened gonads that extend nearly the length of the body. The mouth of the fish in adulthood is terminal and dorsally flattened. The skull and oral teeth of the fish are extremely weak and prone to damage during the capture process. Despite this, the stoutness of the roof of the mouth and tongue suggests that the fish may crush prey before consumption. Bathylychnops exilis typically has 12 dorsal fin rays, 14 anal fin rays, 9-13 pectoral fin rays, and 7 ventral fin rays. This species grows to 580 mm in standard length.

=== Special Senses ===
The olfactory bulb of the fish is enlarged, along with the olfactory rosettes. The optic tectum is also enlarged, as would be expected for a visual predator. The vestibulolateral lobes, associated with pressure and sound information, are enlarged. Naturally, there is also a large lateral line and several cephalic canals. Semicircular canals are present, though they are not particularly enlarged.

=== Crumenal organ ===
As with other argentiniformes, Bathylychnops exilis possesses a crumenal organ deep in the fish's oral cavity. It is hypothesized that food particles too small to be captured by standard gill rakers adhere to mucus on the modified fifth gill rakers, where they are stored until the eventual formation of a bolus that can be consumed.

Organic matter found in the crumenal organs of specimens often includes marine snow or siphonophore tissue, which supports the theory that this organ allows them to utilize food sources other fish might miss.

=== Eye morphology ===
The most striking feature of Bathylychnops exilis is the presence of two distinct globes in each eye socket. The eyes are large and laterally placed and directed forward and upwards. The cornea is protruded but the eye is not tubular or cylindrical which differentiates them from the tubular eyes common in deep sea fishes. The primary globe appears as a pouch-like (vesicular) eye with tubular traits such as a lateral accessory retina and the dorsally directed lens and cornea, while the smaller auxiliary globe is formed from a swelling of the underlying sclera and is directed ventrally. The primary globe are directed dorsally(upward) at an approximately 35° angle to detect silhouettes against downwelling light, while the secondary eyes are directed ventrally(downward) and caudally(backward) to detect bioluminescence from predators or prey below. The two globes are separated by dense aggregations of melanosomes in two underlying layers of epithelium. The retina of the primary globe is composed of two sections. The main retina is ventrally situated, with four layers of rod cells in a condition similar to tube-eyed fishes. Medially, the retina thins to create an accessory retina where the rod cells are spaced further apart and appear in three layers. This accessory retina is continuous with the retina of the auxiliary globe, which is four rod cells thick. The accessory globe appears to use a refraction mechanism, though the actual optical performance has yet to be tested.

In Cohen's initial description of the fish, he interpreted the auxiliary globe as a "black pouch" bearing a pair of photophores. This information should be understood in the context that Cohen did not recognize this structure as an additional globe of the eye, and no later papers recognize the presence of orbital photophores.

Ideas for the evolutionary origin of Bathylychnops' eyes are contested. One viewpoint holds that since the eyes are pouchlike with tubular traits rather than outright tubular, they represent an intermediary position in the evolution of tubular eyes. Other theories rebuke this notion and suggest that the current eyes resulted from a degeneration of previously tubular eyes.

=== Ontogeny ===
Bathylychnops exilis juveniles have a much different appearance than the adults. The head is laterally flattened rather than dorsally. The eyes are directed laterally rather than dorsally, and the characteristic auxiliary globe is not prominent. The mouth is inferior rather than terminal. Juvenile Bathylychnops have been described as being similar to mature Dolichopteryx in several traits: reduced body musculature, vestigial scales, attachment morphology of the fins, a transparent pigmentation with ventral dark blotches, and an eye that is an intermediate state between the tubular eye of Dolichopteryx and the pouchlike eye of Bathylychnops.

== Ecology and behavior ==
Bathylychnops exilis may be found from 200m down to over 640m in the Northeast Atlantic and Northern Pacific. Due to observable aggregations during sampling, adult B. exilis may undergo diel vertical migration, though aggregation due to spawning is also a possibility. Juvenile fish are found at shallower depths. They closely resemble the paralepidid barracudinas, and as such, it is hypothesized that they exhibit a more active hunting style in ontogeny than in maturity.

Bathylychnops exilis' trophic ecology is poorly understood. Stomach contents of Bathylychnops exilis specimens have shown euphausiids, carotenoid pigments, and potentially tissue from a siphonophore. Additional organic matter of unknown origin has been found in the crumenal organ. It is possible that a habit of crushing prey before consumption leads to a lack of identifiable organic matter.
