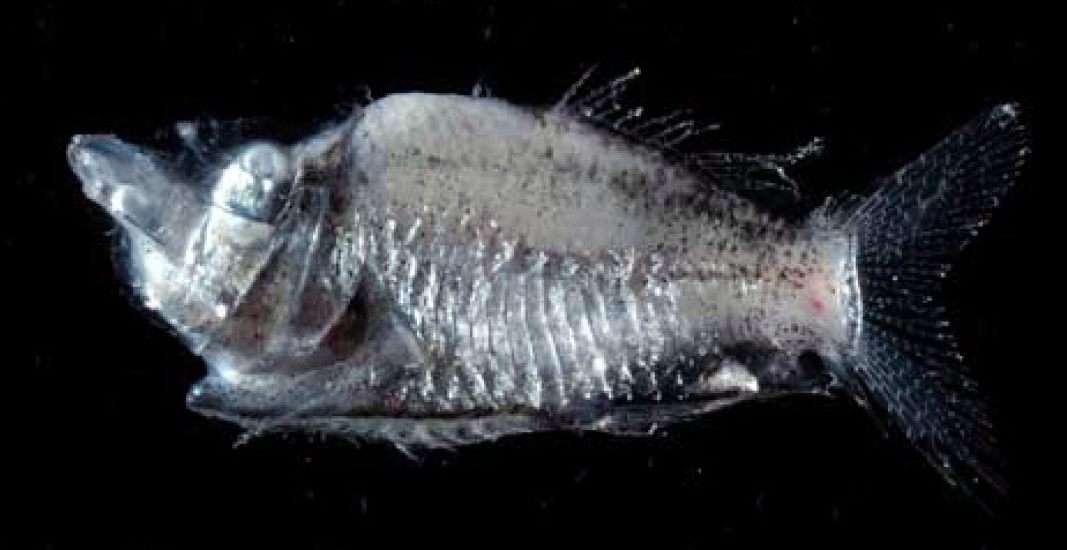
- Fresh specimen
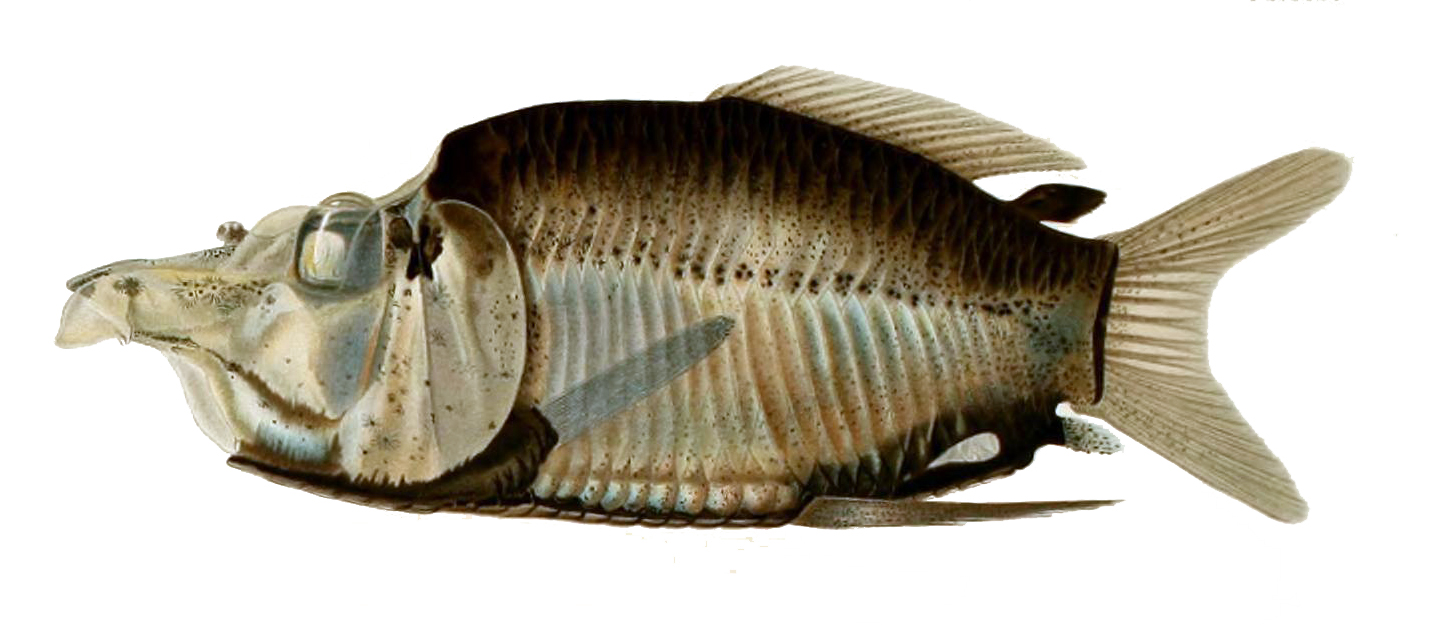

Conservation status
- Least Concern (IUCN 3.1)

Scientific classification
- Kingdom: Animalia
- Phylum: Chordata
- Class: Actinopterygii
- Order: Argentiniformes
- Family: Opisthoproctidae
- Genus: Monacoa
- Species: M. grimaldii

Binomial name
- Monacoa grimaldii (Zugmayer, 1911)

Synonyms
- Opisthoproctus grimaldii Zugmayer, 1911

= Monacoa grimaldii =

Mirrorbelly

Species of fish

Monacoa grimaldii is a species of fish in the family Opisthoproctidae, the barreleyed fish or spookfish. It has a body length of 8 cm (3.1 in) SL.

== Taxonomy ==
The species was included in the genus Opisthoproctus from its description in 1911 until a 2016 review was made using fresh specimens, which found that "O." grimaldii is too distinct to be grouped with O. soleatus (the type species of Opisthoproctus); along with two newly recognized species, this species of barreleye was moved to the resurrected genus Monacoa, coined by Whitley in 1943. However, the genus Monacoa is still the sister genus to Opisthoproctus, sharing the same flat belly covered by enlarged scales (the "sole").

=== Common names ===
Monacoa grimaldii has been referred to as the mirrorbelly spookfish, mirrorbelly, flatiron fish, Grimaldi's barreleye, or simply barreleye.

== Habitat and distribution ==
The species is typically mesopelagic, but it has been recorded from depths of 0 to 4,750 metres (0 to 15,584 ft). Sources disagree on its exact distribution. According to Poulsen and colleagues, M. grimaldii is known with certainty only from the Atlantic Ocean, with records from the Pacific Ocean representing other species of Monacoa. However, FishBase and Catalog of Fishes includes specimens caught in the Pacific, and in CoF's case, the Indian Ocean as well.
