= Winteria =

Winteria may refer to:

- Winteria, a monotypic genus of barreleye fishes in the family Opisthoproctidae with the only species Winteria telescopa
- Winteria, a genus of cactuses in the family Cactaceae; synonym of Cleistocactus
