= Matthiessen's ratio =

Type of optic ratio

In optics, Matthiessen's ratio is the ratio between the distance from the centre of the lens to the retina, versus the lens radius in fish and other aquatic animals. It was found to be constant at 2.55 in most fishes, while the value may decrease from as high as 3.6 to 2.3 in some fishes.

== Background ==
Wilhelm Matthiessen (1840–1890) was a German physiologist and anatomist who made pioneering studies of the eye, particularly fish eye optics. His work in the 1880s laid the foundation for understanding the geometric optics of spherical lenses in aquatic animals. It provides a key metric for estimating focal length and visual capabilities without invasive measurements, widely used in aquatic animal vision research.

== Description ==
It defines that the ratio of the distance from the center of the lens to the retina (posterior nodal distance) to the lens radius in fish and other aquatic animals. It was found to be constant at 2.55 in most fishes, meaning the size of the eye remains constant. However, the value may decrease from as high as 3.6 to 2.3, decreasing the focal ratio of the lens. A higher focal ratio is thought to compensate for the relatively high Matthiessen's ratio brought about by constraints of small eye size during early development. This provides a means for larval fish to focus images from different distances, before the ability to accommodate is gained. Most bony fish adhere to the ratio, with a few exceptions. Larval fish start with a higher ratio (~3.6) that decreases during development to around 2.3–2.6 as the eye matures and gains accommodation ability. The fish lenses have a refractive index gradient that varies from about 1.52 in the centre to 1.33 at its surface.

== See also ==
- Digital Fish Library
- Fish development
- Operculum papillare
- Photophore
- Sensory systems in fish
- Stylophthalmine trait
- Vision in fish
- Visual perception
