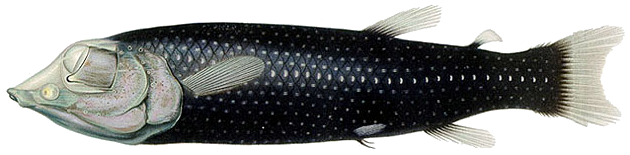
- Binocular fish (Winteria telescopa)

Scientific classification
- Kingdom: Animalia
- Phylum: Chordata
- Class: Actinopterygii
- Order: Argentiniformes
- Family: Opisthoproctidae
- Genus: Winteria; A. B. Brauer, 1901
- Species: W. telescopa

Binomial name
- Winteria telescopa A. B. Brauer, 1901

= Winteria telescopa =

Species of fish

Winteria telescopa, the binocular fish, or jelly-faced spookfish, is a species of barreleye found in oceans around the world at depths from 400 to 2,500 metres (1,300 to 8,200 ft). This species grows to a length of 15 centimetres (5.9 in) SL. Unlike most barreleyes, this fish has more forward-facing eyes, but it still has the dome. Also W. telescopa has been observed being able to rotate its eyes within a trait only shared with Macropinna microstoma.

The fish was featured in the documentary series The Blue Planet.
