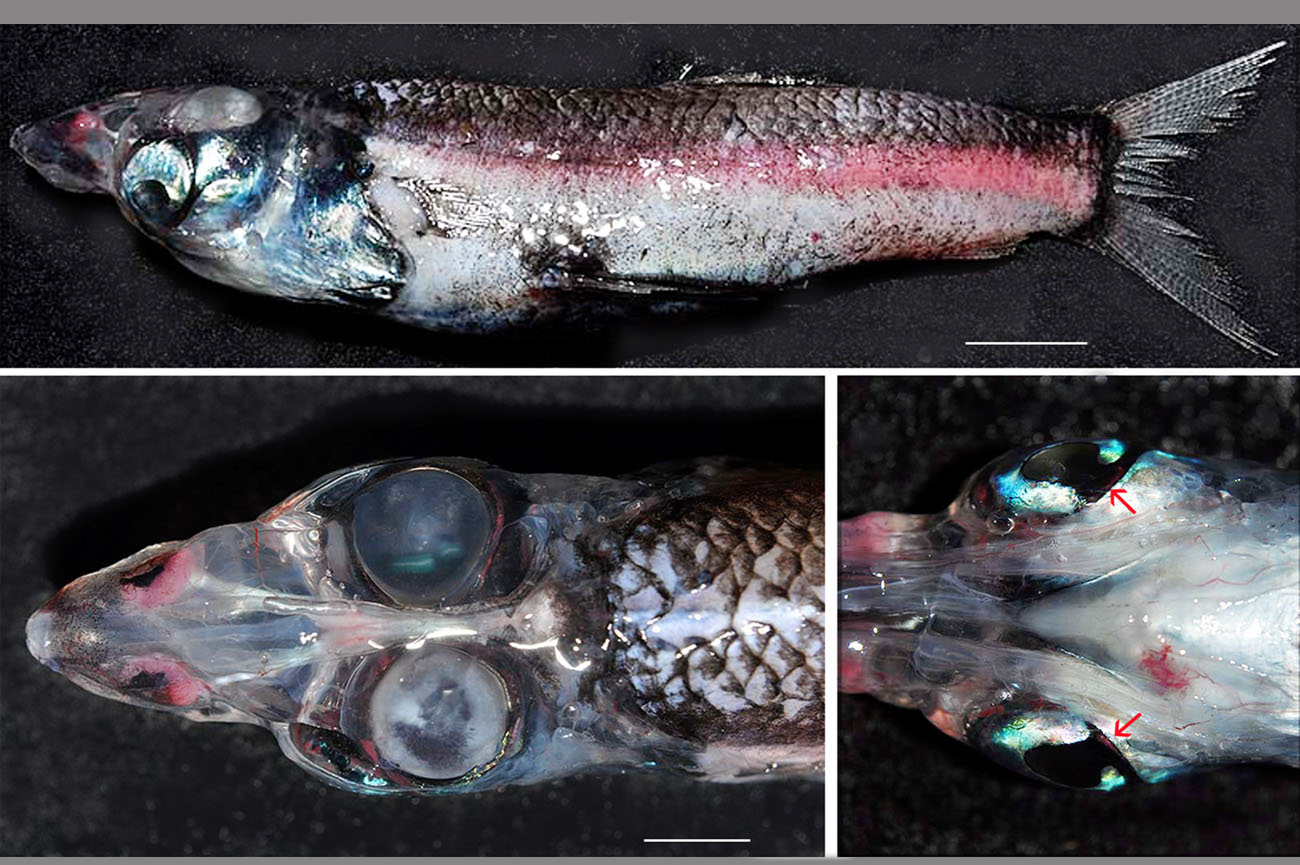

Conservation status
- Least Concern (IUCN 3.1)

Scientific classification
- Kingdom: Animalia
- Phylum: Chordata
- Class: Actinopterygii
- Order: Argentiniformes
- Family: Opisthoproctidae
- Genus: Rhynchohyalus; Barnard, 1925
- Species: R. natalensis

Binomial name
- Rhynchohyalus natalensis (Gilchrist & von Bonde, 1924)

= Rhynchohyalus =

Species of fish

Rhynchohyalus natalensis, the glasshead barreleye, is a species of barreleye found in oceans around the world at depths from 247 to 549 metres (810 to 1,801 ft). This species grows to a length of 16 centimetres (6.3 in) SL. It and the brownsnout spookfish are the only vertebrates known to employ mirrors, in addition to lenses, to focus the images in its eyes. This fish, apart from its fluid filled dome and its mirrors, has four eyes that can see in 360°.
