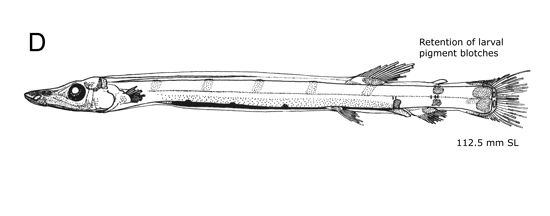
- Javelin spookfish, Bathylychnops exilis

Scientific classification
- Kingdom: Animalia
- Phylum: Chordata
- Class: Actinopterygii
- Order: Argentiniformes
- Family: Opisthoproctidae
- Genus: Bathylychnops; Cohen, 1958

= Bathylychnops =

Genus of fishes

Bathylychnops is a genus of barreleyes.

== Species ==
There are currently three recognized species in this genus:

- Bathylychnops brachyrhynchus (A. E. Parr, 1937)
- Bathylychnops chilensis Parin, Belyanina & Evseenko, 2009
- Bathylychnops exilis Cohen, 1958 (Javelin spookfish)
