= Julian Partridge =

British marine biologist

- Born: February 1959 (age 67)
- Education: University of Bristol
- Known for: Deep sea vision adaptations, visual pigments, deep sea biology, animal sensory systems
- Scientific career
- Fields: Marine biology, zoology, neuroethology

Julian Partridge (born February 1959) is a marine biologist and neuroethologist. His work primarily focuses on animal sensory systems, with a notable focus on deep-sea organisms. He is considered a leading expert in deep-sea adaptations and biology, and his discovery of a fish that utilizes reflective optics to see was groundbreaking in the scientific community.

== Early Life ==
Julian Partridge was born in the United Kingdom in February 1959. After attending several secondary schools across Singapore and the United Kingdom, he attended the University of Bristol in Bristol, England.

== Career ==
After earning his bachelor's degree in zoology from the University of Bristol, he returned to the same institution to obtain his PhD in zoology. His thesis was focused on the light absorption of photoreceptors in vertebrate eyes, laying the groundwork for his future research.

Upon completing his PhD in 1986, Partridge remained at the University, working on medical research. After four years, he became a University Research Fellow, and then eight years later became a reader of zoology. He would then stay at the University Bristol for another seventeen years as a reader and then professor of zoology.

In 2014, he moved to the University of Western Australia (UWA) as a Research Fellow and a Business Director. After three years he transitioned and worked as a professor in the School of Biology and the School of Animal Sciences.

After four years in that position, Partridge progressed within the UWA Oceans Institute, serving as Deputy Director, Principal Research Fellow, Acting Director, and ultimately Director. He remained in that role for nearly two years until his retirement in 2022. Following his retirement, he continues to work with the UWA Oceans Institute as an Adjunct Senior Research Fellow.

== Research ==
Partridge's research has covered multiple topics within marine biology, starting with deep-sea vision adaptations, then transitioning into bioluminescence, sensory biology, and cross-disciplinary research on deep-sea exploration and bio-inspired robotics.

=== Novel Deep Sea Vision Adaptations ===
==== Spookfish Observations ====
Partridge, alongside Professor Hans-Joachim Wagner of Tübingen University and marine biologist Dr. Tamara Frank, was part of the research team that characterized and described the first known vertebrate eye that sees with reflective optics. After capturing a single specimen of the Spookfish (Dolichopteryx longipes) over a trench in the South Pacific, they photographed and studied the eye extensively. The team found that it is separated into two parts: the main eye cylinder and a larger lateral diverticulum. Inside of each diverticulum, they visualized a mirror that appeared to provide a focused image over most of the retina.

The team's investigation into this novel vision system was significant because while some animals have reflective layers behind the photoreceptors, in the Spookfish the reflection happens before the light even reaches the retina. Such an optic framework is highly advantageous for deep-sea fish like D. longipes because of the increased potential to produce a bright, high-contrast image. Additionally, the evolution of such a framework is indicative that image formation in vertebrate eyes is not constrained only to refraction, despite the pathway of evolution taken by most other vertebrates. Since Partridge published this study, numerous teams have performed further investigation into the visual systems of these fish. His work served as a precursor to a new wave of deep-sea biology research.

==== Gaze Stabilization in Stomatopods ====
Partridge conducted several experiments on the visual systems of crustaceans as well. He discovered that stomatopod eyes do not respond to apparent motion artefacts produced by rotation of angled stimuli. This was an important cross-disciplinary discovery, particularly in Partridge's field of bio-inspired robotics. Understanding how the vision system in stomatopods can resist responding to optical illusions could be valuable to a robotic vision system that needs to maintain visual stability or track objects while moving with an unpredictable trajectory or over complex terrain. This experiment was and still is a leading indicator of the possibilities that the field of bio-inspired robotics can offer to automation and technology.

==== Far-Red Vision in Dragonfish ====
Partridge performed extensive investigation into the visual pigments and bioluminescent properties of dragonfish, a deep-sea fish found in tropical North Atlantic waters. Chemical isolation and testing of the fish's visual pigments revealed that it has one highly optimized for far-red light, at about 700 nanometers (nm) on the electromagnetic spectrum. Most marine animals have pigments optimized for blue light, around 480 nm, because that wavelength penetrates the deepest into the ocean. He also found that the dragonfish happens to be bioluminescent, emitting that very same wavelength of light. This gives the fish a significant hunting advantage, since it can light up its prey in the water without the prey seeing that it's being illuminated. Furthermore, until this discovery it was a previously unknown adaptation of deep-sea creatures. Other organisms evolved to detect the bioluminescence of their prey or predators, but this fish has evolved to be its own beacon. This study was the jumping-off point for several subsequent papers investigating vision adaptations in dragonfish, both by Partridge and by other marine biologists.

=== Adaptational Variance ===
Partridge highlighted just how much of an adaptational variance there is in deep-sea vision. His discoveries have been the foundation for many following studies into visual adaptations, particularly in deep-sea animals. In terms of photoreception, he pointed out that many deep-sea organisms have large eyes, and sensitive photoreceptors optimized for detecting the minimal amounts of light present.

Bioluminescence is another adaptation that plays a crucial role in deep-sea environments. It is a primary tool for communication, camouflage, and hunting. Many deep-sea organisms have evolved visual pigments that allow them to detect the bioluminescence of their surroundings and of other organisms that may be nearby. Additionally, the visual pigments of these organisms are finely tuned to pick up the wavelengths of light most common in the deep sea, usually in the blue light spectrum. Depending on the depth at which the organism lives, the pigments may have evolved differently, which is indicative of the true complexity of visual adaptations.

Many organisms in the deep sea have also evolved specialized eyes that allow them to coexist properly with other species within a common ecological niche. Predator species often have forward-facing eyes, while prey species tend to have wider, lateral eyes to provide a broader field of vision. Some species can also rotate their eyes to adjust to their environment, while others have reflective layers that allow for light sensitivity adjustment.
