= Pattersonellidae =

Scientific classification
- Kingdom: Animalia
- Phylum: Chordata
- Class: Actinopterygii
- Order: Argentiniformes
- Suborder: Argentinoidei
- Family: †Pattersonellidae; Taverne 1974 ex Taverne, 1982

Type genus
- Pattersonella (Traquair, 1911)

Synonyms
- Pattersonelloidea Taverne 1982

Extinct family of fishes

Pattersonellidae is an extinct family of primitive ray-finned fish. It is tentatively classified under the suborder Argentinoidei of the order Argentiniformes (marine smelts and allies).

The family was established by Louis Taverne in 1982 when he reclassified Leptolepis formosus (originally described by Ramsay Heatley Traquair) to Pattersonella formosa.

== Taxonomy ==
- Genus Parawenzichthys de Figueiredo, Gallo & Delarmelina 2012
  - Species Parawenzichthys minor de Figueiredo, Gallo & Delarmelina 2012
- Genus Pattersonella Taverne 1982
  - Species Pattersonella formosa (Traquair 1911) Taverne 1982 [Leptolepis formosus Traquair 1911]
- Genus Wenzichthys Taverne 1976 [Wenzia Taverne 1976 non Pfeffer 1929 non Clement 2005]
  - Species Wenzichthys congolensis (Arambourg & Schneegans 1935) Taverne 1976 [Leptolepis congolensis Arambourg & Schneegans 1935; Wenzia congolensis (Arambourg & Schneegans 1935)]
