= Dolichopteroides =

Conservation status
- Least Concern (IUCN 3.1)

Scientific classification
- Kingdom: Animalia
- Phylum: Chordata
- Class: Actinopterygii
- Order: Argentiniformes
- Family: Opisthoproctidae
- Genus: Dolichopteroides; Parin, Belyanina & Evseenko, 2009
- Species: D. binocularis

Binomial name
- Dolichopteroides binocularis (Beebe, 1932)

Synonyms
- Dolichopteryx binocularis Beebe, 1932

Species of fish

Dolichopteroides binocularis is a species of barreleye found in the tropical and warm temperate waters of the Atlantic, Indian, and Pacific Oceans at depths of from 960 to 1,200 metres (3,150 to 3,940 ft). This species grows to a length of 24.2 centimetres (9.5 in) SL. It was placed in its own genus Dolichopteroides in 2009.
