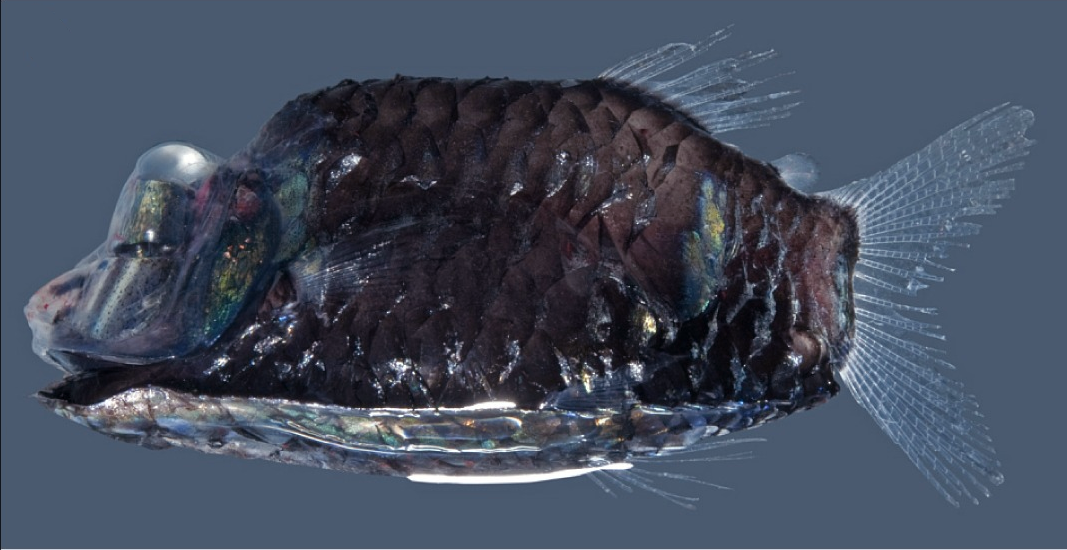
- Fresh specimen
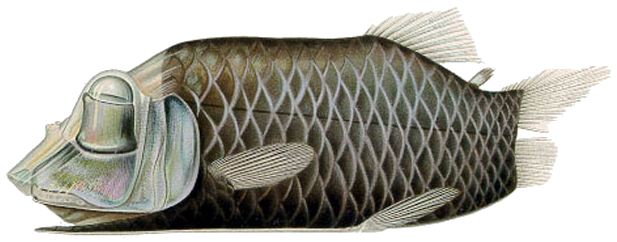
- Illustration

Conservation status
- Least Concern (IUCN 3.1)

Scientific classification
- Kingdom: Animalia
- Phylum: Chordata
- Class: Actinopterygii
- Order: Argentiniformes
- Family: Opisthoproctidae
- Genus: Opisthoproctus; Vaillant, 1888
- Species: O. soleatus

Binomial name
- Opisthoproctus soleatus Vaillant, 1888

= Opisthoproctus =

Species of fish

Opisthoproctus soleatus is an argentiniform species of fish referred to as the barreleye, being the type genus and species of the family Opisthoproctidae. The species lives in most tropical seas, but is more common in the eastern Atlantic, from western Ireland to Mauritania and from Sierra Leone to Angola, and also in the South China Sea. O. soleatus can grow to a standard length of 10.5 centimetres (4.1 in) and usually live from about 500 to 700 metres (1,600 to 2,300 ft) deep.

== Description ==
This species is a small fish, not exceeding 10.5 cm (4.1 in) in length. The body of Opisthoproctus soleatus is deep and laterally compressed. Scales are large, thin, and cycloid. The ventral side of the body was described by Vaillant as a "flattened, oval, elongate sole." The sole extends forwards below the head. It is covered in large thin scales that increase in pigmentation towards the distal parts. The back and sides of this fish are dark and the snout translucent, and there are several large melanophores behind and below the head. The caudal fin is large and forked, with 33 rays total. The dorsal fin is small and begins behind the middle of the body, and has 11 soft rays. The anal fin is inserted on the posterior of the body and has 6 rays. The pectoral fin has 13–15 rays, some of which are elongated and extend beyond the point of origin of the dorsal fin. The pelvic fin has 9–10 rays, and the adipose fin is present.

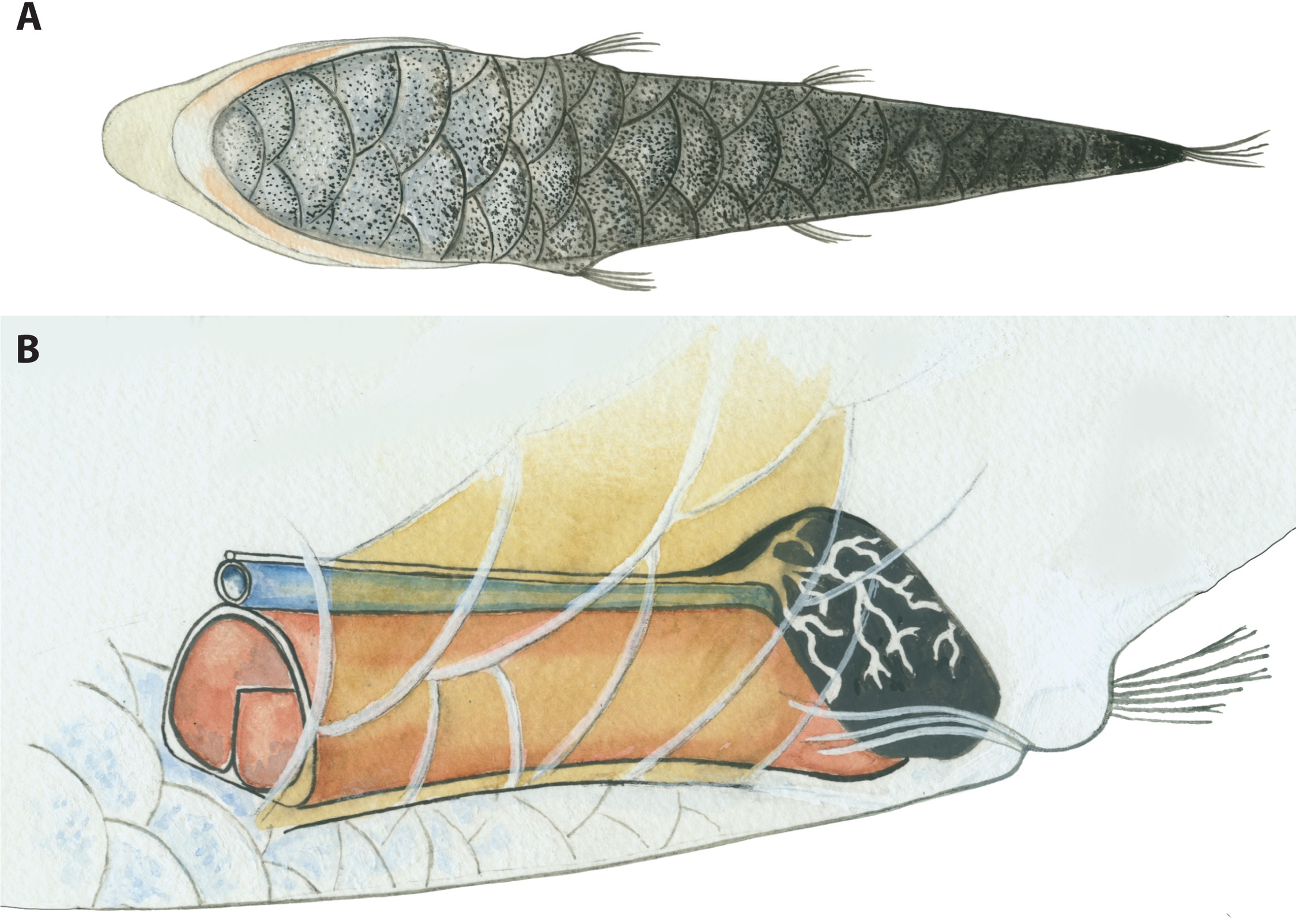
Diagram of the sole and light organ of the sister genus, Monacoa

Opisthoproctus soleatus has a specialized adaptation of the intestine by the anus, termed the rectal bulb, that contains bioluminescent bacteria and produces light. A second specialized organ located in the ventral sole acts as a reflector for the rectal light-organ. Light generated by bioluminescent bacteria in the rectal bulb is projected into the tissue of the reflector organ, which has a reflective ventral wall that reflects the light downward. The reflector can be contracted or expanded, controlling the amount of light allowed to pass through the thin part of the scales and into the environment. Their genus name Opisthoproctus is presumably derived from Ancient Greek ὄπισθεν (ópisthen), meaning "back", and πρωκτός (prōktós), meaning "anus", as a reference to this intestinal light organ.

The head is compressed, with the snout being about 3/8 the length of the head. The mouth is small and extends to half the length of the snout. The upper part of the snout and the area of the head above the brain are semi-transparent. Small teeth are present in the mouth on the lower jaw and the head of the vomer.

The eyes are particularly distinctive, being tubular in shape and directed dorsally (upwards); they have a sideways-oriented diverticulum in the front wall of the eye, though it is unclear what the precise function of this pouch-like pocket is. The eye is large, equal in length to the snout, with the suborbital space covering the entire cheek and an extremely large lens. The suborbital bone is extended and covers the eye laterally.

== Distribution and habitat ==
Opisthoproctus soleatus is found in all the world's tropical and temperate oceans. It has been recorded in the Atlantic, Pacific, and Indian Oceans. In the eastern Atlantic, it is most frequently encountered between western Ireland and Mauritania, and between Sierra Leone and Angola. Its range in the Atlantic Ocean extends from 20° N to 10–12° S,.

Its depth range is 300 to 800 m (1,000 to 2,600 ft) but it commonly frequents the 500 to 700 m (1,600 to 2,300 ft) range, often limited by the 8 °C (46 °F) isotherm which often occurs at about 400 m (1,300 ft). This range falls within the mesopelagic region, which receives dim light from above. This region contains resident fauna, as well as transitional fauna that migrate vertically in response to changes in light.

== Ecology ==
Like other deepwater fish, Opisthoproctus soleatus needs to find its prey in a very dark environment, and avoid being detected itself by larger predators. Fishes with large upward-facing eyes likely hunt by detecting the silhouettes of prey above them which contrast with the low amounts of light coming in. At the depths at which this fish lives, light is still directional, and many species of fish and invertebrates have photophores (light organs) on their underside which camouflage them against the incoming sunlight, which at these depths can still be measured (hence the term "twilight zone"). O. soleatus itself does not have typical photophores, instead having the luminous organ in its intestines. The light produced is shined onto a reflector and projected downward between the ventral scales of the sole, creating a counter-illumination effect similar to that of the ventral photophores of other species. While the exact purpose of this is unknown, it has been proposed that O. soleatus uses this apparatus as a method of camouflage or to communicate with members of their species.

Opisthoproctus soleatus is likely solitary, similar to Macropinna microstoma, another member of Opisthoproctidae.

=== Diet ===
Opisthoproctus soleatus has been found to primarily prey on bioluminescent siphonophores; the bioluminescence of these organisms makes them more difficult to detect against the dim sunlight that filters through to the depths, but the structure of the lens and retina of O. soleatus increases the optics and resolution of the eye, which allows them to detect the counter-illuminated animals.

=== Predation ===
Opisthoproctus soleatus have been recovered from the stomachs of beaked whales (Mesoplodon bidens) which had beached themselves. Other species of Opisthoproctidae have also been found in the stomachs of pygmy sperm whales and some seabirds, such as terns and gulls. It has been proposed that the direction of emitted light from the rectal bulb and reflecting organ in the downwards direction decreases the chances of that light being detected by predators with forward-facing eyes.

=== Life cycle ===
Opisthoproctus soleatus is oviparous, as are all members of Argentinidae. The larvae of Opisthoproctus soleatus appear similar to adults, and have similar body proportions, though unlike the adults the larvae are pigmented, particularly at the base of the caudal fin and in between the pelvic fin and the anus. In larvae, the sole is silver, with two lines of black pigment increasing in size laterally towards anus.

== Conservation status ==
This species lives in the deep ocean and is seldom encountered by man. This makes it difficult to tell whether the population trend is upwards or downwards, or whether the species is facing any particular threats. However, it is regularly encountered over a large part of the ocean system, and in 2012 there were said to be "223 occurrence records and 143 museum records". O. soleatus is not of interest to fisheries and appears rarely in bycatch. For these reasons, the International Union for Conservation of Nature has assessed its conservation status as being of least concern.
