= Ioichthys =

Scientific classification
- Kingdom: Animalia
- Phylum: Chordata
- Class: Actinopterygii
- Order: Argentiniformes
- Family: Opisthoproctidae
- Genus: Ioichthys; Parin, 2004
- Species: I. kashkini

Binomial name
- Ioichthys kashkini Parin, 2004

Genus of fishes

Ioichthys kashkini is a species of barreleye, present in the Arabian Sea. Early records placed it at depths of approximately 700 meters (2,300 ft). Recent data shows a range extending into the bathypelagic zone. A broader distribution across the Indian and Pacific Oceans has been recorded.

== Distribution and Habitat ==
Ioichthys kashkini can be found primarily in a marine environment and in a tropical climate. Usually around 700 meters, this deep sea environment is characterized by very low levels of light, high pressure, and low temperatures.

They are distributed in Western Indian Ocean and in the Arabian Sea. Juvenile specimen have been recorded in Californian waters, and two adult specimens were caught in Peruvian waters.

== Description ==
Ioichthys kashkini is a deep-sea fish with a moderately elongated body, reaching a maximum known standard length of 253 mm (25.3 cm). The species is characterized by its moderately elongated body and dark pigmentation, primarily along the ventral surface and the snout. I. kashkini's physical appearance is adapted for the mesopelagic zone. For example, the epidermis beneath the eyes has a pronounced silvery tint, and the skin and peritoneum in adult specimens are black.

Unlike many other barreleyes that have telescopic eyes, Ioichthys kashkini has pouchlike eyes. One of its most recognizable features is its special eye structure, which is adapted to detect the low levels of light in the mesopelagic. These visual adaptations are important for Ioichthys kashkini, as it helps in their light limited environment.

== Anatomy ==
Ioichthys kashkini possesses a moderately elongated body, with between 53-55 vertebrae. Specimens found in the Eastern Pacific ocean have been recorded with a higher count of 56-58 vertebrae. This species can be distinguished from related taxa by a vomer that lacks teeth.

The eyes of Ioichthys kashkini are "pouch-like"and lack areas of sclerotization. More notably they are characterized by a notable aphakic space in front of the lens and a cornea with two bean-shaped evaginations. Unlike some other barreleyes, such as Bathylychnops, this species does not have thickened subscleral layer beneath the lens of the eye.

== Ontogeny ==
Ioichthys kashkini juveniles exhibit different pigmentation patterns compared to the adults. Juveniles display diffuse melanophore pigmentation, with distinct peritoneal markings along the borders of the myomeres. In contrast, fully mature adults exhibit a uniform solid black coloration across the skin and peritoneum. Specific features of the juveniles ocular development, such as the visibility of the posterior bean-shaped evaginations of the cornea will become more pronounced when the fish reaches adulthood.

== Feeding ==
The feeding habits and biological structures of the I. kashkini are highly specialized for the resource-deficient bathypelagic environment. Due to the fragile body composition and reduced musculature, these fish utilize a combination of unique anatomical filters and mucus-secreting organs within the branchial region. These organs produce sticky film that trap plankton and marine snow, which gill rakers then assist in moving this trapped material toward the digestive tract.

== Taxonomy ==
The genus Ioichthys belongs to the Opisthoproctidae family, which are more commonly known as barreleye or spookfishes. They are a part of a unique group of deep-sea species that have special sensory adaptations and lifestyles. Some taxonomic research has compared Ioichthys to other closely related species including Dolichopteryx, Dolichopteroides, and Bathylychnops, in order to better understand some of their evolutionary adaptations.
