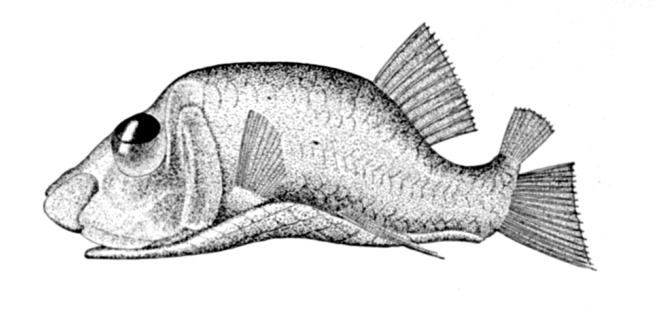
- Opisthoproctus soleatus

Scientific classification
- Kingdom: Animalia
- Phylum: Chordata
- Class: Actinopterygii
- Division: Teleostei
- Order: Argentiniformes
- Family: Opisthoproctidae; Schmidt, 1918

Genera
- Bathylychnops; Dolichopteroides; Dolichopteryx; Ioichthys; Macropinna; Monacoa; Opisthoproctus; Rhynchohyalus; Winteria

= Barreleye =

Barreleyes

Family of fishes

Barreleyes, also known as spookfish (a name also applied to several species of chimaera), are small deep-sea argentiniform fish comprising the family Opisthoproctidae found in tropical-to-temperate waters of the Atlantic, Pacific, and Indian Oceans.

These fish are named because of their barrel-shaped, tubular eyes, which are generally directed upwards to detect the silhouettes of available prey; however, the fish are capable of directing their eyes forward, as well.

== Description ==
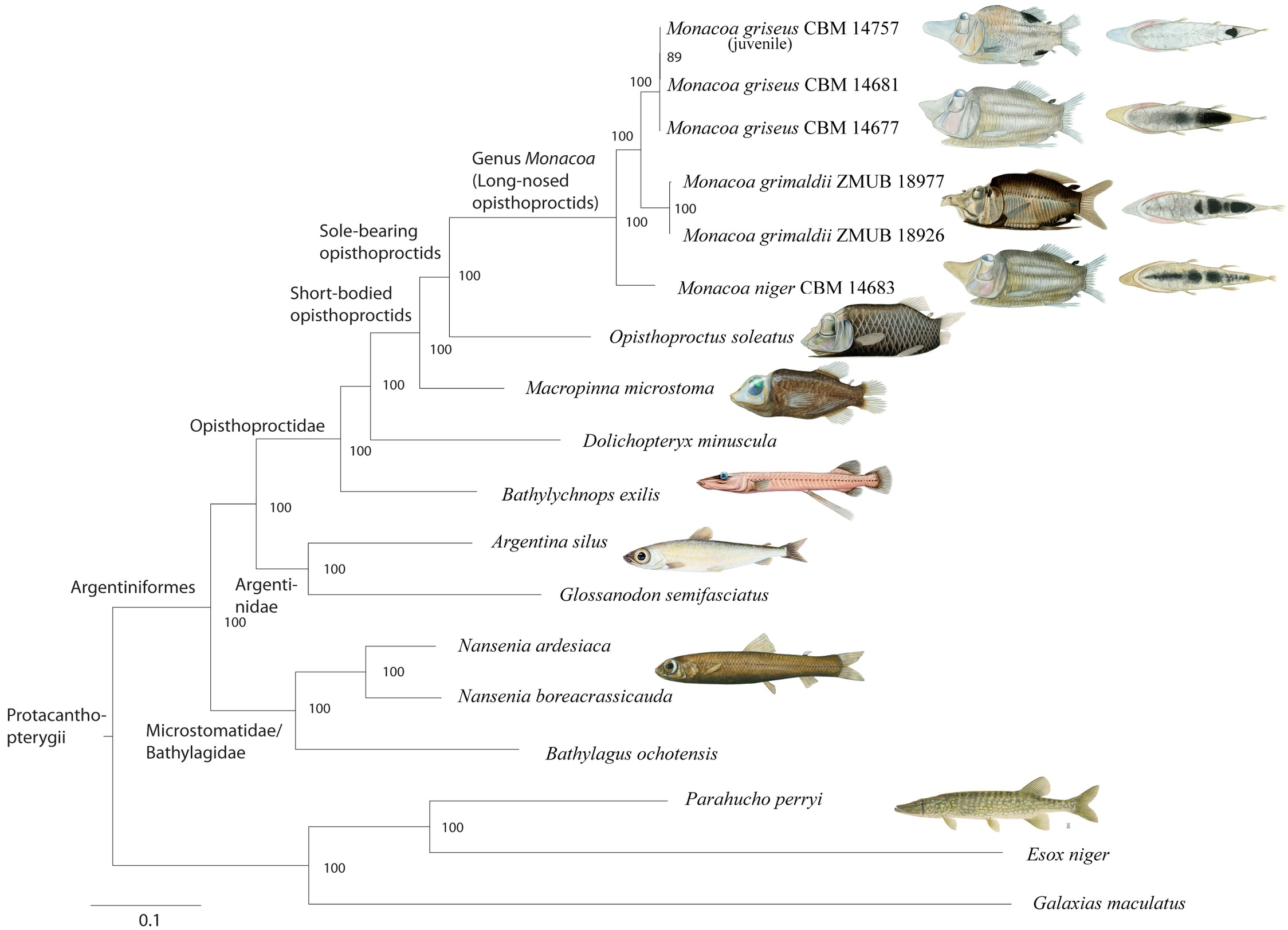
Phylogeny of some Opisthoproctid genera within Argentiniformes and Protacanthopterygii

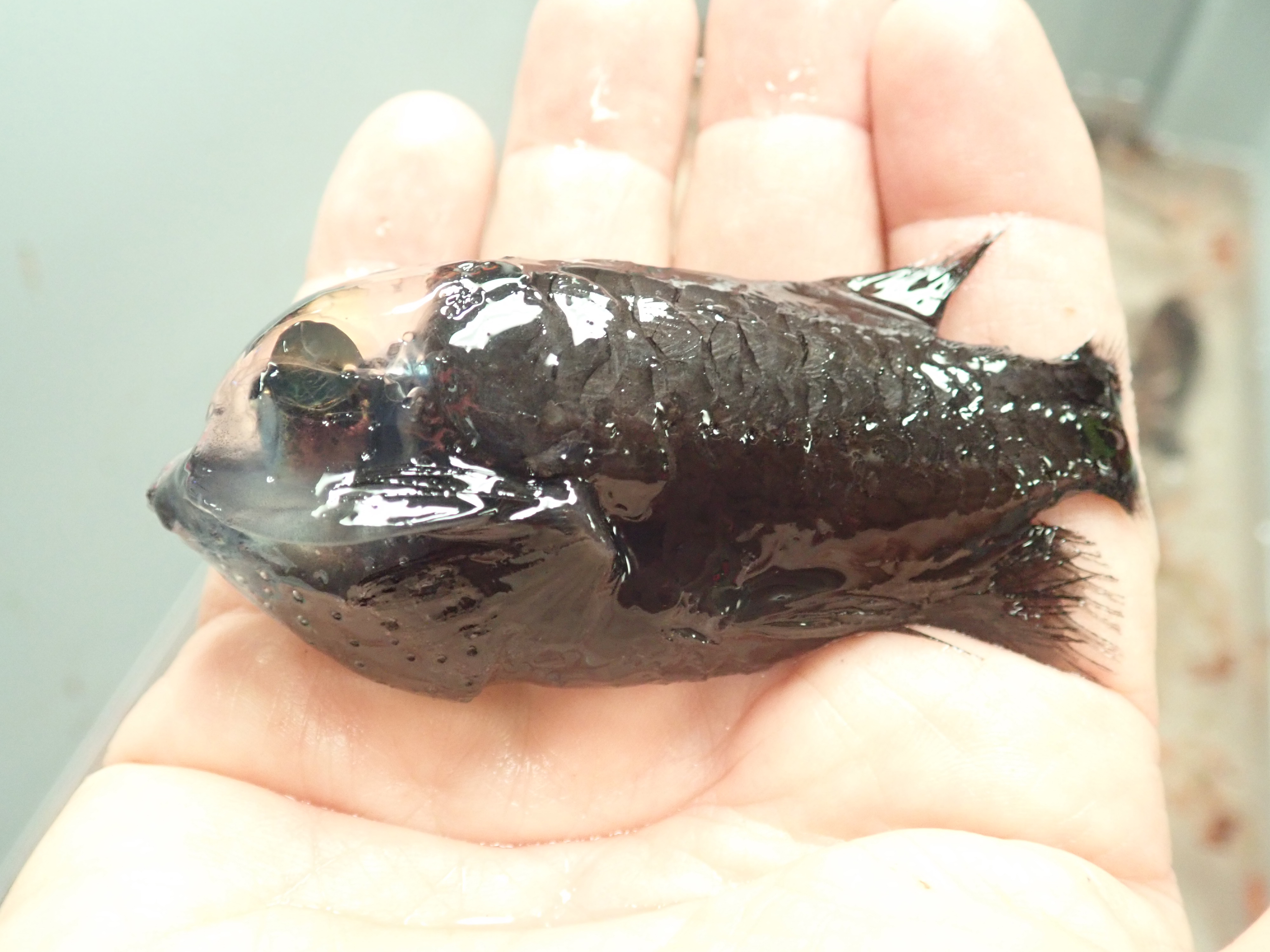
A barreleye fish (in the family Opisthoproctidae) collected with the Methot trawl during the Exploring Pelagic Biodiversity of the Gulf of Alaska and the Impact of Its Seamounts expedition

The morphology of the Opisthoproctidae varies between three main forms: the stout, deep-bodied barreleyes of the genera Opisthoproctus and Macropinna, the extremely slender and elongated spookfishes of the genera Dolichopteryx and Bathylychnops, and the intermediate fusiform spookfishes of the genera Rhynchohyalus and Winteria.

All species have large, telescoping eyes, which dominate and protrude from the head, but are enclosed within a large transparent dome of soft tissue. These eyes generally gaze upwards, but can also be directed forwards. The opisthoproctid eye has a large lens and a retina with an exceptionally high complement of rod cells and a high density of rhodopsin (the "visual purple" pigment); no cone cells are present. To better serve their vision, barreleyes have large, dome-shaped, transparent heads; this presumably allows the eyes to collect even more incident light and likely protects the sensitive eyes from the nematocysts (stinging cells) of the siphonophores, from which the barreleye is believed to steal food. It may also serve as an accessory lens (modulated by intrinsic or peripheral muscles), or refract light with an index very close to seawater. Dolichopteryx longipes is the only vertebrate known to use a mirror (as well as a lens) in its eyes for focusing images.

The toothless mouth is small and terminal, ending in a pointed snout. As in related families (e.g. Argentinidae), an epibranchial or crumenal organ is present behind the fourth gill arch. This organ—analogous to the gizzard—consists of a small diverticulum wherein the gill rakers insert and interdigitate for the purpose of grinding up ingested material. The living body of most species is a dark brown, covered in large, silvery imbricate scales, but these are absent in Dolichopteryx, leaving the body itself a transparent white. In all species, a variable number of dark melanophores colour the muzzle, ventral surface, and midline.

Also present in Dolichopteryx, Opisthoproctus, and Winteria species are a number of luminous organs; Dolichopteryx has several along the length of its belly, and Opisthoproctus has a single organ in the form of a rectal pouch. These organs glow with a weak light due to the presence of symbiotic bioluminescent bacteria, specifically, Photobacterium phosphoreum (family Vibrionaceae). The ventral surfaces of Opisthoproctus species are characterised by a flattened and projecting 'sole'; in the mirrorbelly (Monacoa grimaldii) and Opisthoproctus soleatus, this sole may act as a reflector, by directing the emitted light downwards. The strains of P. phosphoreum present in the two Opisthoproctus species have been isolated and cultured in the lab. Through restriction fragment length polymorphism analysis, the two strains have been shown to differ only slightly.

In all species, the fins are spineless and fairly small; in Dolichopteryx however, the pectoral fins are greatly elongated and wing-like, extending about half the body's length, and are apparently used for stationkeeping in the water column. The pectoral fins are inserted low on the body, and in some species, the pelvic fins are inserted ventrolaterally rather than strictly ventrally. Several species also possess either a ventral or dorsal adipose fin, and the caudal fin is forked to emarginated. The anal fin is either present or greatly reduced, and may not be externally visible; it is strongly retrorse in Opisthoproctus. A single dorsal fin originates slightly before or directly over the anal fin. A perceptible hump in the back begins just behind the head. The gas bladder is absent in most species, and the lateral line is uninterrupted. The branchiostegal rays (bony rays supporting the gill membranes behind the lower jaw) number two to four. The javelin spookfish (Bathylychnops exilis) is by far the largest species at 50 centimetres (20 in) standard length; most other species are under 20 centimetres (7.9 in).

Illustrations of spookfish

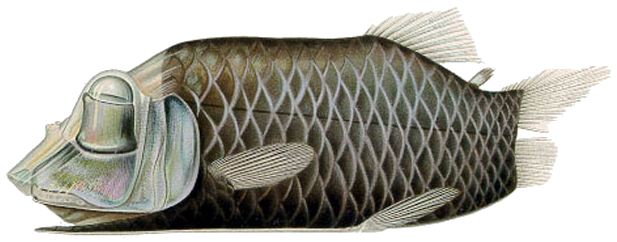
Opisthoproctus soleatus, the sole member of the type genus

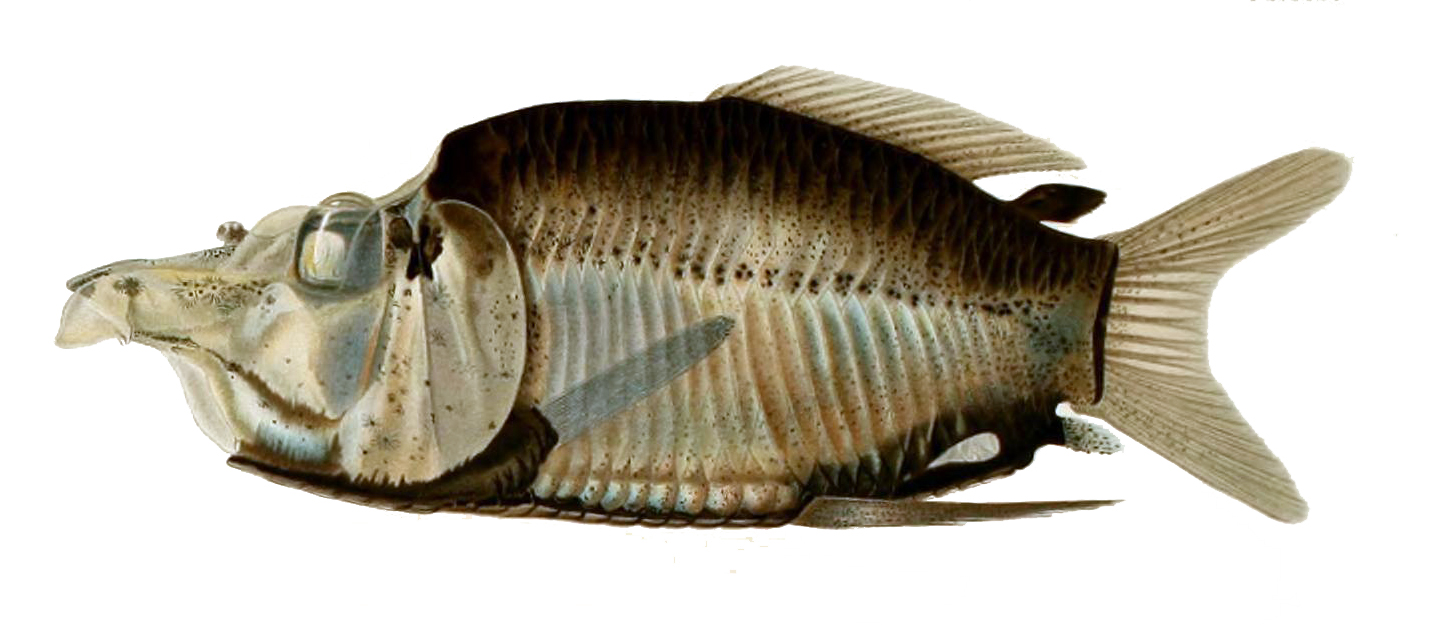
Monacoa grimaldii, split out of Opisthoproctus in 2016

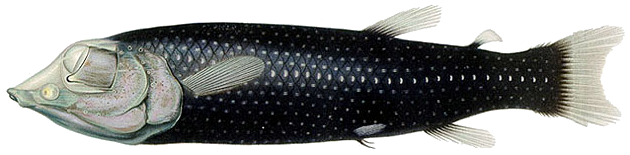
The eyes of Winteria telescopa differ slightly from those of other opisthoproctids by their more forward-pointing gaze.

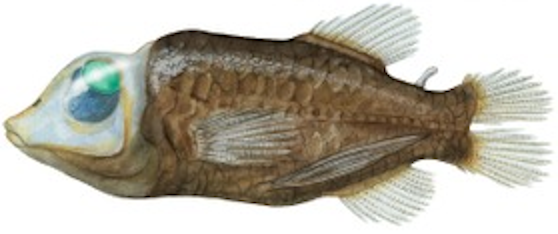
Macropinna microstoma, showing the transparent membrane protecting the eyes

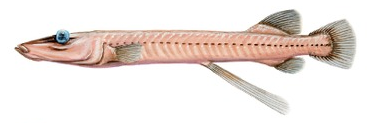
Bathylychnops exilis

== Life cycle ==
Barreleyes inhabit moderate depths, from the mesopelagic to bathypelagic zone, circa 400–2,500 m deep. They are presumably solitary and do not undergo diel vertical migrations; instead, barreleyes remain just below the limit of light penetration and use their sensitive, upward-pointing tubular eyes—adapted for enhanced binocular vision at the expense of lateral vision—to survey the waters above. The high number of rods in their eyes' retinae allows barreleyes to resolve the silhouettes of objects overhead in the faintest of ambient light (and to accurately distinguish bioluminescent light from ambient light), and their binocular vision allows the fish to accurately track and home in on small zooplankton, such as hydroids, copepods, and other pelagic crustaceans. The distribution of some species coincides with the isohaline and isotherm layers of the ocean; for example, in Opisthoproctus soleatus, upper distribution limits coincide with the 400-m isotherm for 8 °C (46 °F).

What little is known of barreleye reproduction indicates they are pelagic spawners; that is, eggs and sperm are released en masse directly into the water. The fertilized eggs are buoyant and planktonic; the larvae and juveniles drift with the currents—likely at much shallower depths than the adults—and upon metamorphosis into adult form, they descend to deeper waters. Dolichopteryx species are noted for their paedomorphic features, the result of neoteny (the retention of larval characteristics).

The bioluminescent organs of Dolichopteryx and Opisthoproctus, together with the reflective soles of the latter, may serve as camouflage in the form of counterillumination. This predator avoidance strategy involves the use of ventral light to break up the fishes' silhouettes so that, when viewed from below, they blend in with the ambient light from above. Counterillumination is also seen in several other unrelated deep-sea families, which include the marine hatchetfish (Sternoptychidae). Also found in marine hatchetfish and other unrelated families are tubular eyes, such as telescopefish and tube-eye.
