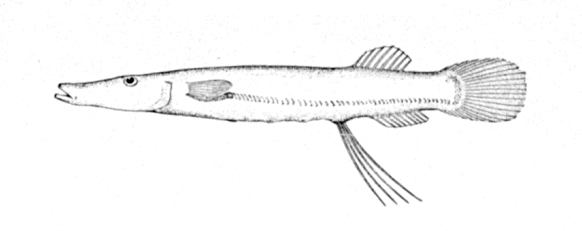

Conservation status
- Least Concern (IUCN 3.1)

Scientific classification
- Kingdom: Animalia
- Phylum: Chordata
- Class: Actinopterygii
- Order: Argentiniformes
- Family: Opisthoproctidae
- Genus: Dolichopteryx
- Species: D. longipes

Binomial name
- Dolichopteryx longipes (Vaillant, 1888)

Synonyms
- Aulostoma longipes Vaillant, 1888

= Brownsnout spookfish =

Species of barreleye in the family Opisthoproctidae

The brownsnout spookfish or brown-snout spookfish (Dolichopteryx longipes) is a species of barreleye in the family Opisthoproctidae. It and the glasshead barreleye fish are the only vertebrates known to employ a mirror, in addition to a lens, to focus an image in its eyes. This species probably has a worldwide tropical and temperate distribution; in the Atlantic Ocean it is known from Bermuda, the Bahamas, the Greater Antilles, and the Gulf of Mexico, and in the Pacific Ocean it is known from the California Current region and the South China Sea. It is found in the mesopelagic and bathypelagic zones at a depth of 500–2,400 meters (1,600–7,900 ft), but usually occurs below 1,000 meters (3,300 feet). In the Gulf of Mexico it is found shallower, at 310–460 meters (1,020–1,510 ft).

== Description ==
The body of D. longipes is slender, the depth 12.6–14.3% of the standard length. The head comprises 29-32.4% of the standard length, with a long, pointed snout. The eyes are cylindrical and face upward, with an accessory outgrowth to the side, and are covered with a silvery layer called the "argentea" for camouflage. The upper jaw is toothless, and there is a single row of small teeth in the lower jaw. There are 13 fin rays in the pectoral fins, 10–11 rays in the dorsal fin, 8–9 rays in the pelvic fins, and 8–9 rays in the anal fin. The pelvic fins are elongated, and there may be an adipose fin. The body is transparent, covered by thin scales. There are four pairs of blotches on the peritoneal cavity beneath the gut, a line of chromatophores below the lateral line to the position of dorsal fin, and two blotches on the base of the tail. The snout is dusky in color. The maximum known length is 18 cm (7.1 in).

== Biology and ecology ==
The diet of D. longipes consists primarily of copepods and other small crustaceans, though as food is scarce in the deep sea it may take anything it can catch. Reproduction is oviparous, with pelagic eggs and larvae. The larvoid juveniles and adults are covered in a gelatinous sheath. Flexion (the curvature of the notochord in the formation of the caudal fin) occurs at around a standard length of 13 mm (0.51 in), and metamorphosis at a standard length of 30 mm (1.2 in). The pectoral and pelvic fins form early, as does the stomach on the left side.

Adult D. longipes exhibit paedomorphic characteristics found in the juveniles of other opisthoproctids, such as poorly developed muscles (for example the lack of ventral muscles, meaning the gut is enclosed only by the peritoneum and the skin), rudimentary scales and coloration, and the placement of the pectoral and pelvic fins on peduncles that are not connected to the body by muscles. Developed gonads have been observed in a 36 mm (1.4 in) male and a 40 mm (1.6 in) female. Their lifespan is 5 years.

=== Eyes ===
The eye of D. longipes. 1: Diverticulum with retina (a) and reflective crystals (b). 2: Main eye with lens (c) and retina (d).

D. longipes is unusual in that it uses both refractive and reflective optics in sight. The main tubular eye contains a lateral ovoid swelling called a "diverticulum", largely separated from the eye by a septum. The retina lines most of the interior of the eye, and there are two corneal openings, one directed up and the other down, that allow light into the main eye and the diverticulum respectively. The main eye employs a lens to focus its image, as in other fishes. However, inside the diverticulum the light is reflected and focused onto the retina by a curved composite mirror derived from the retinal tapetum, composed of many layers of small reflective plates possibly made of guanine crystals, acting as the reflector equivalent of a Fresnel lens. The split structure of the D. longipes eye allows the fish to see both up and down at the same time. In addition, the mirror system is superior to a lens in gathering light. It is likely that the main eye serves to detect objects silhouetted against the sunlight, while the diverticulum serves to detect bioluminescent flashes from the sides and below.
