= Operculum papillare =

Component of the eye in elasmobranchs

The operculum papillare is the iris found in the eyes of elasmobranchs (skates, sharks and rays). It can undergo pupillary light reflex to such an extent that the eye is essentially shut off. It is sometimes called the golden iris because of the shine it sometimes causes.
