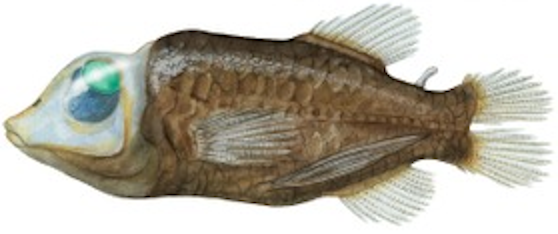
- Illustration
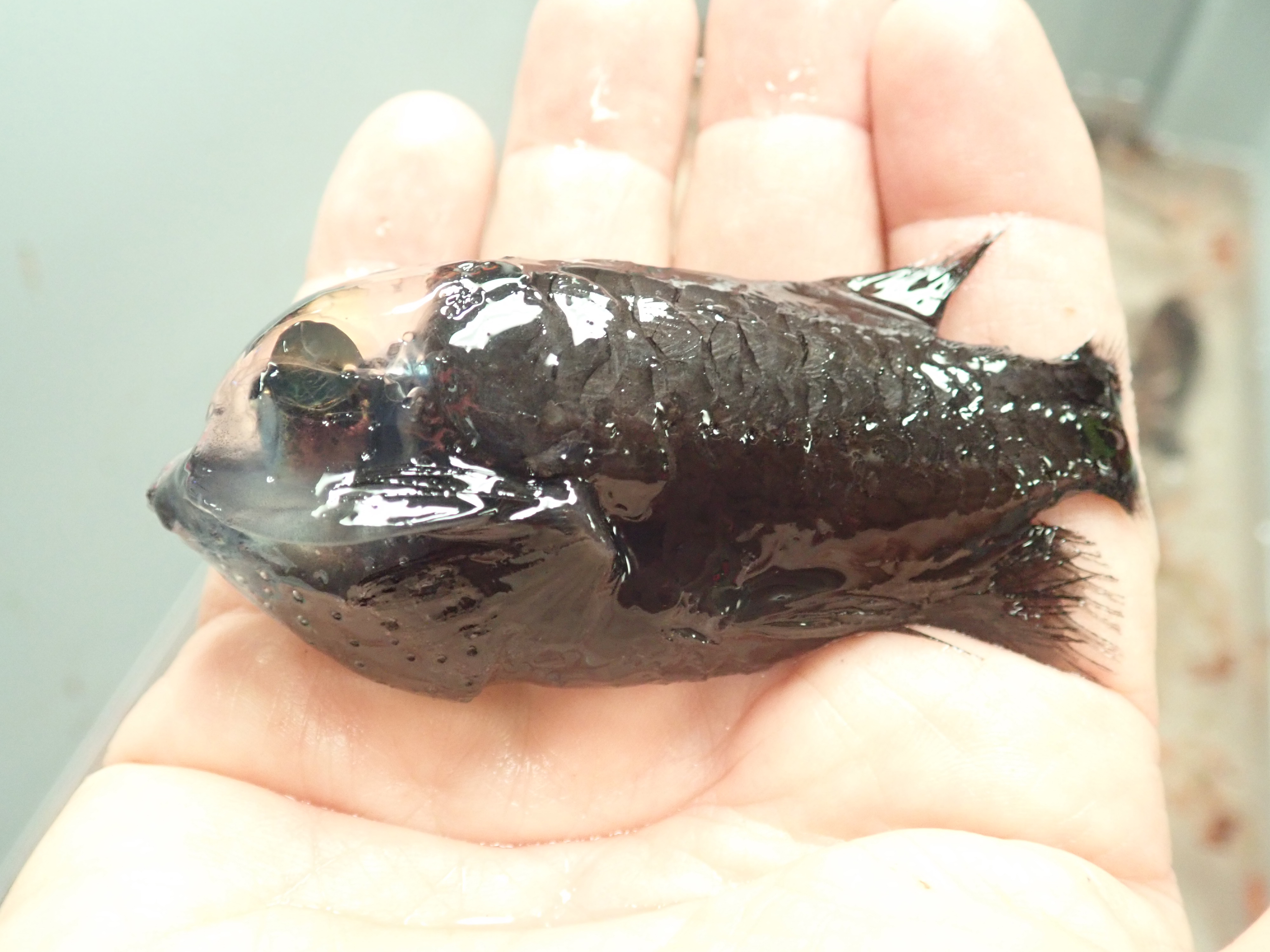

Scientific classification
- Kingdom: Animalia
- Phylum: Chordata
- Class: Actinopterygii
- Division: Teleostei
- Order: Argentiniformes
- Family: Opisthoproctidae
- Genus: Macropinna; W. M. Chapman, 1939
- Species: M. microstoma

Binomial name
- Macropinna microstoma W. M. Chapman, 1939

= Macropinna =

Ray-finned fish

The Pacific barreleye fish (Macropinna microstoma) is ray-finned fish belonging to the Opisthoproctidae, the barreleye family. The only species in the genus, it is recognized for a highly unusual, transparent, fluid-filled shield on its head, through which the vivid green lenses of its eyes can be seen. The tubular eyes of this fish originally were believed to be fixed in place, offering only tunnel vision above its head, but in 2008, scientists discovered that its eyes were able to rotate both up and forward within the transparent dome. This feature allows for M. microstoma to observe prey while keeping its eyes protected from stinging tentacles of jellyfish-like organisms on which it feeds.

M. microstoma, a small fish of about 15 cm, has a tiny mouth, and most of its body is covered in large scales. The fish normally hangs nearly motionless in the water, at a depth around 600 to 800 m (2,000 to 2,600 ft) in the mesopelagic zone, using its large fins for stability and with its eyes directed upward. In the low-light conditions, the fish apparently detects prey by its silhouette; because the eyes have no lens in the diverticulum, images most likely are seen through reflection. Due to the eyes facing upwards, light is able to enter the eyes and through the illumination, silhouettes are formed. MBARI researchers Bruce Robison and Kim Reisenbichler observed that when prey such as small fish and jellyfish are spotted, the eyes rotate like binoculars, facing forward as the fish turns its body from a horizontal to a vertical position to feed. Robison speculates that M. microstoma steals food from siphonophores.

== Discovery and evolutionary history ==
Macropinna microstoma was discovered in 1939 by marine biologist W. M. Chapman, in deep, temperate waters off of the Pacific, Indian, and Atlantic Oceans. It is restricted to deep oceanic water by its light-sensitive, tubular eyes. The eyes are capped with bright green lenses and surrounded by a fluid-filled shield. The presence of this fish was mostly unknown until 2004, when researchers at Monterey Bay Aquarium Research Institute photographed M. microstoma off the coast of the North Pacific. The fragile, transparent dome of its head often collapses or is lost when specimens are captured using nets, but in 2008, scientists were able to picture and describe this dome through video of living specimens captured using remotely operated vehicles (ROVs). Rotation of the eyes from upward-facing to forward-facing was also observed in this study using ROVs and in the laboratory with a live specimen.

Fossil evidence has also shown to be especially important when discovering M. microstoma history. The genus Macropinna has existed for millions of years; it can be traced back to the Miocene epoch, with similar tubular-eye features preserved in a fossil species. Fossil evidence suggests that the barreleye's distinct features are not recent adaptations, but are ancient traits adapted for deep-sea life.

Another important aspect of M. microstoma is that it represents an extreme example of deep-sea fish traits such as the eyes. Over evolutionary time, these traits have allowed M. microstoma to acquire an ecological niche, where the precise vision and protection from stinging prey are essential for survival.

== Environment ==
M. microstoma is a deep-sea fish, living around 1015 m (about 3330 ft) below the water's surface off of California's coast and in the North Pacific Ocean. Because the barreleye's habitat is deep water, the species has enhanced sensitivity to faint light and bioluminescence. The evolution of enhanced light sensitivity is provided through small protrusions in the species' eyes called ocular diverticulum. With these unique eyes and eyesight, the barreleye is able to use upward ocular viewing to detect silhouettes of prey that are above and towards the light.

M. microstoma can grow as long as 6 in (15 cm). It has a large, dome-shaped, transparent head, which protects its sensitive eyes from the nematocysts (stinging cells) of the siphonophores from which it is believed to steal food. Through the dome, the entire inner part of the head can be seen, that is, the eyes, brain, and all the nerve endings that make up its head. At first glance, its eyes seem to be at the front of its head in the form of two black holes; these are its olfactory organs. The barreleye's eyes were thought to be fixed in its head, which would only allow it to look upward.

M. microstoma's large, flat fins allow it to remain nearly motionless in the water, and to maneuver very precisely. Most of the time, the fish hangs in the water, with its body in a horizontal position and its eyes looking upward. The green pigments in its eyes may filter out sunlight coming directly from the sea surface, helping the barreleye spot the bioluminescent glow of jellyfish or other animals directly overhead. The transparent dome of M. microstoma may help reduce light distortion, allowing the fish to better detect prey and bioluminescent signals in the deep sea.

=== Diet ===
M. microstoma shares its deep-sea environment with many different types of cnidarians. Some of the most common are siphonophores (which can reach lengths of 30 ft or 9 m). The barreleye has a strong digestive system and usually feeds on cnidarians and small, drifting animals. The small marine creatures trapped on the tentacles of the cnidarians are also targeted by the barreleye fish.

=== Reproduction ===
M. microstoma is thought to be a pelagic spawner (the eggs are coated with a layer of oil that allows them to float on the closest surface of the sea until they hatch). The female lays eggs in water and male releases sperms in water. After hatching, the larvae begin to descend to the depths as they grow, feeding on zooplankton and other small particles of organic material. No sexual dimorphism or care of the young has been observed.

M. microstoma has been known to science since 1939, but is not known to have been photographed alive until 2004. Old drawings do not show the transparent dome, as it was usually destroyed when brought up from the depths. It is broadly distributed across the northern Pacific Ocean, from the Bering Sea to Japan and Baja California.
