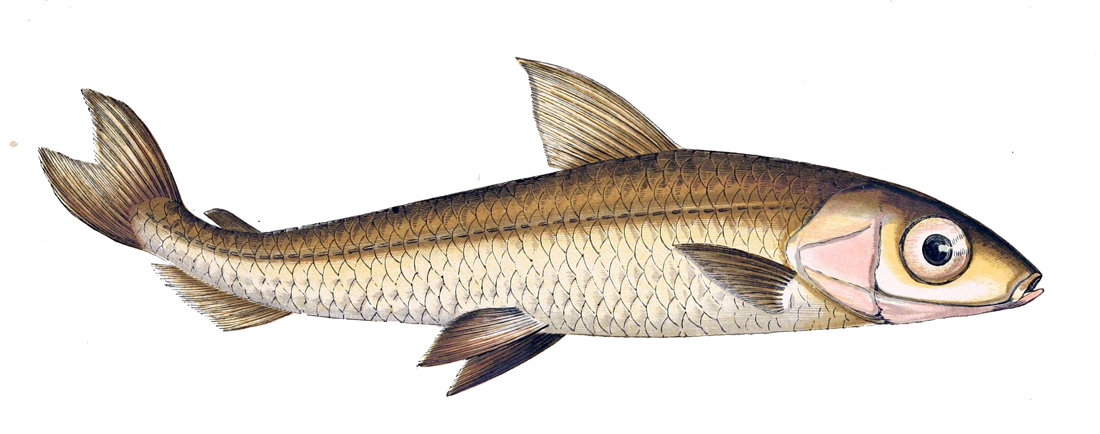
- Argentina sphyraena

Scientific classification
- Kingdom: Animalia
- Phylum: Chordata
- Class: Actinopterygii
- Cohort: Euteleostei
- Superorder: Osmeromorpha
- Order: Argentiniformes

Type species
- Argentina sphyraena Linnaeus, 1758

Families
- †Surlykus; Argentinidae; Bathylagidae; Microstomatidae; Opisthoproctidae

Synonyms
- Argentinoidei; Argentinoidea; Opisthoproctoidea

= Argentiniformes =

Argentiniformes Temporal range: Barremian–present

Order of fishes

The Argentiniformes /ɑːrdʒənˈtɪnɪfɔːrmiːz/ is an order of marine ray-finned fish whose distinctness was recognized only fairly recently. In former times, they were included in the Osmeriformes (typical smelt and allies) as suborder Argentinoidei. That term refers only to the suborder of marine smelts and barreleyes in the classification used here, with the slickheads and allies being the Alepocephaloidei. These suborders were treated as superfamilies Argentinoidea and Alepocephaloidea, respectively, when the present group was still included in the Osmeriformes.

They contain six or seven families with almost 60 genera and at least 228 species. A common name for the group is marine smelts and allies, but this is rather misleading since the "freshwater" smelts of the Osmeridae also live predominantly in the ocean.

The earliest fossil argentiniform remains are otoliths of indeterminate argentinids from the Barremian Kimigahama Formation of Japan. Later otoliths are known of other indeterminate taxa and Argentina itself from the Late Cretaceous (Maastrichtian) of the United States and Germany. A fossil family that might belong in this order are the Pattersonellidae, but more recent studies have found them to be basal euteleosts.

== Description and ecology ==
The Argentiniformes are smallish, silvery or dark and generally bathypelagic ocean fishes. Some Argentinoidei have an adipose fin, which is – unusually for Protacanthopterygii to which they belong – missing in the rest of the order. The dorsal fin is located in the second half of the body. Teeth are absent in almost all. Suborder Argentinoidei have a physoclistous gas bladder when present, or they lack it entirely. In suborder Alepocephaloidei the swim bladder is completely absent.

The hypaxial muscle is unusually extended to forward at its upper end and attaches to the neurocranium below the spine, perhaps to snap the upper part of the skull down when catching prey. The primordial ligament attaches posteriorly on the upper surface of the coronoid process. The autopalatine is peculiarly expanded to above and below at its caudal end, and like in some Otocephala, the caudal part of the mesethmoid appears compressed when seen from above. As in many other teleosts, the autopterotic and dermopterotic bones are not fused together. The most distinctive characteristic, however, is the crumenal organ, also called epibranchial organ. This consists of the additional cartilage and gill rakers on the fifth ceratobranchial, which is found in other teleosts, too, but not as well-developed as in the present order.

== Systematics ==
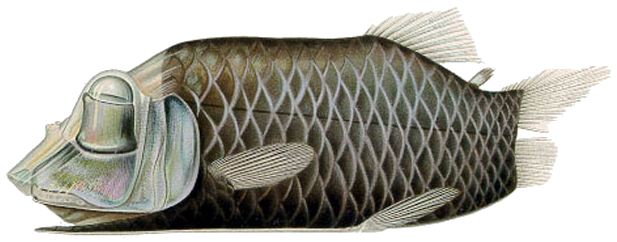
Opisthoproctus soleatus (Argentinoidea: Opisthoproctidae). This image is drawn from a specimen brought to the surface. In a live specimen the membrane over its head would form a transparent dome.

The treatment of the Argentiniformes as distinct order follows the discovery that they are by no means as closely related to the Osmeriformes as was long believed. In fact, they may actually be the sister group to the other living members of the Protacanthopterygii. If this is so, it would probably require either inclusion of the supposed superorders "Cyclosquamata" and "Stenopterygii" in the Protacanthopterygii, or if the unranked clade name Euteleostei is used for this entire group restricting the Protacanthopterygii to the Osmeriformes and either Esociformes or Salmoniformes and establishing a monotypic superorder for the other of the two latter orders. Given the reluctance of modern zoologists to establish monotypic taxa if not absolutely necessary, the former treatment is probably preferable.

The former classification of the Argentiniformes is:

- Suborder Alepocephaloidei (moved to the cohort Otocephala as Alepocephaliformes)
  - Family Alepocephalidae (typical slickheads) (includes Bathylaconidae; Leptochilichthyidae)
  - Family Platytroctidae (including Searsiidae)
- Suborder Argentinoidei
  - Genus †Surlykus (Early Eocene of Denmark)
  - Family Argentinidae (herring smelts)
  - Family Bathylagidae (deep-sea smelts)
  - Family Microstomatidae (pencil smelts)
  - Family Opisthoproctidae (barreleyes)

== See also ==
- Protacanthopterygii
- Otocephala
