= List of fishes known as honeycomb moray =

Honeycomb moray is a common name for some moray eels; it can refer to:

- Gymnothorax favagineus
- Gymnothorax saxicola
- Muraena melanotis
