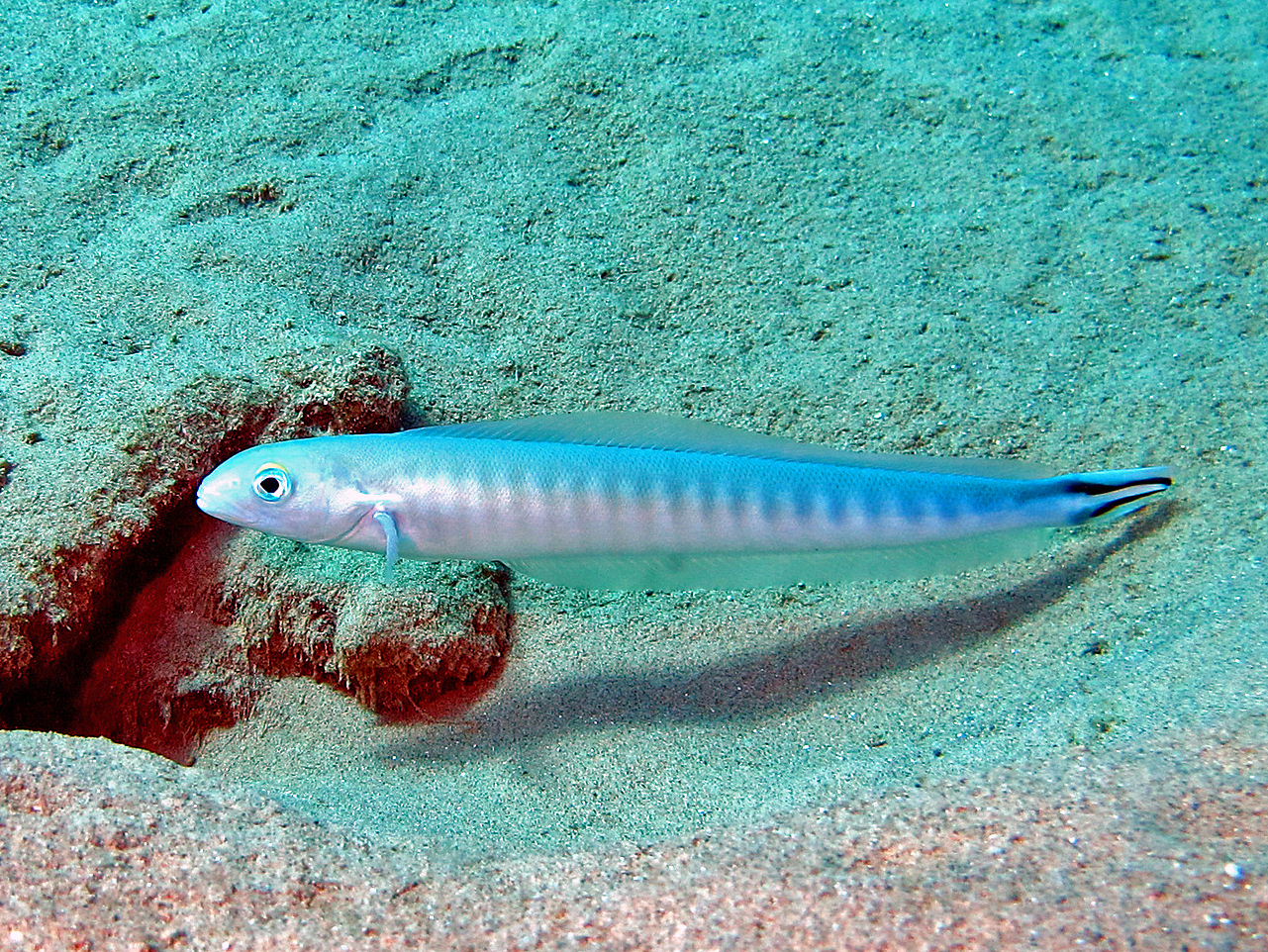

Scientific classification
- Kingdom: Animalia
- Phylum: Chordata
- Class: Actinopterygii
- Division: Teleostei
- Order: Acanthuriformes
- Family: Malacanthidae
- Genus: Malacanthus
- Species: M. brevirostris

Binomial name
- Malacanthus brevirostris Guichenot, 1848

Synonyms
- Malacanthus hoedtii Bleeker, 1859; Malacanthus parvipinnis Vaillant & Sauvage, 1875; Dikellorhynchus incredibilis Smith, 1956

= Malacanthus brevirostris =

Species of fish

Malacanthus brevirostris, the quakerfish, flagtail blanquillo, false whiting or stripetail tilefish, is a species of marine ray-finned fish, a tilefish belonging to the family Malacanthidae. It has a wide Indo-Pacific distribution.

== Description ==
Malacanthus brevirostris has a long and slender body, with a rounded head and a large, sharp spine in the centre of the gill cover. It has an overall colour of greyish with a yellow hue on the head. The back is marked within distinct chevron-shaped bars. There are two convergent black stripes, one each on the upper and lower lobes of the caudal fin. There are 1–4 spines and 52–56 soft rays in the dorsal fin while the anal fin contains a single spine and 46–55 soft rays. This species attains a maximum total length of 32 cm (13 in), although a standard length of 25.6 cm (10.1 in) is more typical.

== Distribution ==
Malacanthus brevirostris has a wide distribution in the Indian and Pacific Oceans. It ranges from the Red Sea and the eastern coast of Africa to Hawaii and on to the western coasts of Panama and Colombia, extending north to Japan and south to the Austral Islands and Lord Howe Island. In the eastern Pacific it is also found at the French territory of Clipperton Island, Malpelo Island in Colombia, the Galápagos Islands of Ecuador and Costa Rica's Cocos Island.

== Habitat and biology ==
Malacanthus brevirostris is associated with reefs at depths between 5 and 50 m (16 and 164 ft). They are largely found in barren and open areas of outer reef slope where they are typically encountered in pairs living on sand in a hole that they have excavated. When threatened, they take refuge into their burrow. They have a pelagic stage to at least 5 cm (2.0 in). They feed on small fishes and invertebrates.

== Systematics ==
Malacanthus brevirostris was first formally described in 1848 by the French zoologist Alphonse Guichenot with the type locality given as Madagascar. The specific name is a compound of brevi meaning "short" and rostris meaning "snout", a reference to this species' relatively short snout compared to its congeners.

== Utilisation ==
Malacanthus brevirostris is taken by spearfishing, hook-and-line, and traps. It is found in markets throughout its range, albeit infrequently, and may be marketed fresh or preserved by salting. It is rare in the aquarium trade.

== Bibliography ==
- Dooley, J.K. (1978) Systematics and biology of the tilefishes (Perciformes: Branchiostegidae and Malacanthidae) with descriptions of two new species., NOAA Tech. Rep. NMFS Circ. No. 411:1-78.
- Fricke, R. (1999) Fishes of the Mascarene Islands (Réunion, Mauritius, Rodriguez): an annotated checklist, with descriptions of new species., Koeltz Scientific Books, Koenigstein, Theses Zoologicae, Vol. 31:759 p.
- The Reef Guide: Fishes, corals, nudibranchs & other invertebrates: East & South Coasts of Southern Africa. Dennis King & Valda Fraser. Struik Nature. 2014 ISBN 978-1-77584-018-3
