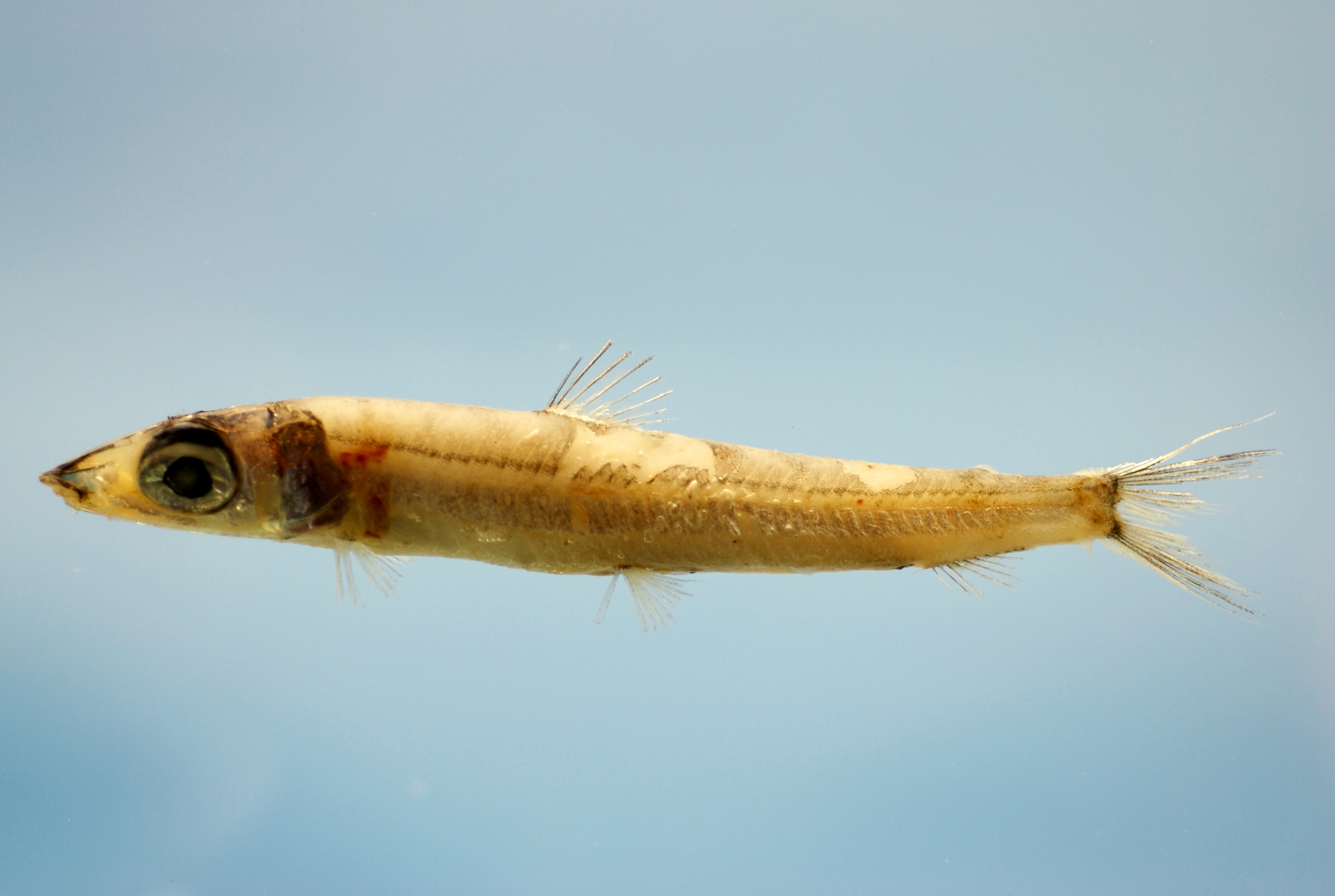

Conservation status
- Least Concern (IUCN 3.1)

Scientific classification
- Domain: Eukaryota
- Kingdom: Animalia
- Phylum: Chordata
- Class: Actinopterygii
- Order: Argentiniformes
- Family: Argentinidae
- Genus: Argentina
- Species: A. georgei

Binomial name
- Argentina georgei Cohen & Atsaides, 1969

= Argentina georgei =

Species of fish

Argentina georgei the Blackbelly Argentine, is a species of fish in the family Argentinidae found in the western Atlantic Ocean along the coasts of Florida, the Caribbean islands and Central America where it occurs at depths of from 220 to 457 metres (722 to 1,499 ft). This species grows to a length of 14.6 centimetres (5.7 in) SL.

== Etymology ==
The fish is named in honor of George Clipper, of the Bureau of Commercial Fisheries Systematics Laboratory, at the U.S. National Museum.
