= Muraena appendiculata =

Scientific classification
- Kingdom: Animalia
- Phylum: Chordata
- Class: Actinopterygii
- Order: Anguilliformes
- Family: Muraenidae
- Genus: Muraena
- Species: M. appendiculata

Binomial name
- Muraena appendiculata (Guichenot, 1848)

Synonyms
- Murenophis appendiculata Guichenot, 1848

Species of fish

Muraena appendiculata is a moray eel found in the southeast Pacific Ocean around Chile. It was described by Alphonse Guichenot in 1848, originally under the genus Murenophis.
