= M. robusta =

M. robusta may refer to:

- Marsdenia robusta, synonym of Stephanotis arabica, a plant species endemic to Socotra and mainland Yemen
- Metrosideros robusta, the Northern rata, a huge forest tree endemic to New Zealand
- Mogera robusta, the large mole, a mammal species found in China, North Korea, South Korea and Russia
- Moroteuthis robusta, the robust clubhook squid, a squid species found primarily in the boreal to temperate North Pacific
- Muraena robusta, the Stout moray, a moray eel species found in the eastern and central Atlantic Ocean
- Myristica robusta, a plant species endemic to Indonesia
- Mystacina robusta, the New Zealand greater short-tailed bat, a bat species unique to New Zealand

== See also ==
- Robusta
