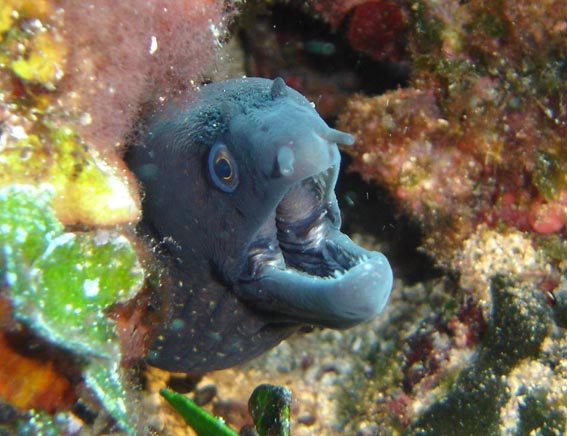
- Muraena helena

Scientific classification
- Kingdom: Animalia
- Phylum: Chordata
- Class: Actinopterygii
- Division: Teleostei
- Order: Anguilliformes
- Family: Muraenidae
- Subfamily: Muraeninae
- Genus: Muraena; Linnaeus, 1758

Type species
- Muraena helena Linnaeus, 1758

Species
- See text.

= Muraena =

Muraena Temporal range: Late Miocene to Present

Genus of fishes

Muraena is a genus of nine valid species of large eels in the family Muraenidae.

This genus is common in the Mediterranean, and is abundantly represented in tropical and subtropical seas, especially in rocky parts or on coral reefs. In the majority, a long fin runs from the head along the back, round the tail to the vent, but all are destitute of pectoral and ventral fins. The skin is scaleless and smooth, in many species ornamented with varied and bright colours.

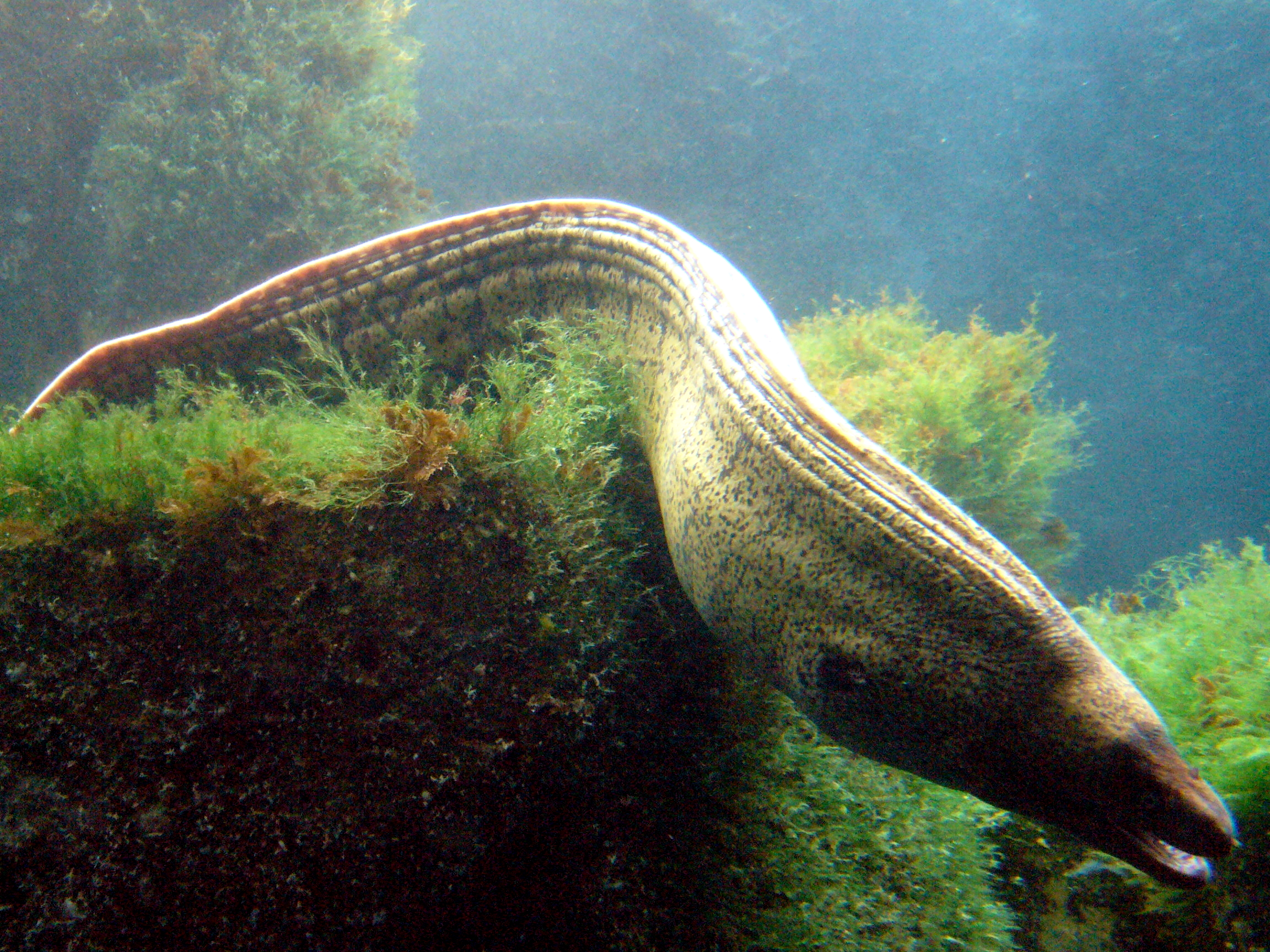
Muraena helena

The mouth is wide, the jaws strong and armed with formidable, generally sharply pointed, teeth, which enable the Muraena not only to seize its prey (which chiefly consists of other fishes) but also to inflict serious, and sometimes dangerous, wounds on its enemies. It attacks persons who approach its places of concealment in shallow water, and is feared by fishermen. At least one species, Muraena retifera, possesses an additional "raptorial pharyngeal jaw" within the pharynx, which is mobile and can be thrust forwards quickly to assist in grasping prey.

Some tropical Muraena species exceed a length of 5 feet (150 cm), but most of the species, among them the Mediterranean moray, are somewhat smaller. The latter, the "murena" of the Italians and the Muraena helena of ichthyologists, was considered by the ancient Romans to be one of the greatest delicacies, and was kept in large ponds and aquaria. It is native to the coasts of southern Europe, North Africa, and Macaronesia, but has also been introduced to the Red Sea. Records of it from Australia are likely erroneous.

== Species ==
- Muraena appendiculata (Guichenot, 1848) incertae sedis
- Muraena argus (Steindachner, 1870) (White-spotted moray)
- Muraena augusti (Kaup, 1856)
- Muraena clepsydra C. H. Gilbert, 1898 (Hourglass moray)
- Muraena helena Linnaeus, 1758 (Mediterranean moray)
- Muraena lentiginosa Jenyns, 1842 (Jewel moray)
- Muraena melanotis (Kaup, 1860) (Honeycomb moray)
- Muraena pavonina J. Richardson, 1845 (Whitespot moray)
- Muraena retifera Goode & T. H. Bean, 1882 (Reticulate moray)
- Muraena robusta Osório, 1911 (Stout moray)

A single fossil species, †Muraena saheliensis Arambourg, 1928 is known from the latest Miocene (Messinian) of Algeria.

== Formerly Included Species ==
- Muraena anguilla Linnaeus, 1758 (European eel) - valid as Anguilla anguilla Linnaeus, 1758
