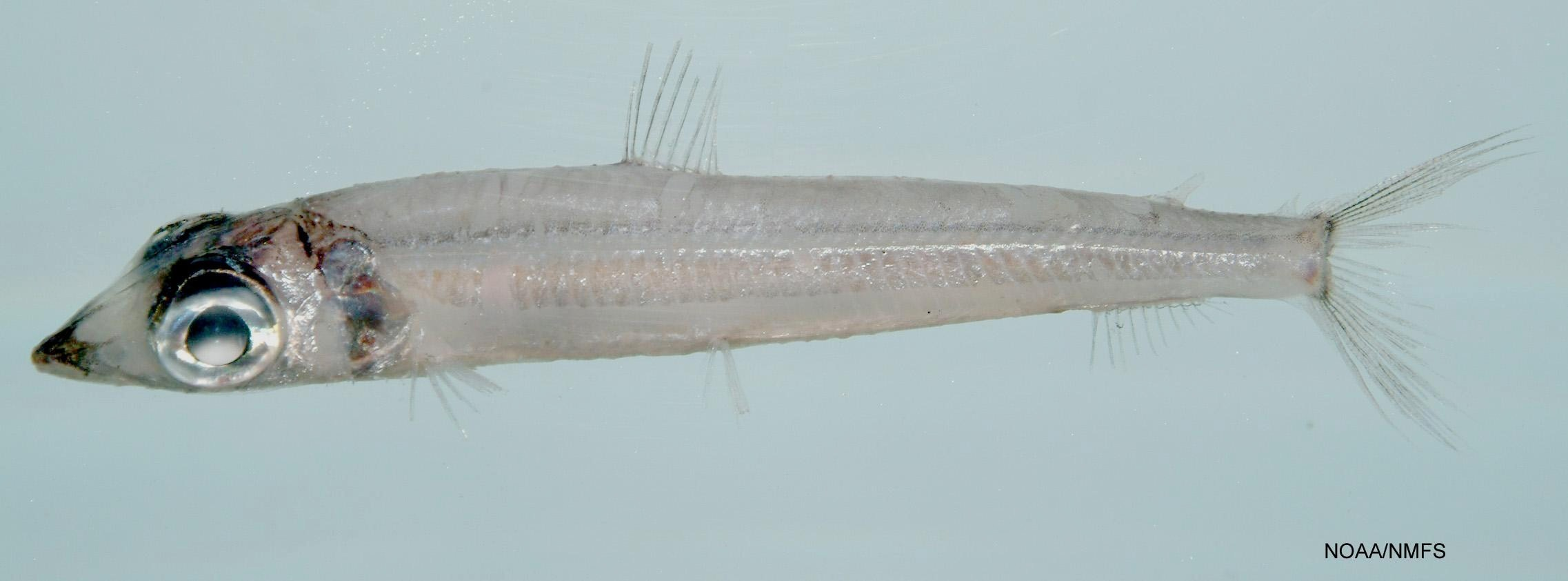

Scientific classification
- Domain: Eukaryota
- Kingdom: Animalia
- Phylum: Chordata
- Class: Actinopterygii
- Order: Argentiniformes
- Family: Argentinidae
- Genus: Argentina
- Species: A. striata

Binomial name
- Argentina striata Goode & Bean, 1896

= Argentina striata =

Species of fish

Argentina striata, the striated argentine, is a species of fish in the family Argentinidae found in the western Atlantic Ocean from Nova Scotia in Canada to Uruguay where it occurs at depths of 100 to 600 metres (330 to 1,970 ft). This species grows to a length of 24 centimetres (9.4 in).
