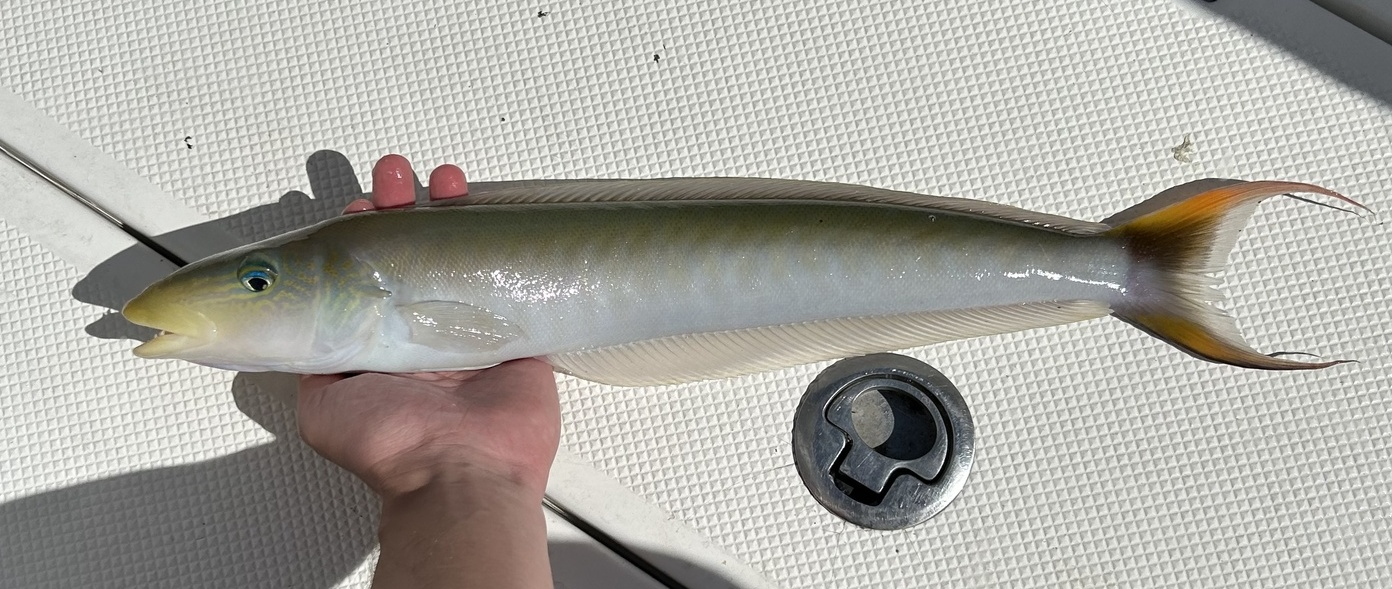
- Malacanthus plumieri
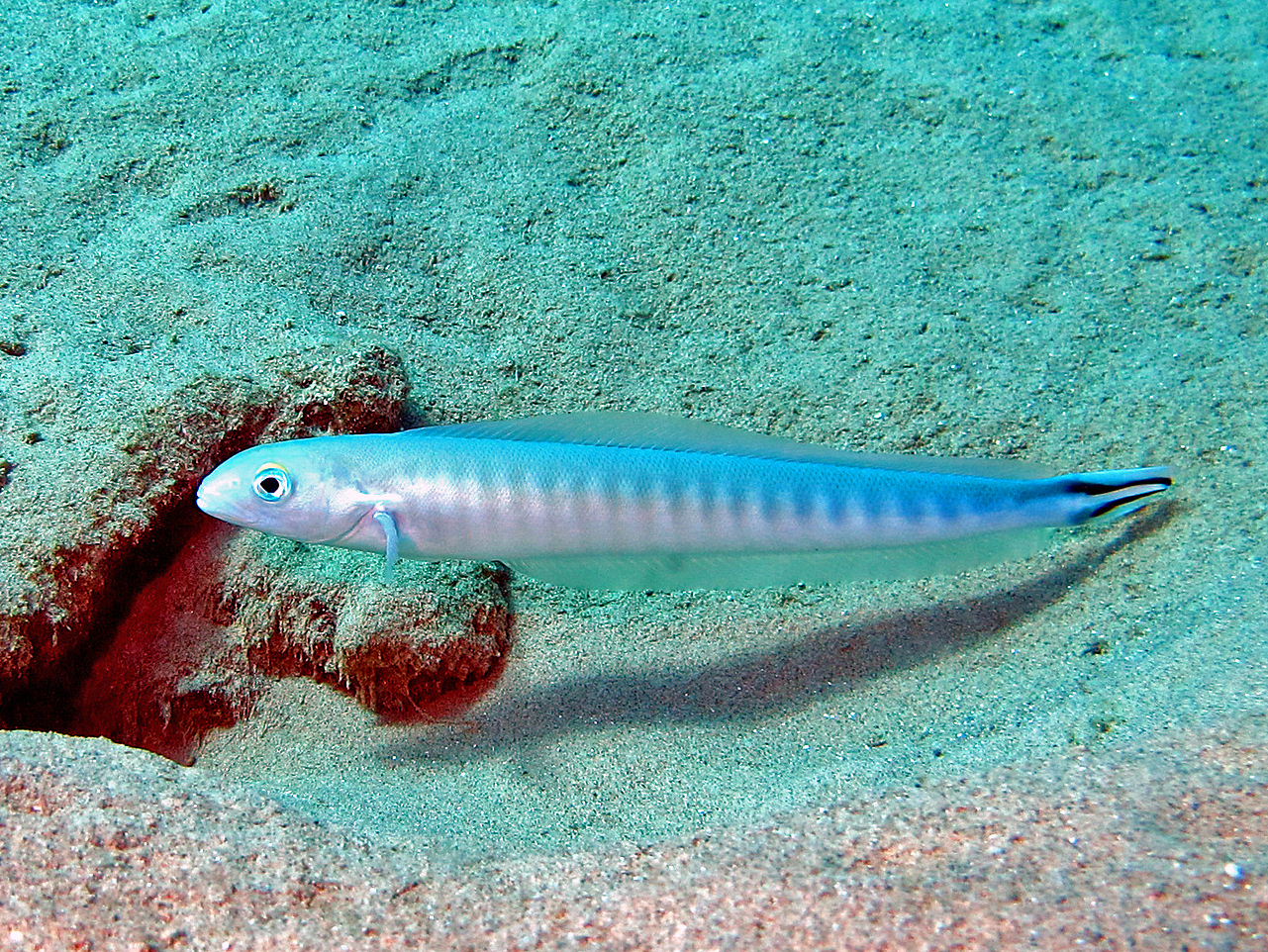
- Malacanthus brevirostris

Scientific classification
- Kingdom: Animalia
- Phylum: Chordata
- Class: Actinopterygii
- Order: Acanthuriformes
- Family: Malacanthidae
- Genus: Malacanthus; G. Cuvier, 1829

Type species
- Coryphaena plumieri Bloch, 1786

Synonyms
- Oceanops D. S. Jordan & Seale, 1906; Dikellorhynchus J. L. B. Smith, 1956

= Malacanthus =

Malacanthus Temporal range: Middle Miocene to present

Genus of ray-finned fishes

Malacanthus is a small genus of tilefishes, family Malacanthidae. They are native to the western Atlantic Ocean and the Indian and Pacific Oceans.

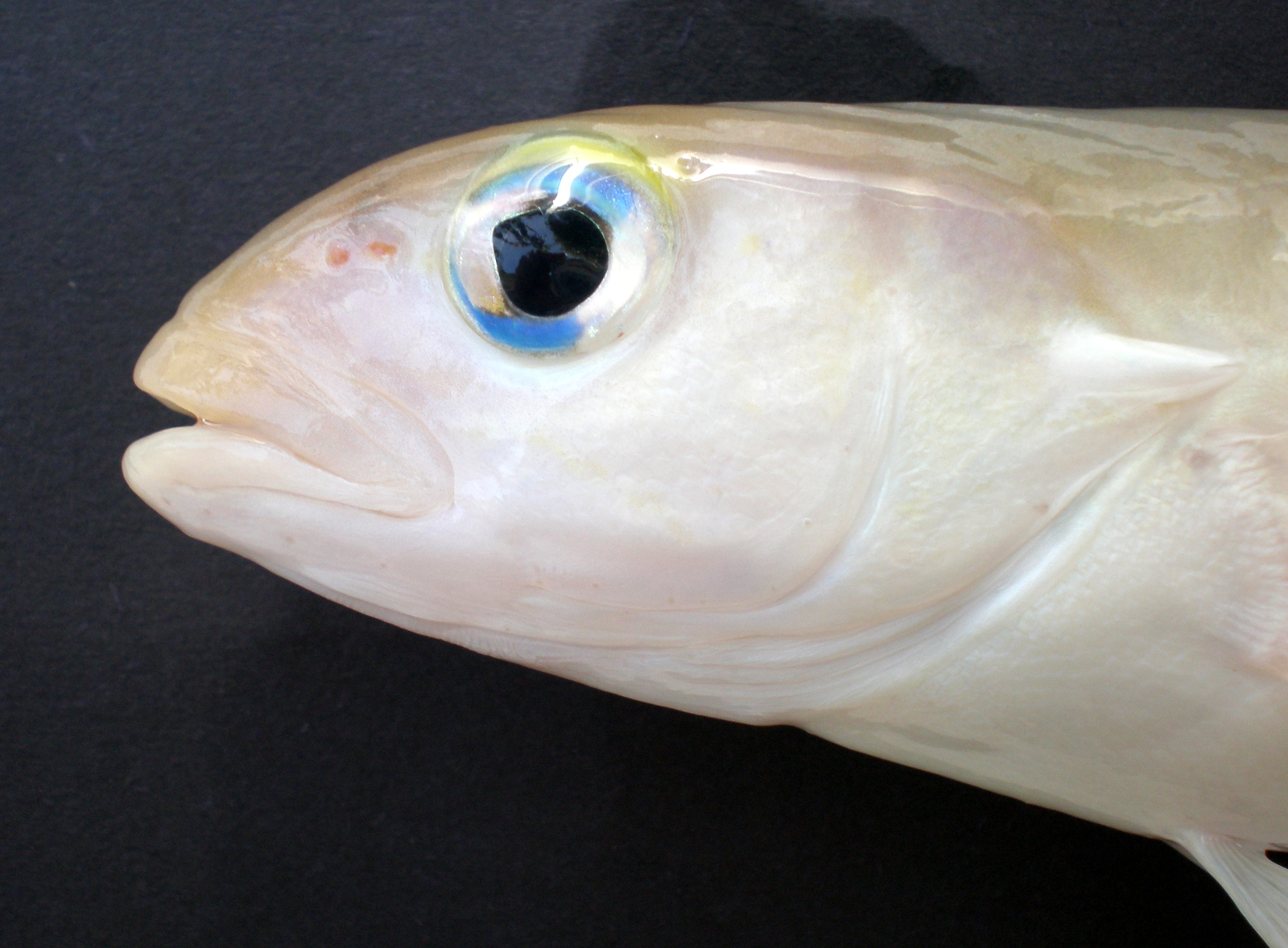
Malacanthus brevirostris, head

== Species ==
There are currently three recognized species in this genus:

- Malacanthus brevirostris Guichenot, 1848 (Quakerfish)
- Malacanthus latovittatus (Lacépède, 1801) (Blue blanquillo)
- Malacanthus plumieri (Bloch, 1786) (Sand tilefish)

A single fossil species is also known:

- †Malacanthus carosii Carnevale, 2016 (Middle Miocene of Austria)
