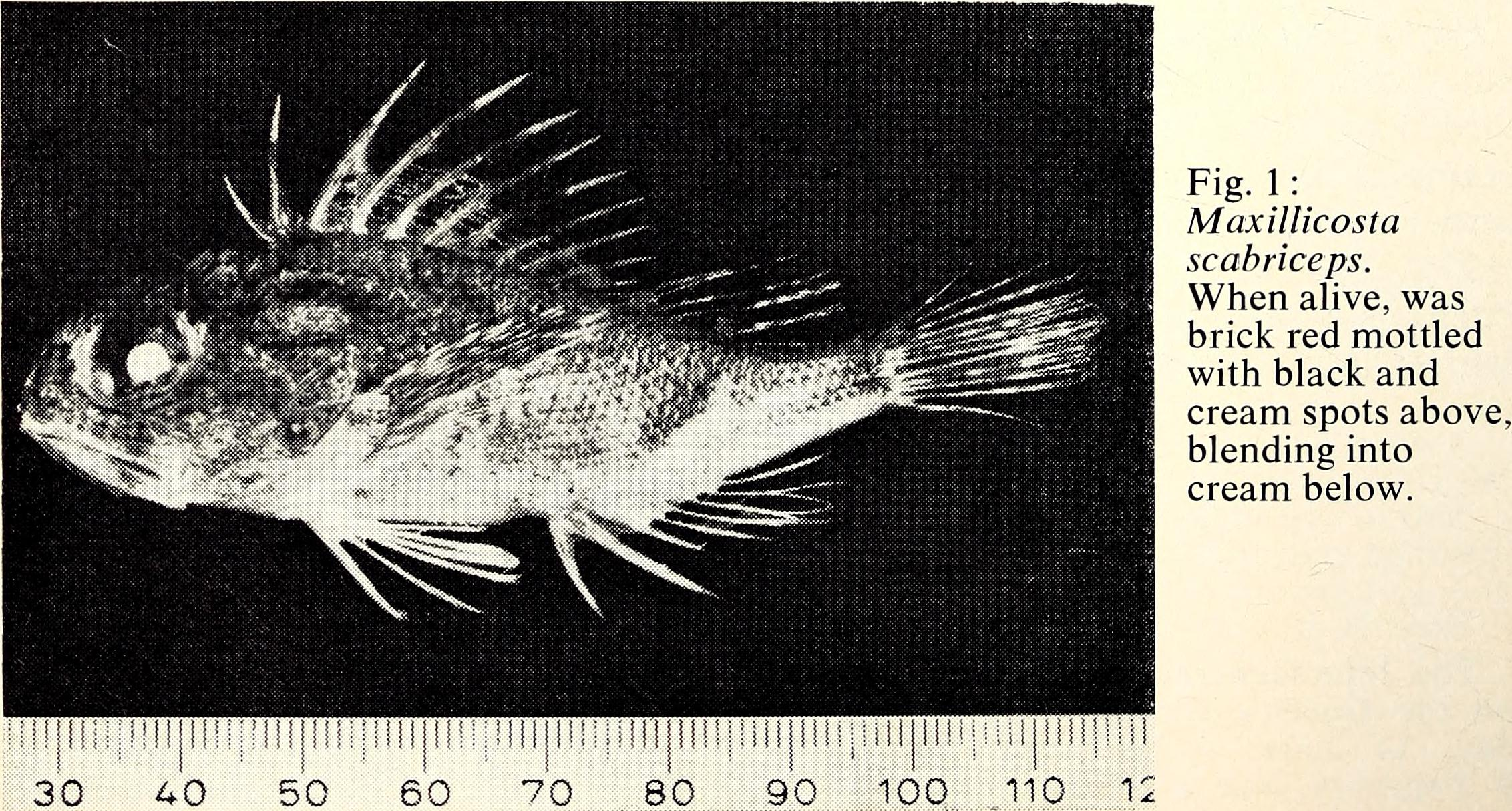
- Maxillicosta scabriceps

Scientific classification
- Kingdom: Animalia
- Phylum: Chordata
- Class: Actinopterygii
- Order: Perciformes
- Subfamily: Neosebastidae
- Genus: Maxillicosta; Whitley, 1935

Type species
- Maxillicosta scabriceps Whitley, 1935

= Maxillicosta =

Genus of fishes

Maxillicosta is a genus of marine ray-finned fishes, belonging to the subfamily Neosebastinae, the gurnard scorpionfishes, part of the family Scorpaenidae. They are native to the eastern Indian Ocean and the western Pacific Ocean.

== Taxonomy ==
Maxillicosta was first described as a genus in 1935 by the Australian ichthyologist Gilbert Percy Whitley when he described M. scabriceps, with its type locality given as Kingscote on Kangaroo Island in South Australia, as a monotypic genus but he also explicitly designated M scabriceps as its type species. The name of the genus Maxillicosta was chosen by Whitley as the type species had a scaleless maxilla crossed by five ridges, costa in contract to the scaled maxilla of Neosebastes.

== Species ==
There are currently six recognized species in this genus:

- Maxillicosta lopholepis Eschmeyer & Poss, 1976 (Bigeye gurnard perch)
- Maxillicosta meridianus Motomura, Last & M. F. Gomon, 2006 (Southern gurnard perch)
- Maxillicosta raoulensis Eschmeyer & Poss, 1976 (Red little gurnard perch)
- Maxillicosta reticulata (F. de Buen, 1961)
- Maxillicosta scabriceps Whitley, 1935 (Little gurnard perch)
- Maxillicosta whitleyi Eschmeyer & Poss, 1976 (Whitley's gurnard perch)

== Characteristics ==
Maxillicosta gurnard perches are small scorpaenid fishes that possess an expanded rear surface of the maxillary and the outer surface of the dentary has a number of clear, horizontal ridges. The maxillary, intraorbital and occipital areas of the head have no scales. They have 20-27 fin rays in the pectoral fins. Some of them do not have a swim bladder. The smallest species is Whitley's gurnard perch which has a maximum total length of 7 cm (2.8 in) while the largest is the little gurnard perch which has a maximum total length of 12 cm (4.7 in).

== Distribution ==
Maxillicosta gurnard perches are found in the southwestern Pacific Ocean and southeastern Indian Ocean with one species, M. reticulata, found in the Desventuradas Islands and Juan Fernández Islands in the southeastern Pacific.
