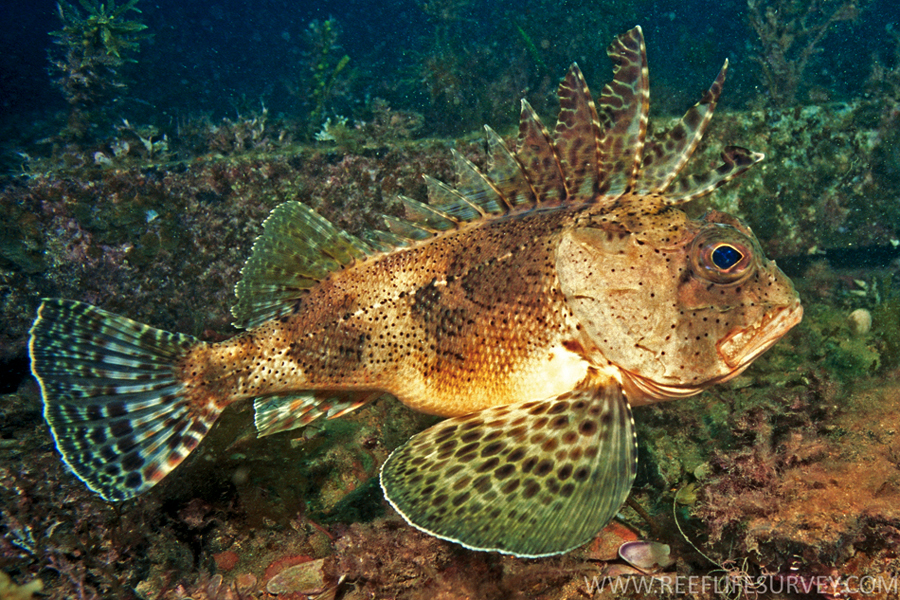
- Neosebastes pandus

Scientific classification
- Kingdom: Animalia
- Phylum: Chordata
- Class: Actinopterygii
- Order: Perciformes
- Suborder: Scorpaenoidei
- Subfamily: Neosebastidae; Matsubara, 1943

Genera
- see text

= Neosebastidae =

Family of ray-finned fishes

Neosebastidae, the gurnard scorpionfishes or gurnard perches, is a small family of deep-sea ray-finned fishes. It is part of the suborder Scorpaenoidei within the order Perciformes. These fishes are found in the Indian and Pacific oceans. Several of the species in this family are venomous.

== Taxonomy ==
Neosebastinae, or the family Neosebastidae, was first described as a taxon by the Japanese ichthyologist Kiyomatsu Matsubara in 1943. The grouping is treated as a subfamily of the Scorpaenidae within the order Scorpaeniformes by the 5th Edition of Fishes of the World. More recently, other authorities, such as FishBase and Eschmeyer's Catalog of Fishes, regard the taxon as a family within the suborder Scorpaenoidei, part of the Perciformes.

The family name is derived from the genus name Neosebastes which is a compound of neo meaning "new" and Sebastes, as, when he coined the name, Alphonse Guichenot thought that the new genus was closely related to or was a subgenus of the genus Sebastes.

== Genera ==
There are two genera which are classified in Neosebastidae:

- Maxillicosta Whitley, 1935
- Neosebastes Guichenot, 1867

== Characteristics ==
Neosebastidae, the gurnard perches, have a prominent head with large eyes and a large mouth. There are strong bony ridges and spines on the head and cheeks. Much of the body and head are covered in rough ctenoid scales. They have 13 long and robust venom bearing spines in the dorsal fin and 6-8 soft rays. They vary in size from a maximum total length of 50 cm (20 in) in the bighead gurnard perch (Neosebastes pandus) down to a maximum total length of 7 cm (2.8 in) in Whitley's gurnard perch (Maxillicosta whitleyi).

== Distribution, habitat and biology ==
Neosebastidae are found in the eastern Indian Ocean and the western Pacific Ocean where they have an antiequatorial distribution in temperate and subtropical waters either side of the equator. They are benthic fishes living on soft substrates and feed on small fishes and crustaceans. They are oviparous, and, in at least N. pandus the females are larger than the males and the larger females have higher fecundity,
