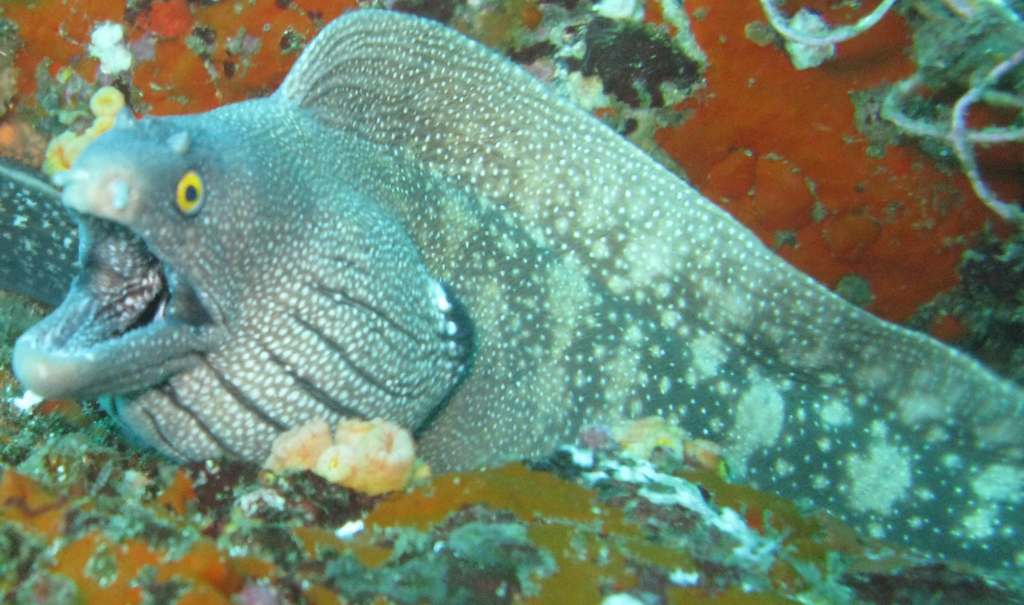

Conservation status
- Least Concern (IUCN 3.1)

Scientific classification
- Kingdom: Animalia
- Phylum: Chordata
- Class: Actinopterygii
- Order: Anguilliformes
- Family: Muraenidae
- Genus: Muraena
- Species: M. argus

Binomial name
- Muraena argus (Steindachner, 1870)

Synonyms
- Gymnothorax argus Steindachner, 1870

= Muraena argus =

Species of fish

Muraena argus, commonly known as the white-spotted moray, or the Argus moray, is a moray eel found in coral reefs from Mexico to Peru and around the Galápagos Islands. It was described by Franz Steindachner in 1870, originally under the genus Gymnothorax. It dwells at a depth range of 18 to 60 metres (59 to 197 ft). Males can reach a maximum total length of 120 centimetres (47 in), but more commonly reach a TL of 60 centimetres (24 in).

Due to its wide distribution, lack of known threats, and lack of observed population decline, the IUCN redlist currently lists M. argus as Least Concern.
