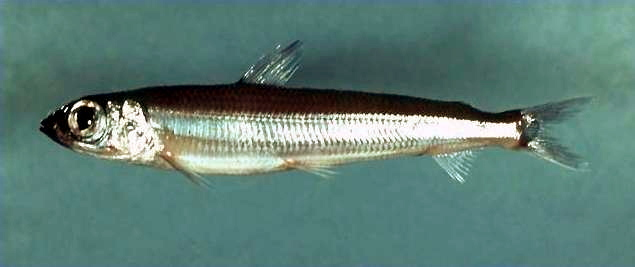
- Greater Argentine (Argentina silus)
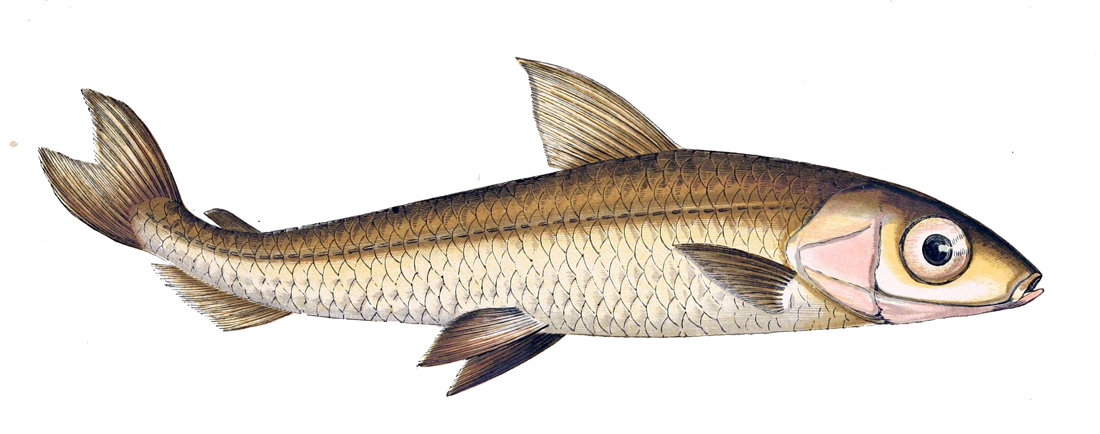
- Argentine (Argentina sphyraena)

Scientific classification
- Kingdom: Animalia
- Phylum: Chordata
- Class: Actinopterygii
- Division: Teleostei
- Order: Argentiniformes
- Family: Argentinidae
- Genus: Argentina; Linnaeus, 1758

Species
- See text

= Argentina (fish) =

Argentina Temporal range: Maastrichtian–present

Genus of fishes

Argentina /ɑːrdʒənˈtaɪnə/ is a genus of fishes in the family Argentinidae.

The earliest fossil member of this genus is Argentina voigti, known from otoliths from the Late Cretaceous (Maastrichtian) of Germany.

== Species ==
There are currently 13 recognized species in this genus:

- Argentina aliceae Cohen & Atsaides, 1969 (Alice Argentina)
- Argentina australiae Cohen, 1958
- Argentina brasiliensis Kobyliansky, 2004
- Argentina brucei Cohen & Atsaides, 1969 (Bruce's Argentine)
- Argentina elongata F. W. Hutton, 1879
- Argentina euchus Cohen, 1961
- Argentina georgei Cohen & Atsaides, 1969
- Argentina kagoshimae D. S. Jordan & Snyder, 1902
- Argentina sialis C. H. Gilbert, 1890 (North-Pacific Argentine)
- Argentina silus (Ascanius, 1775) (Greater Argentine)
- Argentina sphyraena Linnaeus, 1758 (Argentine)
- Argentina stewarti Cohen & Atsaides, 1969
- Argentina striata Goode & T. H. Bean, 1896 (Striated Argentine)
