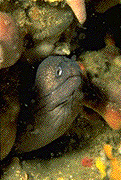

Conservation status
- Least Concern (IUCN 3.1)

Scientific classification
- Kingdom: Animalia
- Phylum: Chordata
- Class: Actinopterygii
- Division: Teleostei
- Order: Anguilliformes
- Family: Muraenidae
- Genus: Muraena
- Species: M. retifera

Binomial name
- Muraena retifera Goode & T. H. Bean, 1882

= Reticulate moray =

Species of fish

The reticulate moray (Muraena retifera) is a moray eel with pharyngeal jaws. It is part of the genus Muraena.

It is native to the southeastern United States, the Bay of Campeche and the Leeward Antilles.
