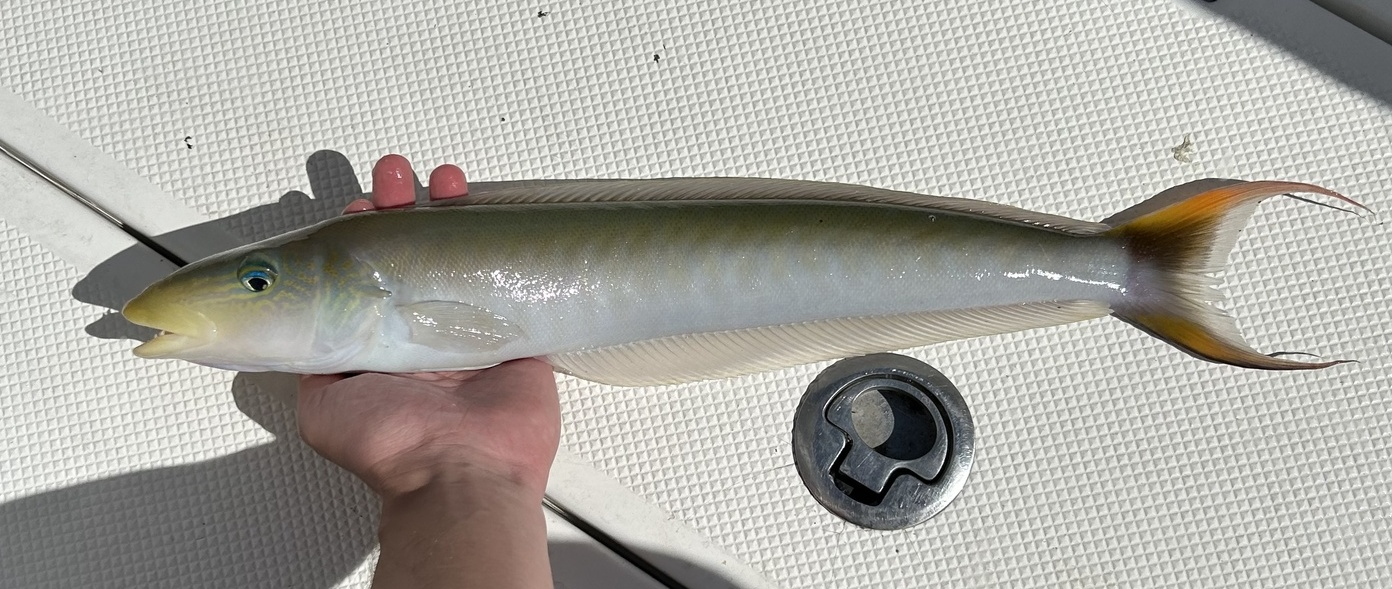

Conservation status
- Least Concern (IUCN 3.1)

Scientific classification
- Kingdom: Animalia
- Phylum: Chordata
- Class: Actinopterygii
- Order: Acanthuriformes
- Family: Malacanthidae
- Genus: Malacanthus
- Species: M. plumieri

Binomial name
- Malacanthus plumieri (Bloch, 1786)

Synonyms
- Coryphaena plumieri Bloch, 1786; Malacanthus trachinus Valenciennes, 1841; Dikellorhynchus tropidolepis Berry, 1958

= Malacanthus plumieri =

Species of fish

Malacanthus plumieri, the sand tilefish, is a species of marine ray-finned fish, a tilefish belonging to the family Malacanthidae. It is found in the western Atlantic Ocean.

== Description ==
Malacanthus plumieri has a highly elongated, slightly compressed body with a slender, rounded head. There is a large, sharp spine at the corner of the gill cover. This species varies in colour from yellowish white to pale bluish gray. The head has pale yellow and bluish markings. The dorsal and anal fins are long. The caudal fin is lunate and is mainly yellow in colour with a dark blotch on the lower part of the upper lobe. This species has 4–5 spines and 53–57 soft rays in its dorsal fin while the anal fin has 1 spine and 50–52 soft rays. The maximum recorded total length is 70 cm (28 in), although 50 cm (20 in) is more typical. They can weigh up to 1 kg (2.2 lb).

== Distribution ==
Malacanthus plumieri is found in the western Atlantic Ocean. It ranges from Cape Lookout in North Carolina and Bermuda in the north southwards along the coast of the United States to the Bahamas, into the Gulf of Mexico where it has been recorded from the Florida Keys, along the shoreline of the Florida panhandle as far as eastern Louisiana, the Flower Garden Banks and the surrounding area, it also occurs from Tuxpan and along the Yucatan Peninsula and around Cuba. It can be found widely in the Caribbean Sea, and on the coast of Brazil from the mouth of the Amazon River mouth south to Uruguay. They are absent from the coasts from the mouth of the Orinoco River to the Amazon. It is also known from Trindade Island off Brazil and Ascension Island in the eastern Atlantic.

== Habitat and biology ==
Malacanthus plumieri is found at depths between 3 and 153 m (10 and 502 ft). it is mainly a benthic inhabitant of shallow waters where the substrate is predominantly rubble or sand. Here it creates mounds of rubble or shell fragments in the vicinity of reefs and beds of sea grass. When alarmed it dives head first into its mound. They feed mainly on stomatopods, fishes, polychaetes, chitons, sea urchins, starfish, amphipods and decapods, especially shrimp. It spends long periods hovering over its mound, undulating the long dorsal and anal fins. They are territorial, the territories of males overlap with those of the females. They spawn as pairs, the male approaches the female in an undulating motion, the pair then rises up the water column in a crisscrossing pattern, ending with the pair swimming while quivering with the gametes being released at the zenith.

== Systematics ==
Malacanthus plumieri was first formally described in 1786 as Coryphaena plumieri by the German naturalist Marcus Elieser Bloch (1723–1799) with the type locality given as the Antilles. When George's Cuvier created the genus Malacanthus he named Bloch's Coryphaena plumieri as its type species. The specific name honours the Franciscan friar and naturalist Charles Plumier (1664–1704), Bloch based his description of this species on a drawing by Plumier.

== Utilisation ==
Malacanthus plumieri is eaten fresh, and it is normally caught as bycatch. It also occasionally appears in the aquarium trade.
