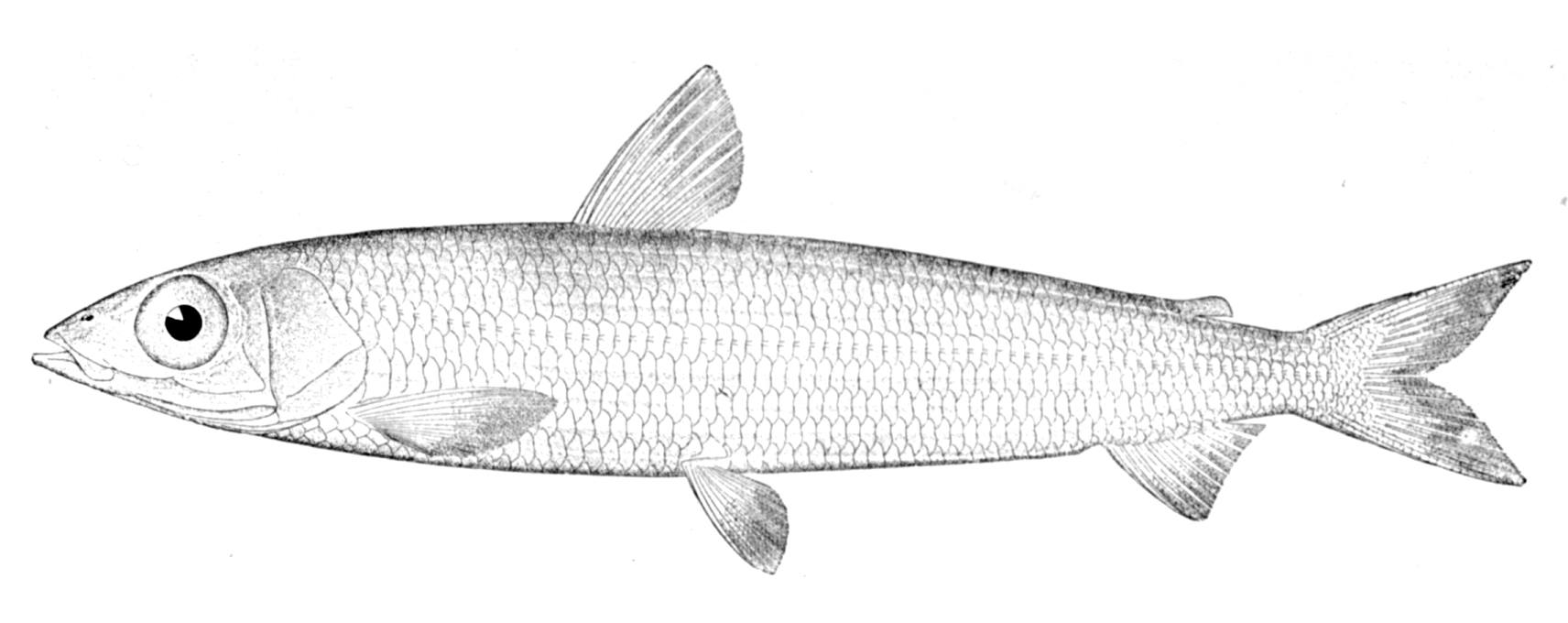

Scientific classification
- Kingdom: Animalia
- Phylum: Chordata
- Class: Actinopterygii
- Order: Argentiniformes
- Family: Argentinidae
- Genus: Argentina
- Species: A. silus

Binomial name
- Argentina silus (Ascanius, 1775)

= Greater argentine =

Species of fish

The greater argentine (Argentina silus; synonymous with Salmo silus), also known as the Atlantic argentine, great silver smelt, herring smelt or simply smelt, is a northern Atlantic herring smelt and can be found at depths from 140 to 1,440 metres (460 to 4,720 ft). This species reaches a length of 70.0 centimetres (27.6 in) SL. It is of commercial importance and it is used as seafood.

== Distribution and habitat ==
Argentina silus lives in the bathypelagic zone from depths of 140 to 1,440 metres (460 to 4,720 ft). In the Eastern Atlantic Ocean it can be found from Svalbard to the west coasts of Scotland and Ireland, and in the Western Atlantic it can be found from Davis Strait to George's Bank.

== Gallery ==
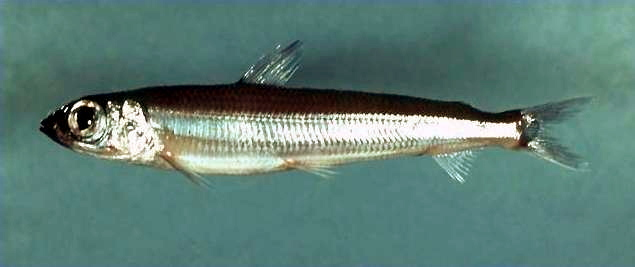

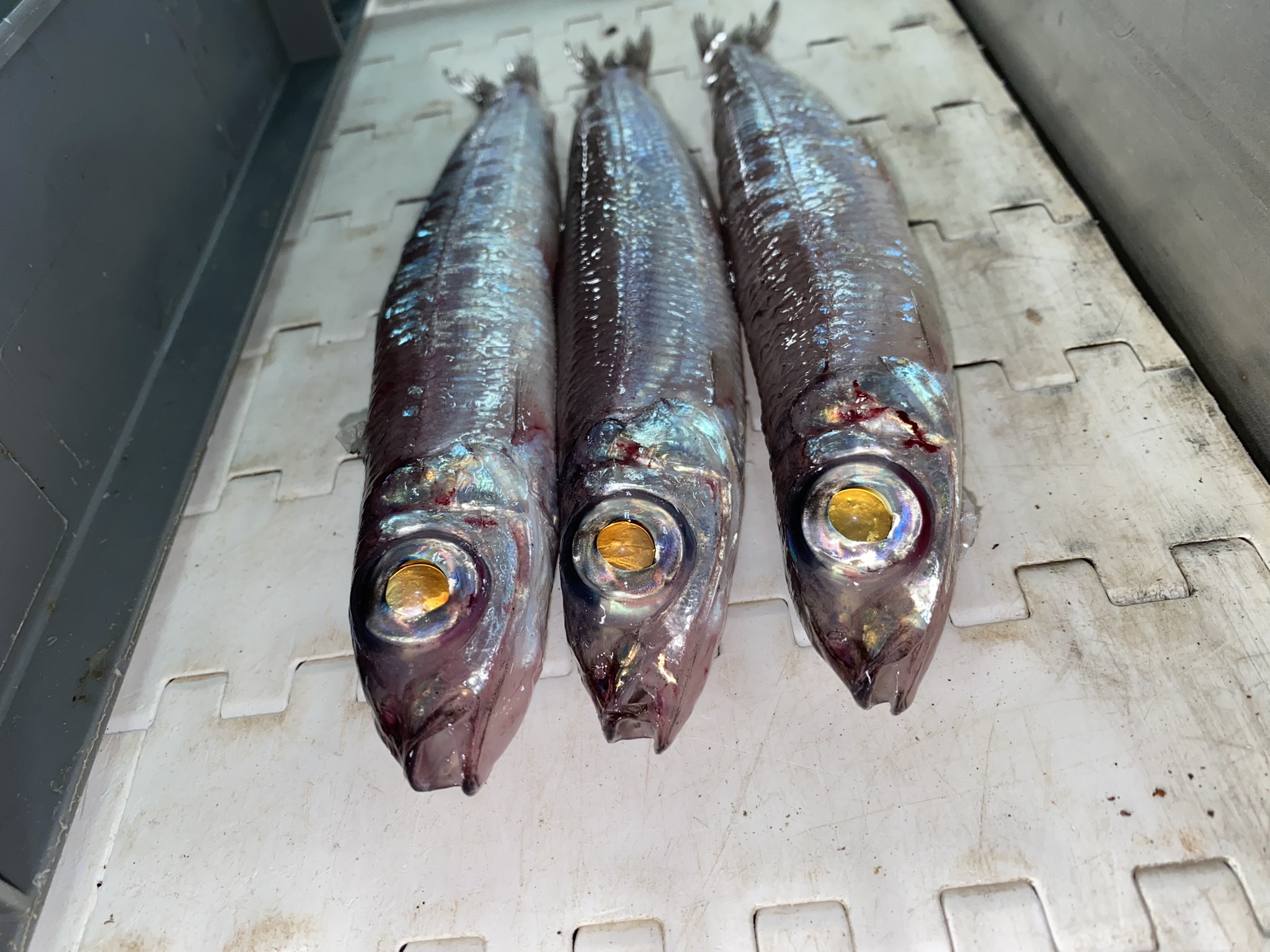
Eyes of Argentina silus illuminated by camera flash, showing reflections from the tapetum lucidum.
