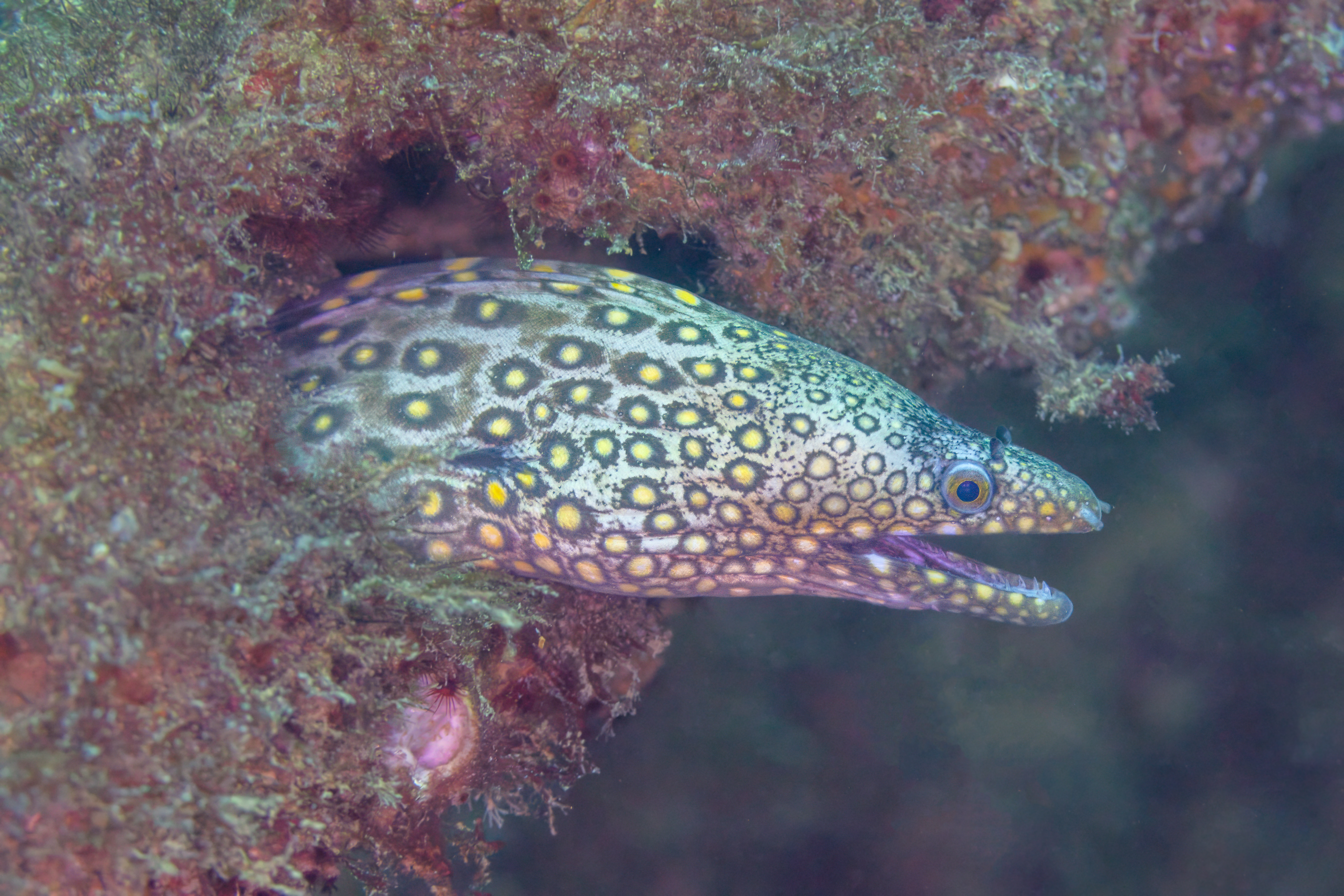
- M. lentiginosa photographed in Mexico

Conservation status
- Least Concern (IUCN 3.1)

Scientific classification
- Kingdom: Animalia
- Phylum: Chordata
- Class: Actinopterygii
- Division: Teleostei
- Order: Anguilliformes
- Family: Muraenidae
- Genus: Muraena
- Species: M. lentiginosa

Binomial name
- Muraena lentiginosa Jenyns, 1842

Synonyms
- Muraena insularum D. S. Jordan & B. M. Davis, 1891

= Muraena lentiginosa =

Species of fish

Muraena lentiginosa, the jewel moray, is a moray eel from the Eastern Pacific. It occasionally makes its way into the aquarium trade. It grows to a size of 61 centimetres (2 ft 0 in) in length.

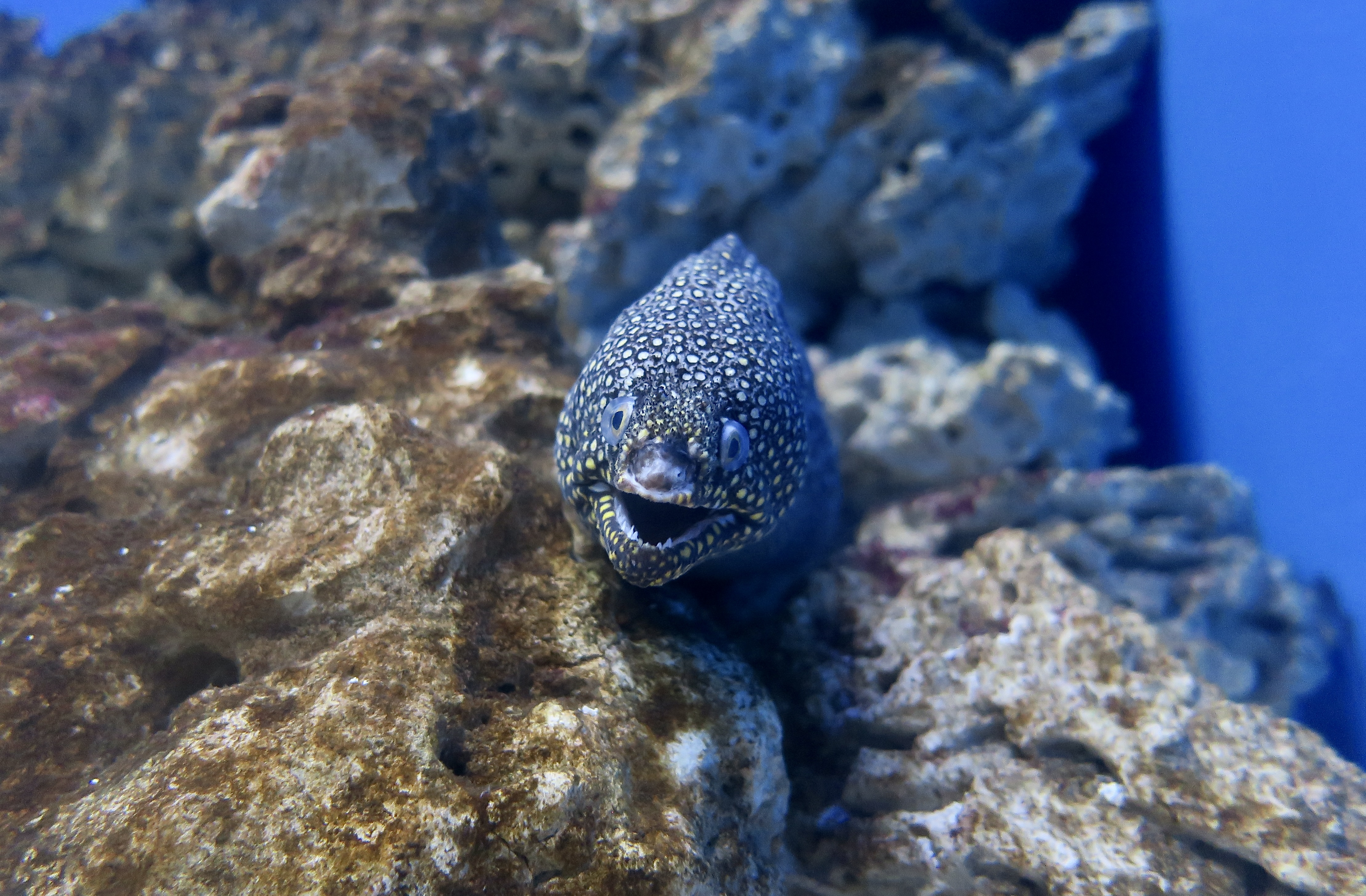
Front view at Arizona-Sonora Desert Museum.
