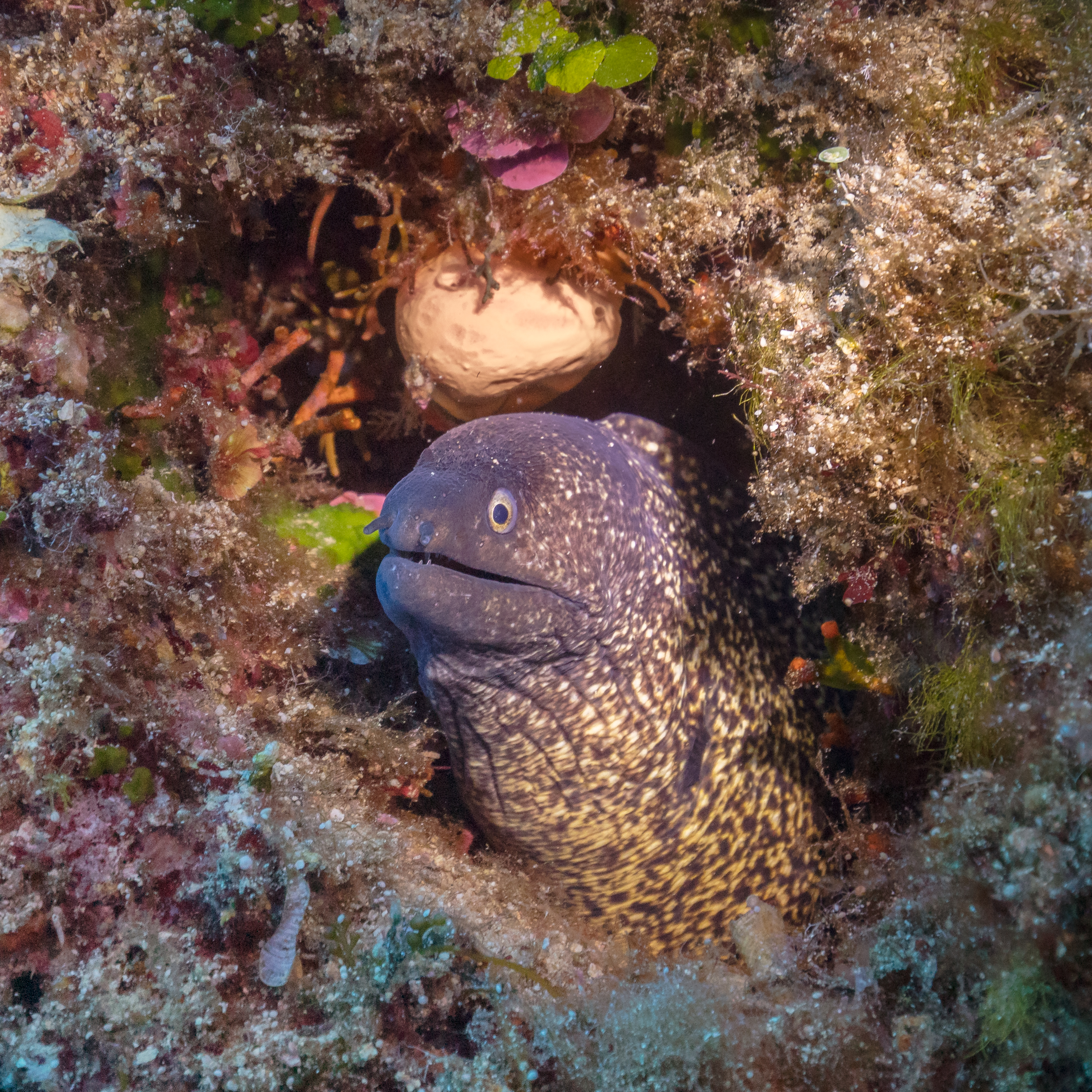

Conservation status
- Least Concern (IUCN 3.1)

Scientific classification
- Kingdom: Animalia
- Phylum: Chordata
- Class: Actinopterygii
- Division: Teleostei
- Order: Anguilliformes
- Family: Muraenidae
- Genus: Muraena
- Species: M. helena

Binomial name
- Muraena helena Linnaeus, 1758

Synonyms
- List: Muraenophis helena (Linnaeus, 1758); Muraena helaena Linnaeus, 1758 (misspelling); Gymnothorax muraena Bloch & Schneider, 1801; Muraena romana Shaw, 1803; Muraena punctata Rafinesque, 1810; Muraena variegata Rafinesque, 1810; Muraenophis fulva Risso, 1810; Muraena guttata Risso, 1827; Limamuraena guttata (Risso, 1827); Muraena helena australiae Richardson, 1848; Muraena australiae Richardson, 1848; Thyrsoidea atlantica Johnson, 1862; Muraena vorax Ogilby, 1907; Muraena bettencourti Osório, 1911; Muraenophis bettencourti (Osório, 1911); Murenophis bettencourti (Osório, 1911)

= Mediterranean moray =

Species of Mediterranean fish

The Mediterranean moray (Muraena helena) is a species of fish in the Muraenidae family. It has a long eel-like body and is found in the eastern Atlantic Ocean and Mediterranean Sea. Its bite can be dangerous to humans.

== Appearance and characteristics ==
The Mediterranean moray has an elongated, eel-like body and can reach a length of 1.5 metres (4 ft 11 in) and weigh over 15 kilograms. Its coloration varies from dark grey to dark brown with fine dark spots. The skin is slimy and without scales. The dorsal fin begins behind its head and continues to the caudal fin (fused with the anal fin). Pectoral fins are absent, teeth are long and sharp-pointed (like other morays), and the mouth is long and robust and reaches behind the gills.

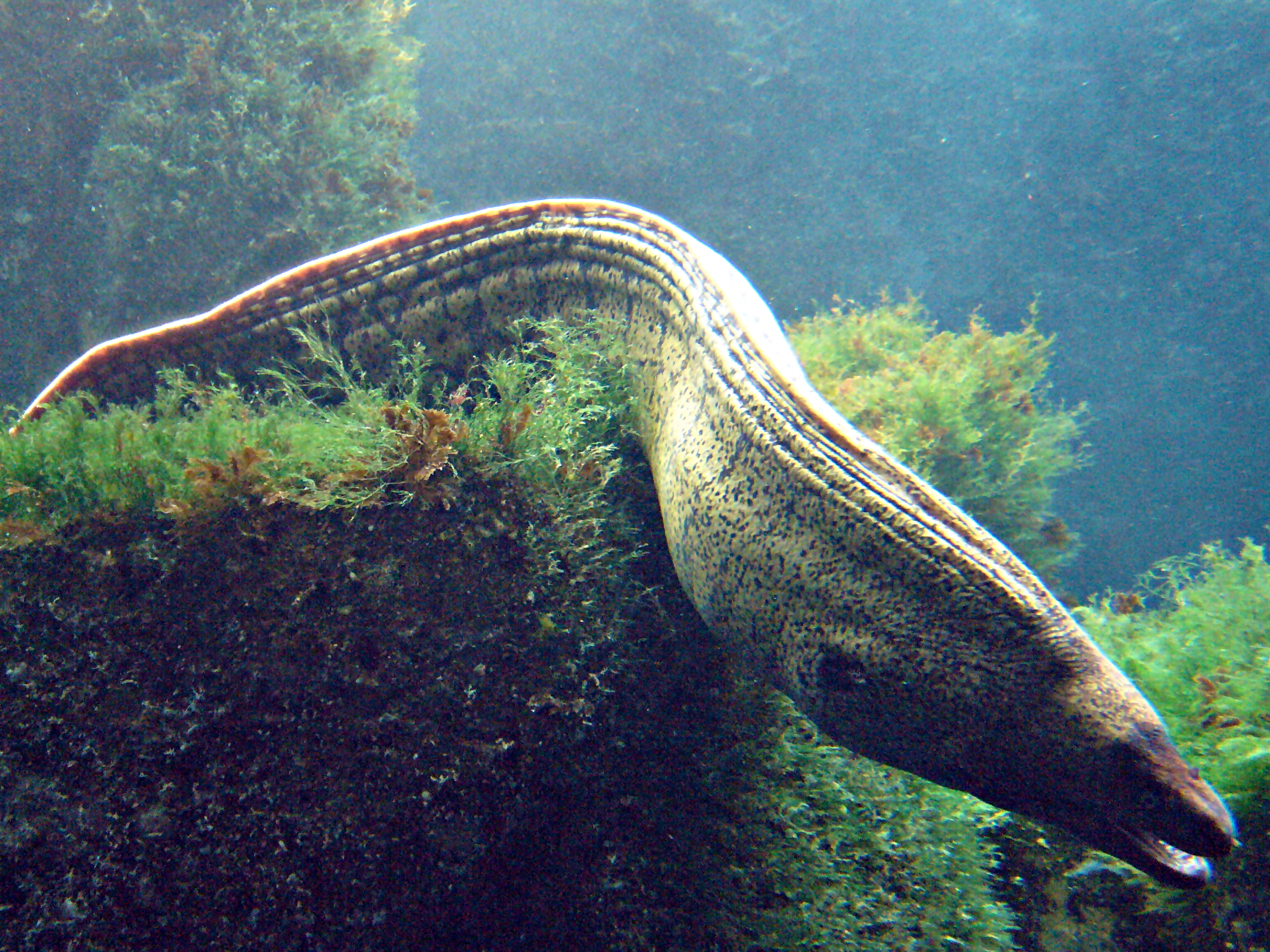
Muraena helena showing typical moray eel morphology: robust anguilliform shape, lack of pectoral fins and circular gill openings

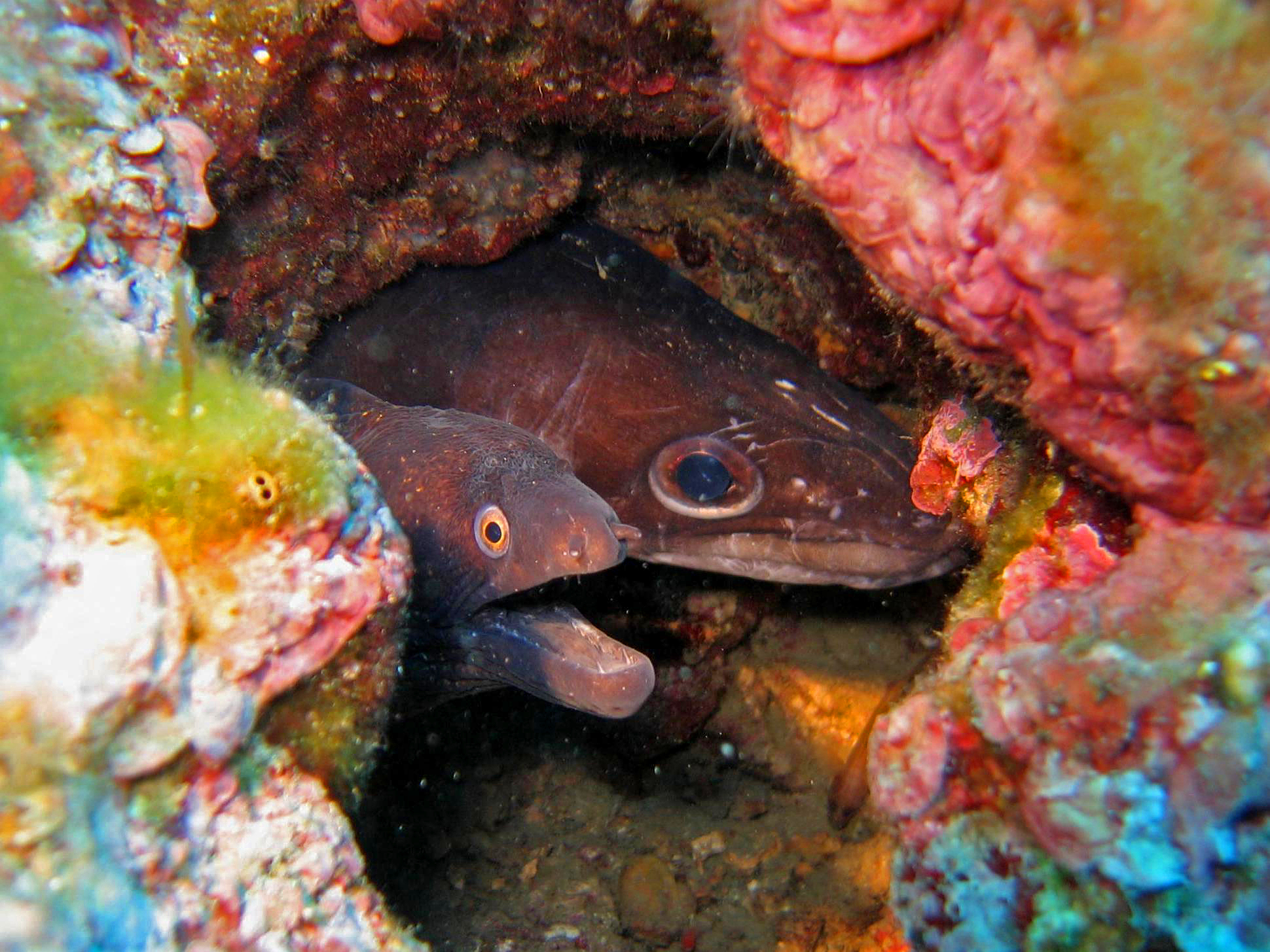
A Mediterranean moray (left) sharing a hole with a conger eel (Conger conger) off the coast of Portofino

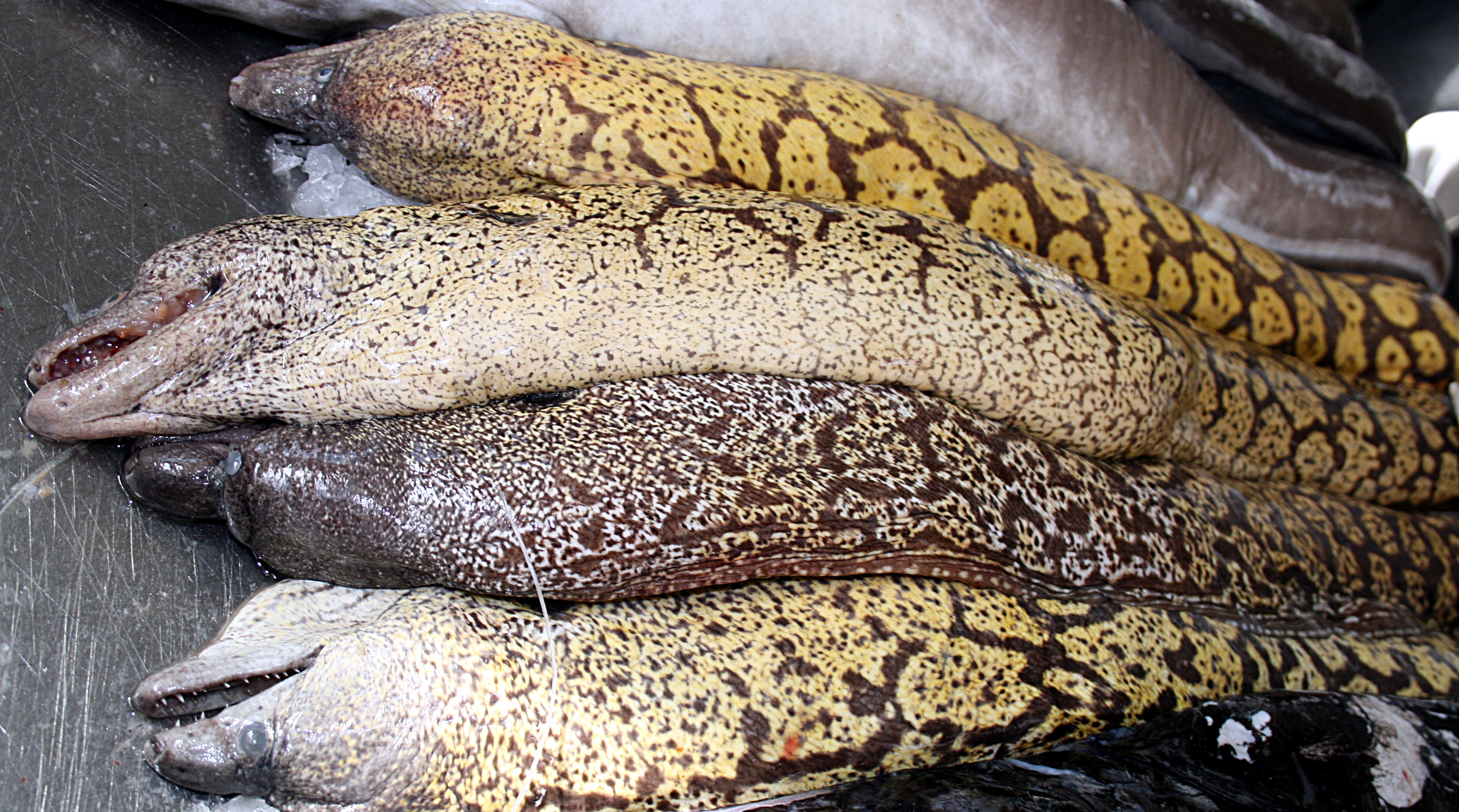
Captured morays on fish market in Madeira

== Ecology ==
The Mediterranean moray inhabits the coastal waters of the eastern Atlantic Ocean from the British Isles to the coast of Senegal; the waters of the Canary Islands and the Azores; and the Mediterranean Sea. It prefers rocky bottoms and lives at depths between 1 and 801 metres with the 100–300 m range the most common habitat. It is a solitary and territorial species. The Mediterranean moray spends most of the day in cavities and clefts between rocks and is more active at night. It hunts fish, crabs and cephalopods, but also feeds on dead animals.

Similar to well-documented interspecific, coordinated hunting associations between groupers and moray eels in tropical regions, such as the Red Sea, a similar interaction has also been observed in the Mediterranean. In the Bay of Argentiera in Sardinia, a coordinated hunting association between the dusky grouper (Epinephelus marginatus) and the Mediterranean moray was documented.

== Human importance ==
Historic evidence of human consumption of Mediterranean morays dates to the Middle Pleistocene during the Last Interglacial, where the Neanderthal site at Gruta da Figueira Brava, Portugal, shows evidence of recurring capture and eating of morays alongside other eel species such as European eels and European congers.

The bite of the Mediterranean moray can be dangerous mainly due to the mildly toxic slime of its skin. It can be utilized fresh and eaten broiled, boiled and baked. The skin can be used for leather.

== Reproduction ==
Sex and maturity is determined by visual observations of the gonads. Mature females have large orange eggs, while mature males have white and large testes. Mediterranean eels found in the Adriatic Sea mature in the warmer months, and then give birth in the summer. The colder months is their resting period. They spawn about 60,000 eggs into open water, from which planktonic transparent leptocephali hatch.

The act of reproduction for eels is widely unknown, as it has never been observed in the wild. Mediterranean eels are no different, however, it is confirmed that eels reproduce by external fertilization.

== Parasites ==
One parasitic crustacean, the trematode Folliculovarium mediterraneum and the flatworm Lecithochirium grandiporum are parasites of the Mediterranean moray.
