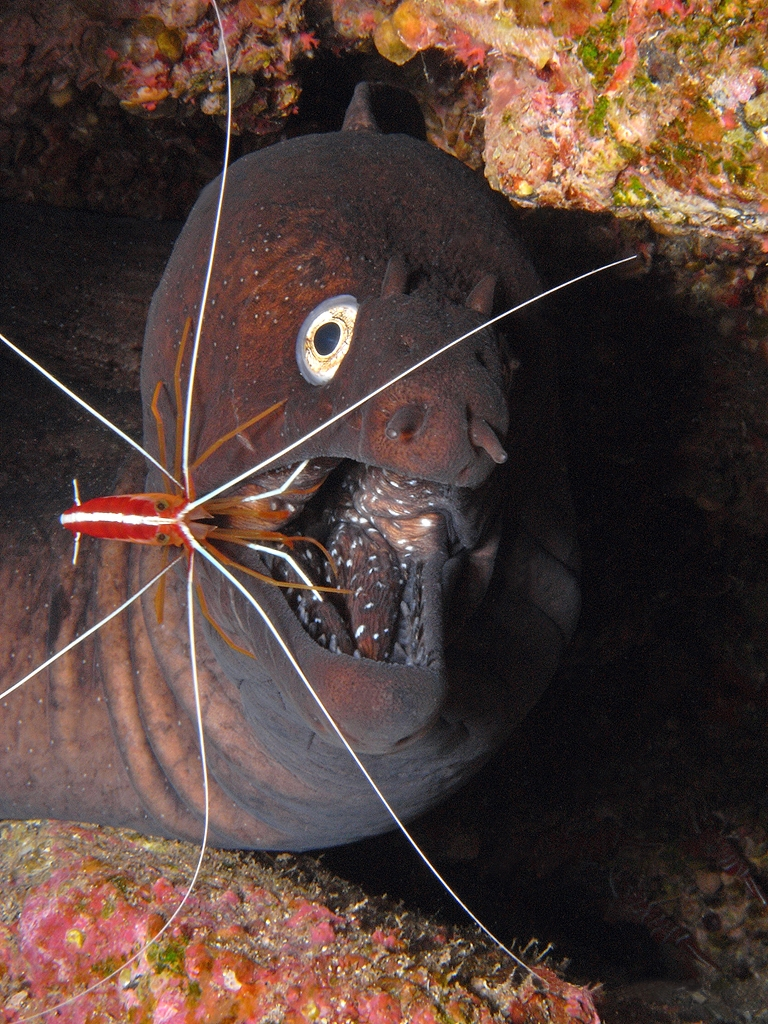
- Muraena augusti with Lysmata grabhami

Conservation status
- Least Concern (IUCN 3.1)

Scientific classification
- Kingdom: Animalia
- Phylum: Chordata
- Class: Actinopterygii
- Order: Anguilliformes
- Family: Muraenidae
- Genus: Muraena
- Species: M. augusti

Binomial name
- Muraena augusti (Kaup, 1856)
- Distribution of Muraena augusti

Synonyms
- Muraena bettencourti Osório, 1911; Muraenophis augusti (Kaup, 1856); Thyrsoidea atlantica Johnson, 1862; Thryrsoidea augusti Kaup, 1856 (misspelling); Thyrsoidea augusti Kaup, 1856

= Muraena augusti =

Species of fish

Muraena augusti is a species of moray eel found in waters surrounding Macaronesia, in the Eastern Atlantic Ocean. This moray eel occurs at a depth range of 0–250 m (0–820 ft), and is most often found between 0–50 m (0–164 ft).

This species was first described by Johann Jakob Kaup in 1856 under the genus Thyrsoidea and latter transferred to Muraena.
