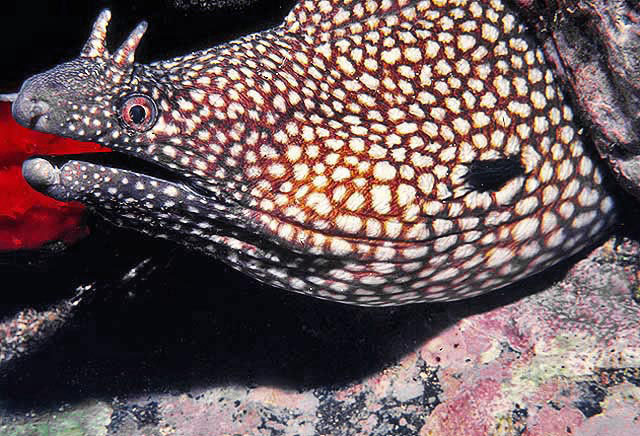
- Muraena pavonina at Ascension Island

Conservation status
- Least Concern (IUCN 3.1)

Scientific classification
- Kingdom: Animalia
- Phylum: Chordata
- Class: Actinopterygii
- Order: Anguilliformes
- Family: Muraenidae
- Genus: Muraena
- Species: M. pavonina

Binomial name
- Muraena pavonina J. Richardson, 1845
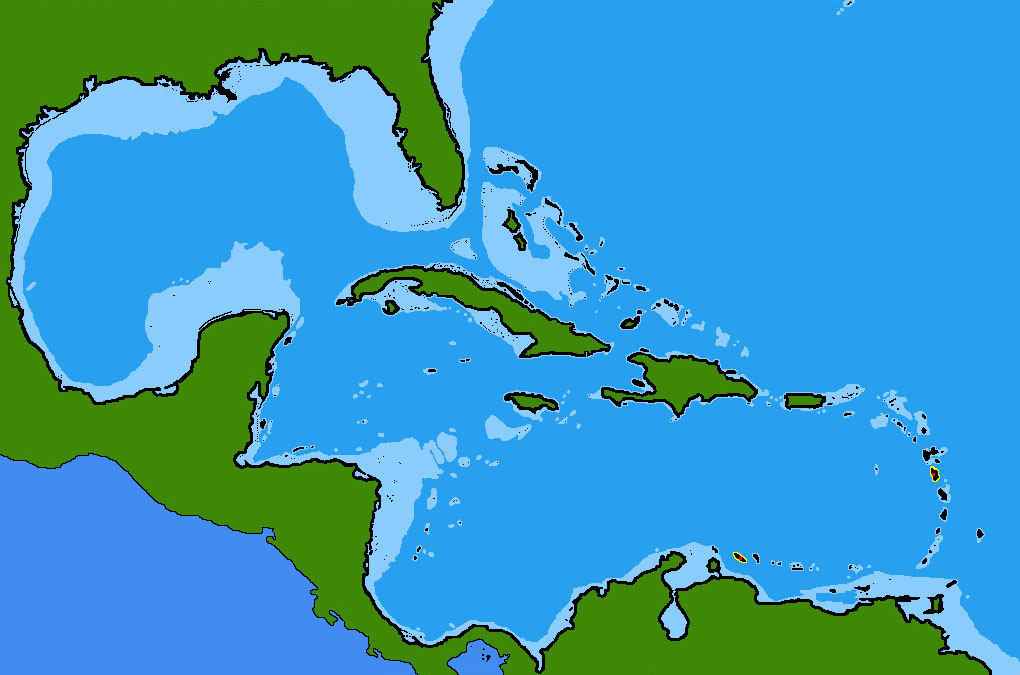

= Muraena pavonina =

Species of fish

Muraena pavonina (whitespot moray) is a moray eel that occurs in the western and eastern Atlantic Ocean. It is found in holes and crevices at depth 2–60 m. This species has a maximum length of 51.2 cm (20.2 in).
