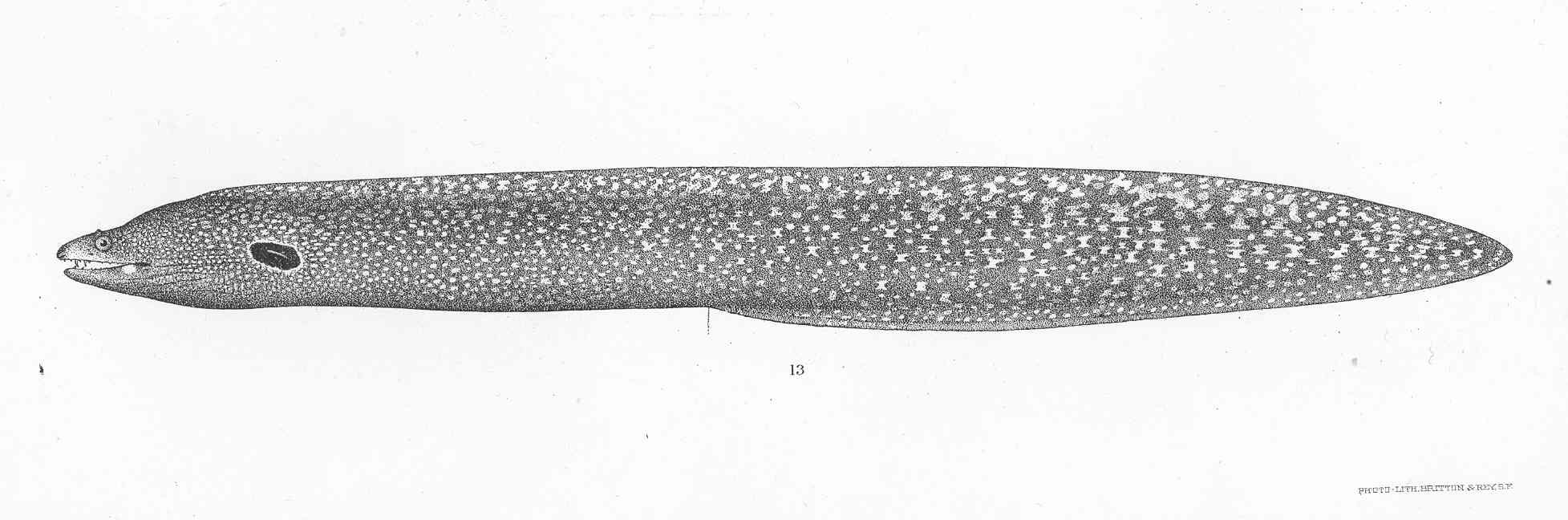

Conservation status
- Least Concern (IUCN 3.1)

Scientific classification
- Kingdom: Animalia
- Phylum: Chordata
- Class: Actinopterygii
- Order: Anguilliformes
- Family: Muraenidae
- Genus: Muraena
- Species: M. clepsydra

Binomial name
- Muraena clepsydra C. H. Gilbert, 1898

= Muraena clepsydra =

Hourglass moray

Species of fish

Muraena clepsydra, commonly known as the hourglass moray, is a moray eel found in coral reefs from the Gulf of California to Peru, and the Galapagos Islands. It was described by Charles Henry Gilbert in 1898. It dwells at a depth range of 0 to 25 metres (0 to 82 ft). Males can reach a maximum total length of 120 centimetres (47 in), but more commonly reach a TL of 60 centimetres (24 in).

Due to its wide distribution, lack of known threats, and lack of observed population decline, the IUCN redlist currently lists M. clepsydra as Least Concern.
