= Glossanodon =

Glossanodon Temporal range: Early Eocene-Recent ~48.6–0 Ma

Scientific classification
- Domain: Eukaryota
- Kingdom: Animalia
- Phylum: Chordata
- Class: Actinopterygii
- Order: Argentiniformes
- Family: Argentinidae
- Genus: Glossanodon; Guichenot 1867

Species
- See text

Synonyms
- Proargentina Danil'chenko 1960

Genus of fishes

Glossanodon is a genus of fishes in the family Argentinidae.

== Extant species ==
There are currently 15 recognized extant species in this genus:

- Glossanodon australis Kobyliansky, 1998 (Southern herring smelt)
- Glossanodon danieli Parin & Shcherbachev, 1982
- Glossanodon elongatus Kobyliansky, 1998
- Glossanodon kotakamaru Endo & Nashida, 2010 (Kotaka’s argentine)
- Glossanodon leioglossus (Valenciennes, 1848) (Small-toothed argentine)
- Glossanodon lineatus (Matsubara, 1943)
- Glossanodon melanomanus Kobyliansky, 1998
- Glossanodon microcephalus Endo & Nashida, 2012
- Glossanodon mildredae Cohen & Atsaides, 1969
- Glossanodon nazca Parin & Shcherbachev, 1982
- Glossanodon polli Cohen, 1958
- Glossanodon pseudolineatus Kobyliansky, 1998 (Saddled herring smelt)
- Glossanodon pygmaeus Cohen, 1958 (Pygmy argentine)
- Glossanodon semifasciatus (Kishinouye, 1904) (Deep-sea smelt)
- Glossanodon struhsakeri Cohen, 1970 (Struhsaker's deep-sea smelt)

== Fossil species ==
From the fossil record, two species are known, originally described as Proargentina inclinata (Danilt'chenko 1960) and P. nebulosa (Danilt'chenko 1962) from the Early Oligocene and Early Eocene Dabakhana Svita Formation of Georgia respectively. Jerzmanska assigned Proargentina synonymous with Glossanodon in 1968.
