= Honeycomb moray =

Muraena melanotis

Conservation status
- Least Concern (IUCN 3.1)

Scientific classification
- Kingdom: Animalia
- Phylum: Chordata
- Class: Actinopterygii
- Division: Teleostei
- Order: Anguilliformes
- Family: Muraenidae
- Genus: Muraena
- Species: M. melanotis

Binomial name
- Muraena melanotis (Kaup, 1860)

Species of fish

Muraena melanotis is a moray eel found in the eastern and western Atlantic Ocean. It is commonly known as the honeycomb moray. It grows to a maximum length of about 1 metre.

== Distribution ==
In the eastern Atlantic Ocean, this fish occurs along the coast of Africa from Mauritania to Namibia, including Cape Verde and the islands in the Gulf of Guinea. In the western Atlantic, this fish occurs in the Caribbean.
