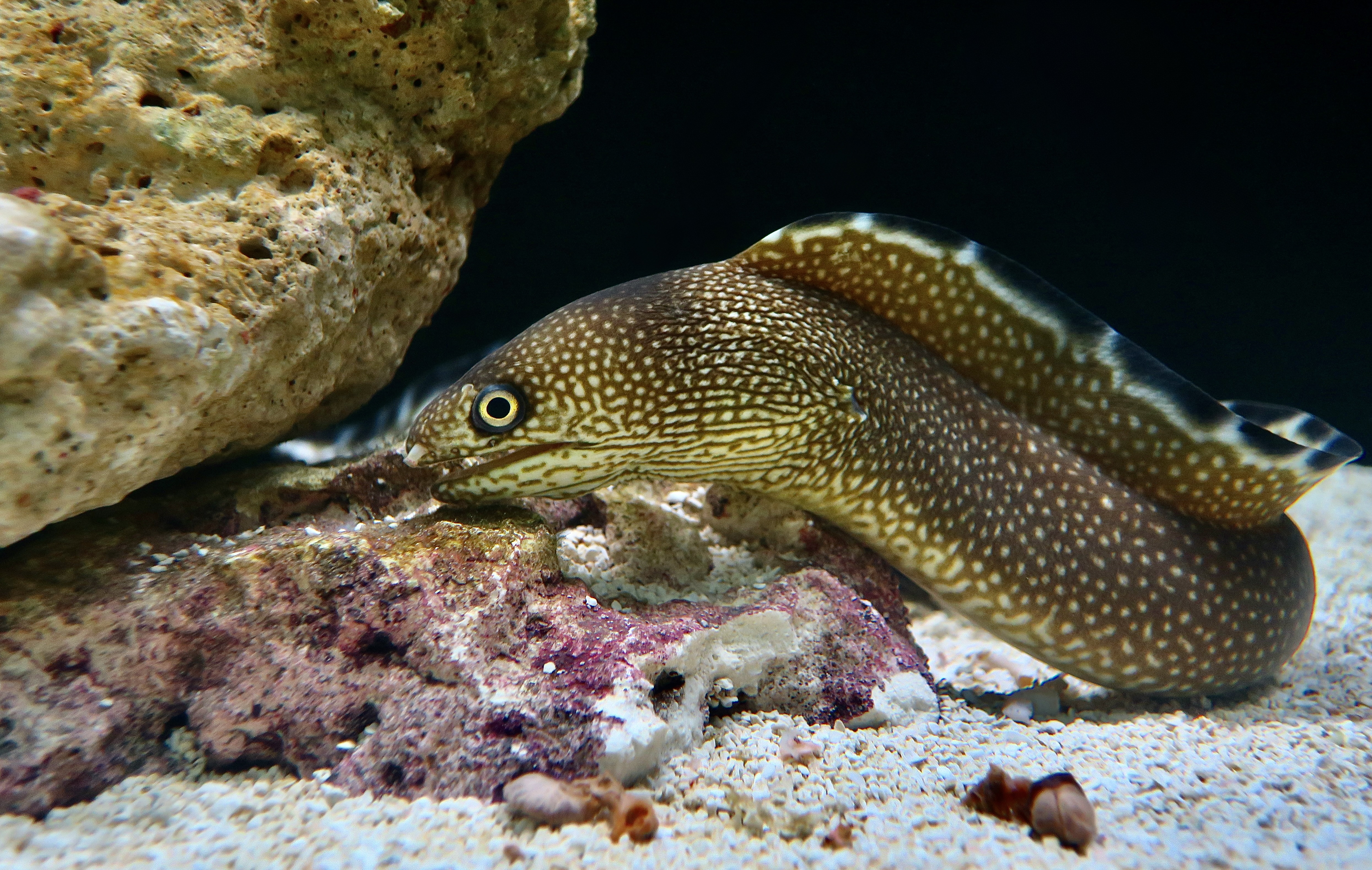

Conservation status
- Least Concern (IUCN 3.1)

Scientific classification
- Kingdom: Animalia
- Phylum: Chordata
- Class: Actinopterygii
- Division: Teleostei
- Order: Anguilliformes
- Family: Muraenidae
- Genus: Gymnothorax
- Species: G. saxicola

Binomial name
- Gymnothorax saxicola D. S. Jordan & B. M. Davis, 1891

= Ocellated moray =

Species of fish

The ocellated moray (Gymnothorax saxicola), also known as honeycomb moray, is a species of moray eel from the Western Atlantic. It occasionally is found in the aquarium trade. It grows to 60 cm in length.
