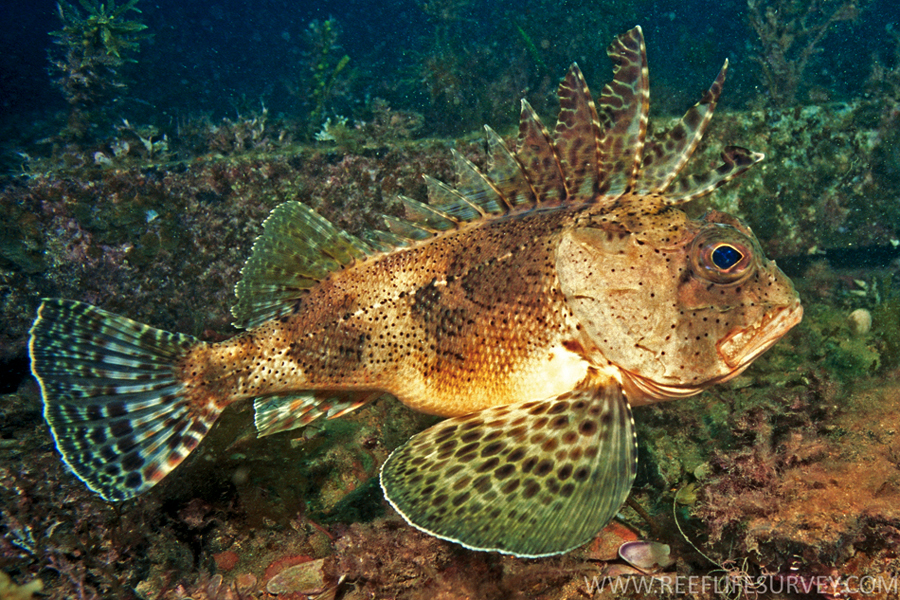
- Neosebastes pandus

Scientific classification
- Kingdom: Animalia
- Phylum: Chordata
- Class: Actinopterygii
- Order: Perciformes
- Subfamily: Neosebastidae
- Genus: Neosebastes; Guichenot, 1867

Type species
- Scorpaena panda J. Richardson, 1842

Synonyms
- Pseudosebastes Sauvage, 1875; Sebastosemus Gill, 1905

= Neosebastes =

Genus of fishes

Neosebastes is a genus of marine ray-finned fishes, belonging to the subfamily Neosebastinae, the gurnard scorpionfishes, part of the family Scorpaenidae. These fishes are found in the Indian and Pacific Ocean.

== Taxonomy ==
Neosebastes was first described as a genus in 1867 by the French zoologist Alphonse Guichenot. In 1876 Pieter Bleeker designated Scorpaena panda, which had been described by John Richardson in 1842 from Cockburn Sound in Western Australia, as the type species of the genus. The genus name is a compound of neo meaning "new" and Sebastes, as, when he coined the name, Guichenot thought that the new genus was closely related to or was a subgenus of the genus Sebastes.

== Species ==
There are currently 12 recognized species in this genus:

- Neosebastes bougainvillii (G. Cuvier, 1829) (Gulf gurnard perch)
- Neosebastes capricornis Motomura, 2004 (Capricorn gurnard perch)
- Neosebastes entaxis D. S. Jordan & Starks, 1904 (Oriental gurnard perch)
- Neosebastes incisipinnis J. D. Ogilby, 1910 (Incised gurnard perch)
- Neosebastes johnsoni Motomura, 2004 (Johnson's gurnard perch)
- Neosebastes longirostris Motomura, 2004 (Long-snout gurnard perch)
- Neosebastes multisquamus Motomura, 2004 (Ogasawara gurnard perch)
- Neosebastes nigropunctatus McCulloch, 1915 (Black-spotted gurnard perch)
- Neosebastes occidentalis Motomura, 2004 (Orange-banded gurnard perch)
- Neosebastes pandus (J. Richardson, 1842) (Rough gurnard perch)
- Neosebastes scorpaenoides Guichenot, 1867 (Ruddy gurnard perch)
- Neosebastes thetidis (Waite, 1899) (Thetis gurnard perch)
