= Muraena robusta =

Conservation status
- Least Concern (IUCN 3.1)

Scientific classification
- Kingdom: Animalia
- Phylum: Chordata
- Class: Actinopterygii
- Order: Anguilliformes
- Family: Muraenidae
- Genus: Muraena
- Species: M. robusta

Binomial name
- Muraena robusta Osório, 1911

Species of fish

Muraena robusta is a moray eel found in the eastern and central Atlantic Ocean. It reaches a maximum length of 150 centimeters, or roughly 5 feet. It is commonly known as the stout moray.
