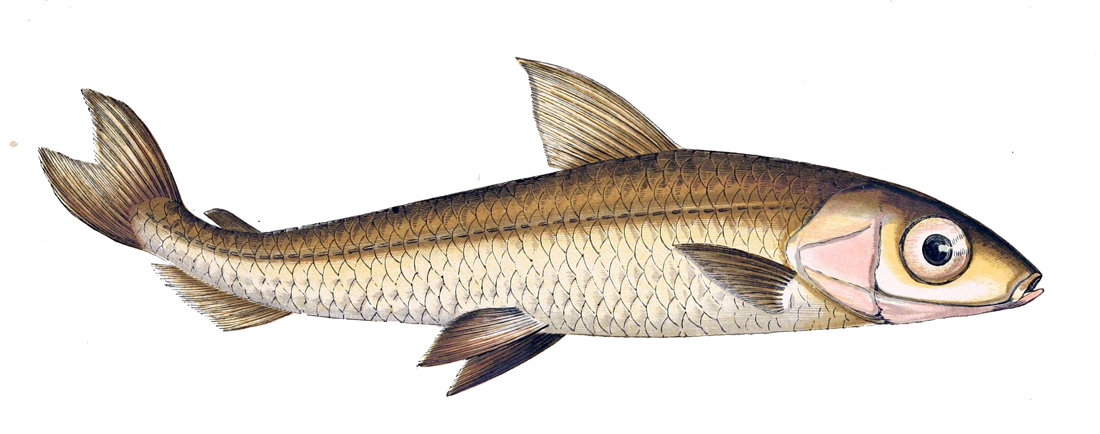
- Argentina sphyraena

Scientific classification
- Kingdom: Animalia
- Phylum: Chordata
- Class: Actinopterygii
- Order: Argentiniformes
- Family: Argentinidae; Bonaparte, 1838

Genera
- Argentina; Glossanodon

= Argentinidae =

Argentinidae Temporal range: Barremian–present

Family of ray-finned fishes

The herring smelts or argentines are a family, Argentinidae, of marine smelts. They are similar in appearance to smelts (family Osmeridae) but have much smaller mouths.

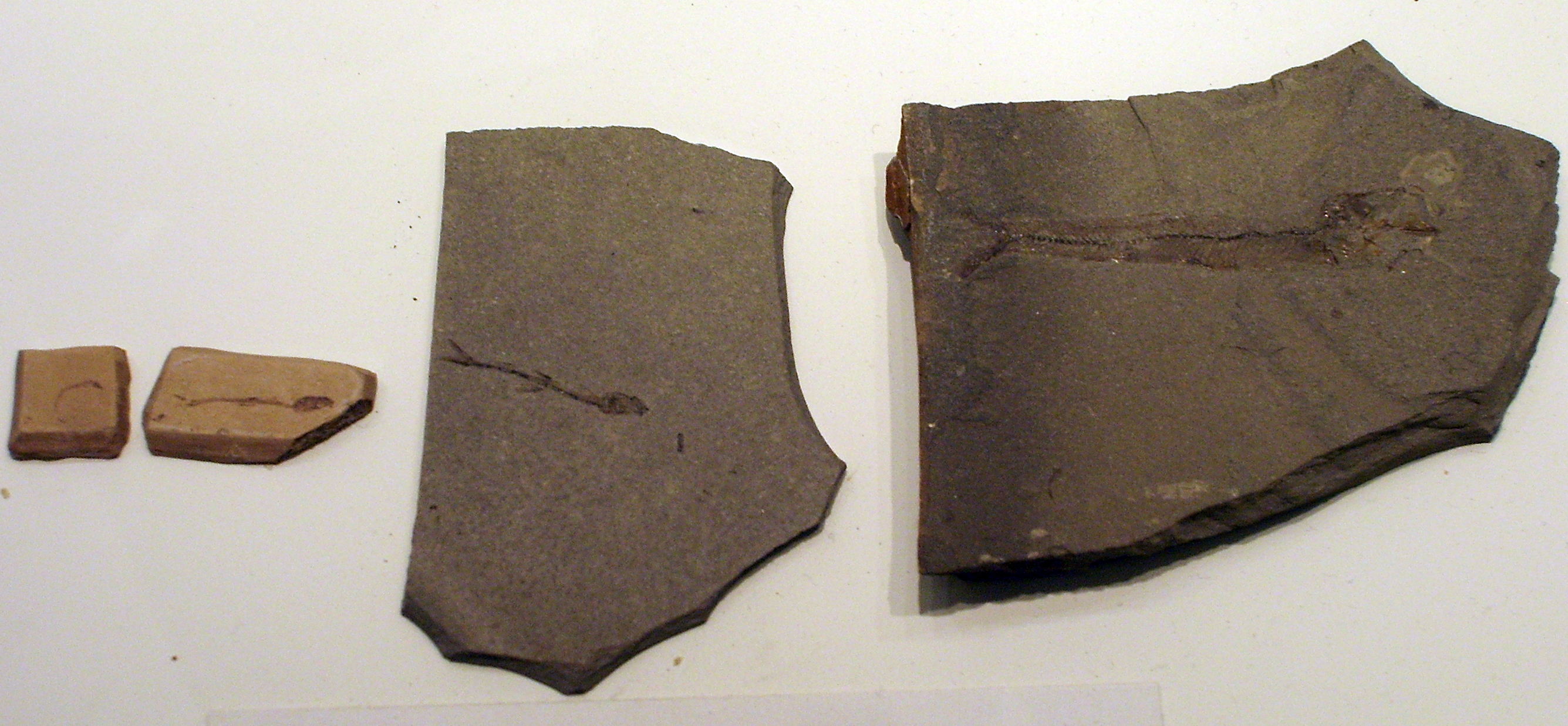
Ontogenic series of a fossil species of the genus Argentina, the Geological Museum, Copenhagen

They are found in oceans throughout the world. They are small fishes, growing up to 25 centimetres (9.8 in) long, except the greater argentine, Argentina silus, which reaches 70 centimetres (28 in).

They form large schools close to the sea floor, and feed on plankton, especially krill, amphipods, small cephalopods, chaetognaths, and ctenophores.

Several species are fished commercially and processed into fish meal.

The earliest fossil argentinid remains are indeterminate otoliths from the Barremian Kimigahama Formation of Japan. The presence of these fossils in what is thought to have been a shallow-water environment contrasts with the present occurrence of argentinids in deepwater habitats, suggesting that they must have adapted to deep-sea environments later in the Cretaceous. Otoliths assignable to Argentina are known from the Late Cretaceous (Maastrichtian) of the United States and Germany.
