= Alphonse Guichenot =

French zoologist

Antoine Alphonse Guichenot (French pronunciation: [ɑ̃twan alfɔ̃s ɡiʃno]; 31 July 1809 in Paris – 17 February 1876 in Cluny) was a French zoologist who taught, researched, and participated in specimen collecting trips on behalf of the Muséum national d'histoire naturelle (Paris), including an extensive biological survey of Algeria.

His primary fields of research included fish and reptiles. He is credited with describing the ichthyological genera Agonomalus, Neosebastes (gurnard scorpionfishes) and Glossanodon. He also described numerous new species, including the New Caledonian crested gecko, Correlophus ciliatis (changed to Rhacodactylus ciliatus in 1994, but reclassified as Correlophus ciliatis in 2012).

He retired to solely an assistant naturalist position in 1856, and died in 1876 in Cluny, France.

== Tribute ==
Several fish species commemorate his name, an example being Paracanthobrama guichenoti Bleeker, 1864.

He is also commemorated in the scientific name of a species of lizard, Lampropholis guichenoti.

Coreius guichenoti (Sauvage & Dabry de Thiersant, 1874) was also named in his honor.

== Selected works ==
- (1839). Monographie de deux genres de poissons, les lépisostées et les polyptères, de la famille des elupcoïdes de Cuvier, et de celle des siagonotes de Duméril, précédée de quelques considérations sur ces genres.
- (1847). Aperçu géographique sur les poissons du Chile. Rev. Zool., 1847, 10, 333-336.
- (1848). Notice sur l'établissement d'un nouveau genre de Chétodons [Mégaprotodom] Rev. Zool., 1848, 11, 12-14.
- (1848). Peces de Chile (In Gay, Claudio. Historia física v política de Chile. Paris & Santiago, 1848). (in Spanish).
- (1850). Exploration scientifique de l'Algérie. Paris, 1850. pis. 1850.2 Vol. iii, Zoologie. Histoire naturelle des reptiles et des poissons.
- (1859). Notice sur deux espèces nouvelles de poissons du genre Cyprinodon [C- cyanogaster, C. dolmlus] Rev. Mag. Zool., 1859, 2. sér. 11, 377-380.
- (1866). Catalogue des poissons de Madagascar de la collection du Musée de Paris, avec la description de plusieurs espèces nouvelles. Mém. Soc. Sei. Nat. Cherbourg, 1866, 12, 129-148.
- (1866). Le Trigle polyommate, nouveau genre de poissons, (etc.). Ichthyologie. Ann. Soc. Maine-et-Loire, IX. Alphonse Guichenot. Hoplonotus Guichenot, IX, 3; orthotype Trigla Polyommata Rich. Preoccupied in beetles, 1851; replaced by Pterygotrigla Waite (1899) and later by Otohime Jordan & Starks (1905).
- (1866). Le Zancle centrognathe, nouveau genre de Chitodons. Ann. Soc. Maine-et-Loire, IX. Alphonse Guichenot. Gnathocentrum Guichenot, IX, 4; orthotype G. Centrognathum Guich. = Chaetodon Cornutus L . A synonym of Zanclus.
- (1866). L'Argentine leioglosse, nouveau genre de Salmonoides. Ann. Soc. Maine-et-Loire, IX. Glossanodon Guichenot, IX, 9; orthotype Argentina Leioglossa Cuv. & Val.
- (1866). Notice sur un nouveau genre de la famille des Cottoides, etc. Mem. Soc. Sci. Nat. Cherbourg. Agonomalus Guichenot, 252; orthotype Aspidophalus Proboscidalis Val.
- (1867). Notice sur le néosébaste, nouveau genre de poissons de la famille des scorpènoides, et description d'une nouvelle espèce [Neosebastes scorpœnoides Guich.i Mém. Soc. Sci. Nat. Cherbourg, 1867,13, 83-89.
- (1869). Notice sur quelques poissons inédits de Madagascar et de la Chine. Nouv. Arch. Mus. Hist. Nat. Paris, 1869, б, 193-206.

== Taxon described by him ==
- See Category:Taxa named by Alphonse Guichenot
