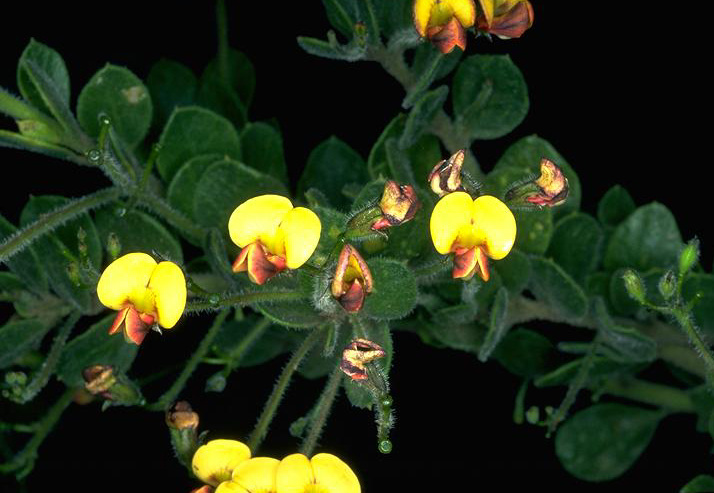
- In the Australian National Botanic Gardens

Conservation status
- Near Threatened (IUCN 3.1)

Scientific classification
- Kingdom: Plantae
- Clade: Tracheophytes
- Clade: Angiosperms
- Clade: Eudicots
- Clade: Rosids
- Order: Fabales
- Family: Fabaceae
- Subfamily: Faboideae
- Genus: Daviesia
- Species: D. mollis

Binomial name
- Daviesia mollis Turcz.

Synonyms
- Daviesia mollis Turcz. var. mollis

= Daviesia mollis =

Species of flowering plant

Daviesia mollis is a species of flowering plant in the family Fabaceae and is endemic to the south-west of Western Australia. It is a small shrub with softly-hairy foliage, scattered elliptic phyllodes, and yellow and reddish flowers.

== Description ==
Daviesia mollis is an intricately branched shrub, typically growing to a height of 40–80 cm (16–31 in) and has softly-hairy foliage. Its phyllodes are scattered, mostly elliptic to more or less round, sometimes with a small sharp point on the end, 9–27 mm (0.35–1.06 in) long and 7–15 mm (0.28–0.59 in) wide. The flowers are arranged in one or two groups of three to five in leaf axils, the groups on a peduncle 14–37 mm (0.55–1.46 in) long, the rachis up to 2 mm (0.079 in) long with bracts 0.5–2 mm (0.020–0.079 in) long at the base, each flower on a pedicel 3–5 mm (0.12–0.20 in) long. The sepals are 4.5–5.5 mm (0.18–0.22 in) long and joined at the base, the two upper lobes joined for most of their length, the three lower lobes triangular and 1.0–1.5 mm (0.039–0.059 in) long. The standard petal is broadly egg-shaped with a notched tip, 8 mm (0.31 in) long, 6.5–7.5 mm (0.26–0.30 in) wide and yellow with a faint red line around the yellow centre, the wings 7–8 mm (0.28–0.31 in) long and reddish with yellow edges, and the keel about 7.5–8.0 mm (0.30–0.31 in) long. Flowering occurs in September and October and the fruit is a triangular pod 10–11 mm (0.39–0.43 in) long.

== Taxonomy and naming ==
Daviesia mollis was first formally described in 1853 by Nikolai Turczaninow in the Bulletin de la Société Impériale des Naturalistes de Moscou. The specific epithet (mollis) means "soft".

== Distribution and habitat ==
This daviesia grows in heath with Eucalyptus pleurocarpa and is found near Ravensthorpe, the Fitzgerald River National Park and the Stirling Range, in the Esperance Plains biogeographic region of south-western Western Australia.

== Conservation status ==
Daviesia mollis is listed as "not threatened" by the Department of Biodiversity, Conservation and Attractions. However it is listed as "Near Threatened" on the IUCN Red List due to its restricted distribution and being fragmented into about 10 locations.
