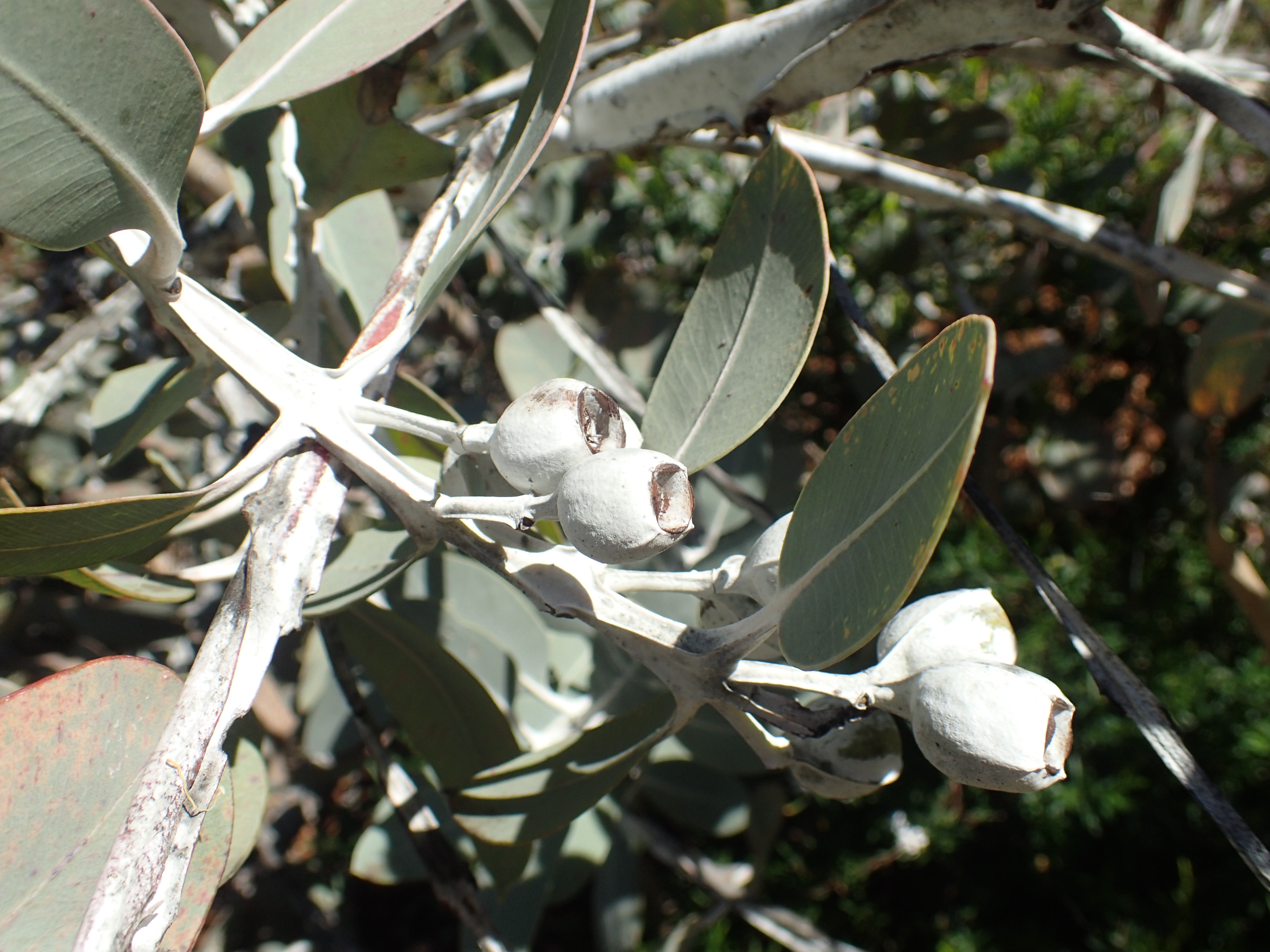
- Foliage and fruit of Eucalyptus pleurocarpa in Kings Park

Conservation status
- Vulnerable (IUCN 3.1)

Scientific classification
- Kingdom: Plantae
- Clade: Tracheophytes
- Clade: Angiosperms
- Clade: Eudicots
- Clade: Rosids
- Order: Myrtales
- Family: Myrtaceae
- Genus: Eucalyptus
- Species: E. pleurocarpa

Binomial name
- Eucalyptus pleurocarpa Schauer

Synonyms
- Eucalyptus eyreana L.A.S.Johnson & K.D.Hill MS; Eucalyptus × tetragona (R.Br.) F.Muell. p.p.; Eudesmia tetragona R.Br.

= Eucalyptus pleurocarpa =

Tallerack

Species of eucalyptus

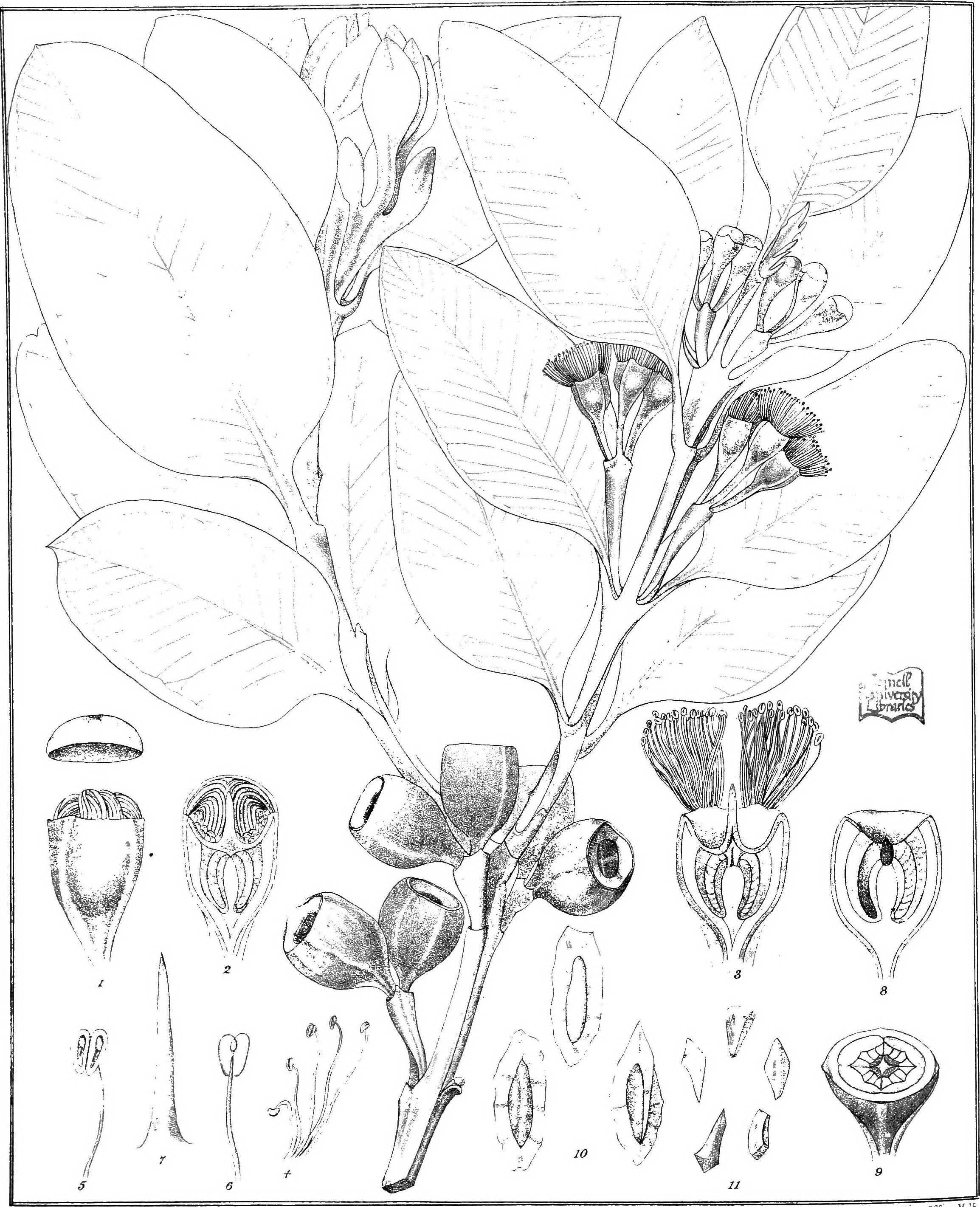
Eucalyptus pleurocarpa from "Eucalyptographia. A descriptive atlas of the eucalypts of Australia and the adjoining islands" (1879)

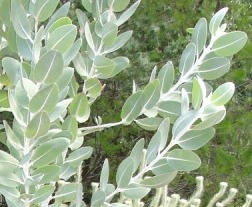
Eucalyptus pleurocarpa foliage

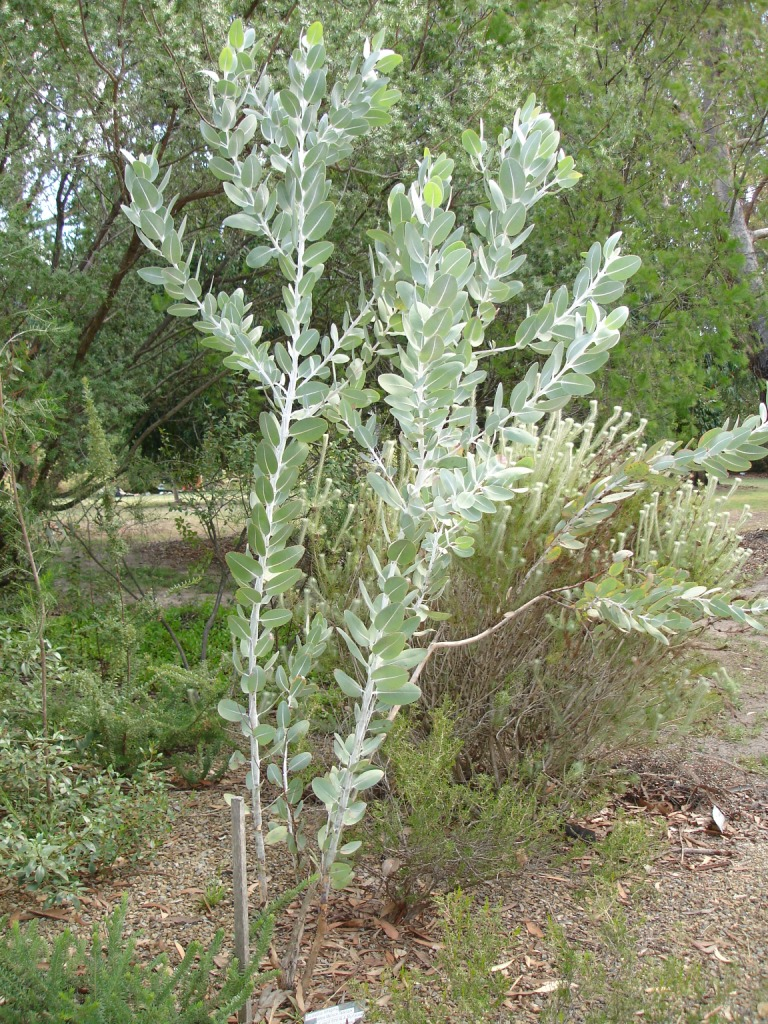
Juvenile specimen in Maranoa Gardens

Eucalyptus pleurocarpa, commonly known as tallerack, talyerock or tallerack is a species of mallee that is endemic to the southwest of Western Australia. It has smooth bark, broadly lance-shaped to elliptical, grey or glaucous leaves that are arranged more or less in opposite pairs, flower buds in groups of seven, whitish flowers and glaucous, barrel-shaped fruit. It is easily recognised in the field by its form, large, white, waxy leaves and, when in flower, its stamens clustered in four groups.

== Description ==
Eucalyptus pleurocarpa is a mallee that typically grows to 2–5 m (6 ft 7 in – 16 ft 5 in) high, 3–6 m (9.8–19.7 ft) wide and forms a lignotuber and has smooth bark. It has a spreading to erect, straggly habit with many thin stems with smooth, greyish bark. The foliage is thick, leathery and waxy with a bluish grey colour and the flower buds, fruit and stems are white and waxy. Young plants and coppice regrowth have stems that are square in cross-section with a wing on each corner, egg-shaped to oblong or elliptical to heart-shaped, 100–120 mm (3.9–4.7 in) long and 60–65 mm (2.4–2.6 in) wide, petiolate and arranged in opposite pairs. Adult leaves are very similar to the juvenile leaves, arranged more or less in opposite pairs, the same dull greyish green on both sides, broadly lance-shaped to egg-shaped or elliptical, 45–140 mm (1.8–5.5 in) long and 25–70 mm (0.98–2.76 in) wide on a petiole 8–20 mm (0.31–0.79 in) long. The flower buds are arranged in leaf axils in groups of three on a flattened, unbranched peduncle 6–18 mm (0.24–0.71 in) long, the individual buds on pedicels 2–8 mm (0.079–0.315 in) long. Mature buds are oval, 8–13 mm (0.31–0.51 in) long and 5–9 mm (0.20–0.35 in) wide with a four-sided floral cup, a rounded operculum and the stamens in four clusters. Flowering occurs from January to April or from October to December and the flowers are whitish. The fruit is a woody, barrel-shaped to cubic, four-angled capsule 12–22 mm (0.47–0.87 in) long and 14–20 mm (0.55–0.79 in) wide.

== Taxonomy and naming ==
Eucalyptus pleurocarpa was first formally described in 1844 by Johannes Conrad Schauer in Lehmann's book, Plantae Preissianae from specimens collected near Cape Riche. In 1867 George Bentham mentioned it as a synonym of Eucalyptus × tetragona, previously described by Ferdinand von Mueller, based on Robert Brown's Eudesmia tetragona. Eucalyptus pleurocarpa has been regarded as a synonym of E. tetragona including in the Flora of Australia in 1988. The specific epithet (pleurocarpa) is from ancient Greek meaning "a rib" and "-fruited".

The type specimen for the subgenus Eudesmia is also the type specimen for E. tetragona but because that type is intermediate between the glaucous E. pleurocarpa and the non-glaucous E. extrica, and because the name E. pleurocarpa was published before E. tetragona, the name Eucalyptus tetragona is no longer accepted at the Australian Plant Census.

The Noongar names for the species are talyerock or tallerack.

The species name for the plant pleurocarpa is from the Greek words pleura meaning rib and carpos meaning fruit - because of the ribbed fruits.

The species belongs to the sub-genus Eudesmia which all have the stamens in four bundles each at the corner of the square-shaped flower. The sub-group also includes E. erythrocorys

== Distribution and habitat ==
Eucalyptus pleurocarpa is found at two different locations on the undulating sandplains of south-western Western Australia from Eneabba in the Wheatbelt region in the north and between Albany and Esperance in the Great Southern and Goldfields-Esperance regions to the south.

It grows in grey to white sandy soils, often also containing gravel. It is emergent and conspicuous in shrubby heath-land communities. Associated eucalypt species include E. decipiens, E. falcata, E. hebetifolia, E. incrassata, E. thamnoides, E. uncinata and E. wandoo.

== Conservation status ==
This eucalypt is classified as "not threatened" by the Western Australian Government Department of Parks and Wildlife. The IUCN Red List assesses the species as Vulnerable.

== Use in horticulture ==
Like most mallees, the species is well suited to arid and semi-arid environments.

The plant is sold commercially as an ornamental plant and the flowers and foliage are used as cut flowers. It is drought tolerant but is susceptible to frost and can grow in a range of soils in a full sun position.

== See also ==
- List of Eucalyptus species
