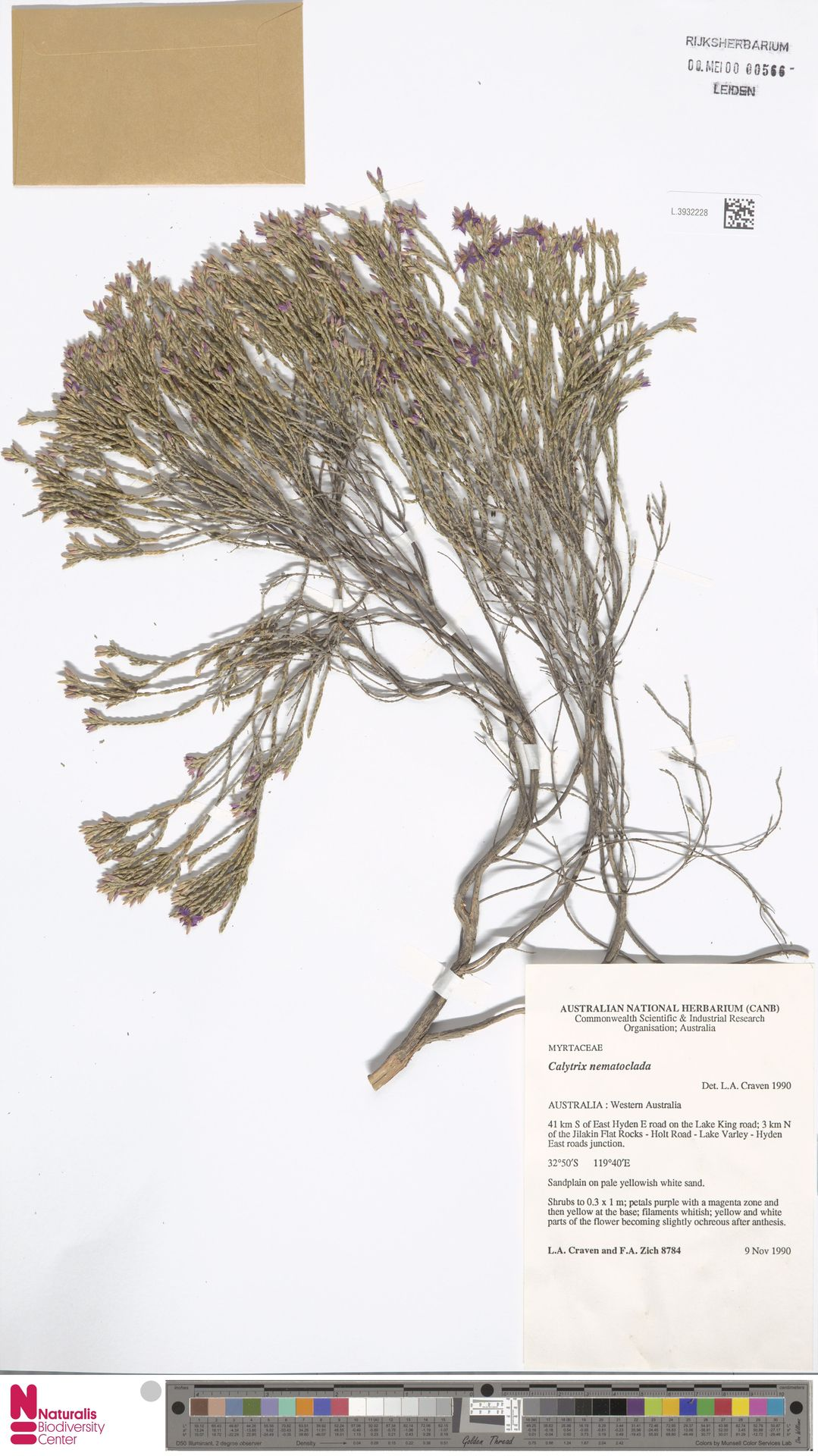
- Holotype in the Australian National Herbarium

Conservation status
- Priority Three — Poorly Known Taxa (DEC)

Scientific classification
- Kingdom: Plantae
- Clade: Tracheophytes
- Clade: Angiosperms
- Clade: Eudicots
- Clade: Rosids
- Order: Myrtales
- Family: Myrtaceae
- Genus: Calytrix
- Species: C. nematoclada

Binomial name
- Calytrix nematoclada Craven

Synonyms
- Lhotskya ciliata Benth.; Lhotzkya ciliata Benth. orth. var.

= Calytrix nematoclada =

Species of flowering plant

Calytrix nematoclada is a species of flowering plant in the myrtle family Myrtaceae and is endemic to the south-west of Western Australia. It is a shrub with decussate, narrowly elliptic to egg-shaped leaves and purple or deep pink flowers with about 35 to 40 stamens in three rows.

== Description ==
Calytrix nematoclada is a shrub that typically grows to a height of up to 15–50 cm (5.9–19.7 in) and has hairy branchlets. Its leaves are decussate, narrowly elliptic to egg-shaped, 1.5–3 mm (0.059–0.118 in) long, 0.5–1 mm (0.020–0.039 in) wide and sessile. There are no stipules at the base of the petiole. The flowers are borne on a funnel-shaped peduncle 3.5–5.0 mm (0.14–0.20 in) long with egg-shaped to more or less round lobes 1.0–1.5 mm (0.039–0.059 in) long. The floral tube is cone-shaped with the narrower end towards the base, 2.5–3.5 mm (0.098–0.138 in) long and has 10 ribs. The sepals are fused at the base, with egg-shaped or elliptic lobes 0.75–1.0 mm (0.030–0.039 in) long and 1.3–1.5 mm (0.051–0.059 in) wide. The petals are purple or deep pink, elliptic to egg-shaped, 5.0–6.5 mm (0.20–0.26 in) long and 2.75–3.0 mm (0.108–0.118 in) wide, and there are about 35 to 40 stamens in three rows. Flowering occurs from November to January.

== Taxonomy ==
Calytrix nematoclada was first formally described in 1987 by Lyndley Craven in the journal Brunonia. The specific epithet (nematoclada) means 'thread-like branchlets'.

== Distribution and habitat ==
This species of Calytrix grows in heath with Actinostrobus on sand, with Eucalyptus tetragona in low scrub, and with E. incrassata in tall open shrubland in the Bendering-Lake King-Ongerup area in the Esperance Plains and Mallee bioregions of south-western Western Australia.

== Conservation status ==
Calytrix nematoclada is listed as "Priority Three" by the Government of Western Australia Department of Biodiversity, Conservation and Attractions meaning that it is poorly known and known from only a few locations but is not under imminent threat.
