= Operculum =

Operculum may refer to:

== Human biology ==
- Operculum (brain), the part of the brain covering the insula
- Operculum (dentistry), a small flap of tissue which may cover an erupting or partially erupted molar
- Cervical mucus plug, the cervical mucus plug that blocks the cervix of the uterus after conception

== Animal biology ==
- Operculum (animal), a structure resembling a lid or a small door that opens and closes
- Operculum (bird), a structure which covers the nares of some birds
- Operculum (bryozoa), a lid on the orifice of some bryozoans
- Operculum (fish), a flap covering the gills of bony fish
- Operculum (gastropod), a sort of trapdoor used to close the aperture of some snails
- Operculum papillare, the iris found in the eyes of elasmobranchs (skates, sharks, and rays)
- Batrachian operculum, an ossicle of the middle ear in some amphibians.
- The anterior end of the puparium in some insects, through which the adult emerges; for example the wasp Stenogastrinae

== Botany ==
- Operculum (botany), various lids and flaps pertaining to plants, algae, and fungi

== See also ==
- Dehiscence (botany), the opening of a plant structure, such as a fruit, anther, or sporangium, to release its contents
