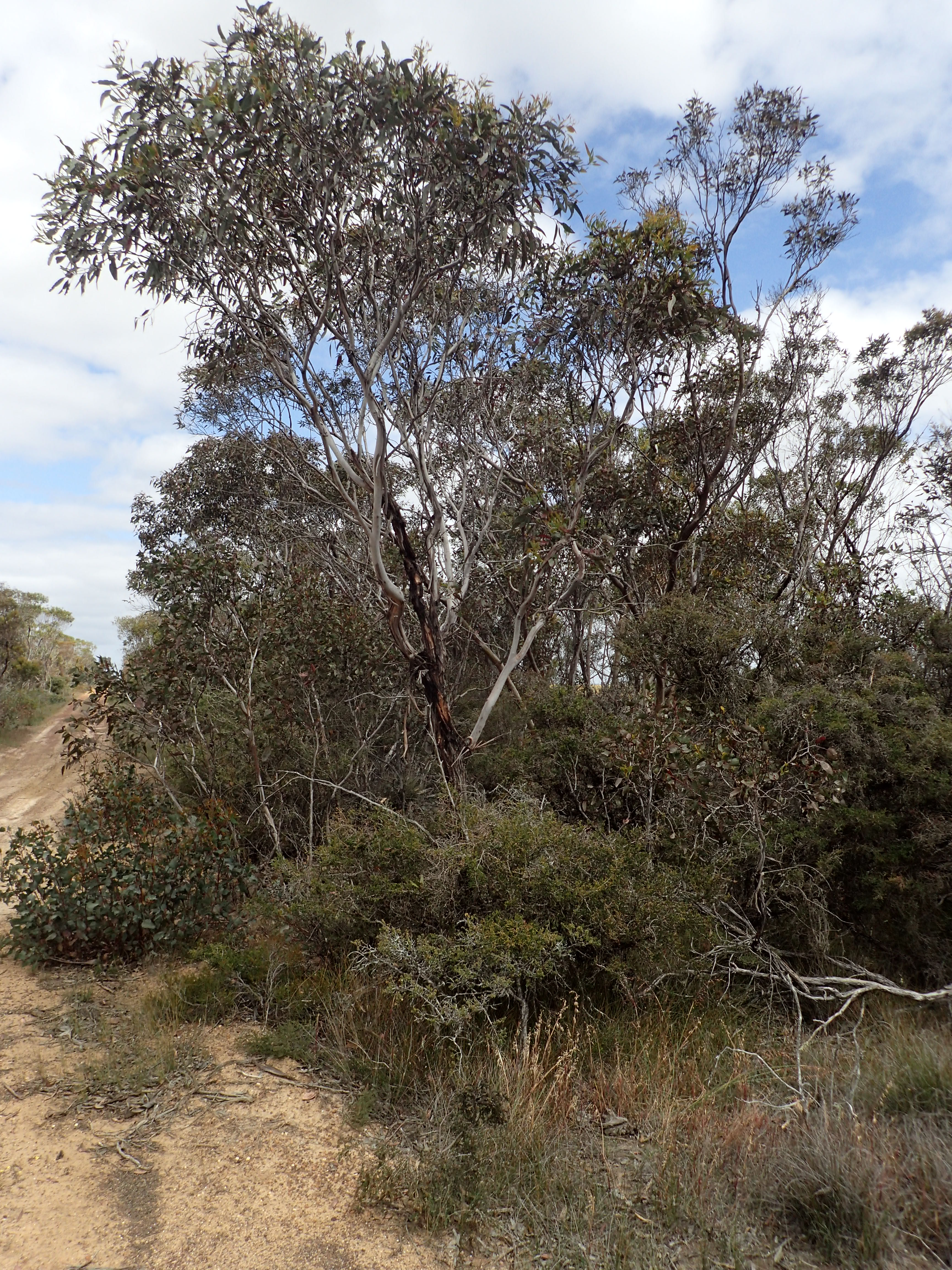
- Eucalyptus hebetifolia near the Stirling Range National Park

Conservation status
- Vulnerable (IUCN 3.1)

Scientific classification
- Kingdom: Plantae
- Clade: Tracheophytes
- Clade: Angiosperms
- Clade: Eudicots
- Clade: Rosids
- Order: Myrtales
- Family: Myrtaceae
- Genus: Eucalyptus
- Species: E. hebetifolia

Binomial name
- Eucalyptus hebetifolia Brooker & Hopper

Synonyms
- Eucalyptus medialis Brooker & Hopper

= Eucalyptus hebetifolia =

Species of eucalyptus

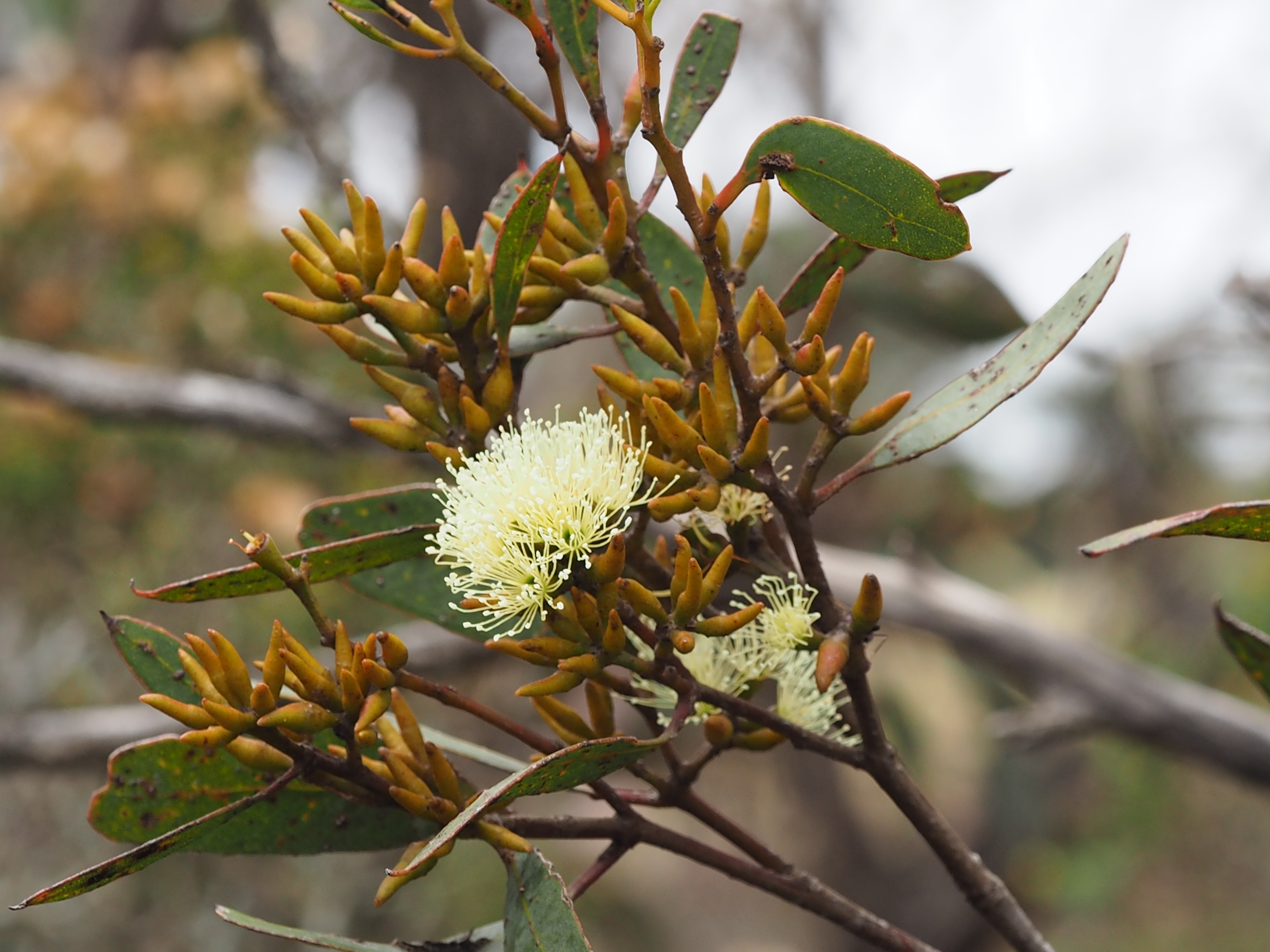
Flower buds and flowers

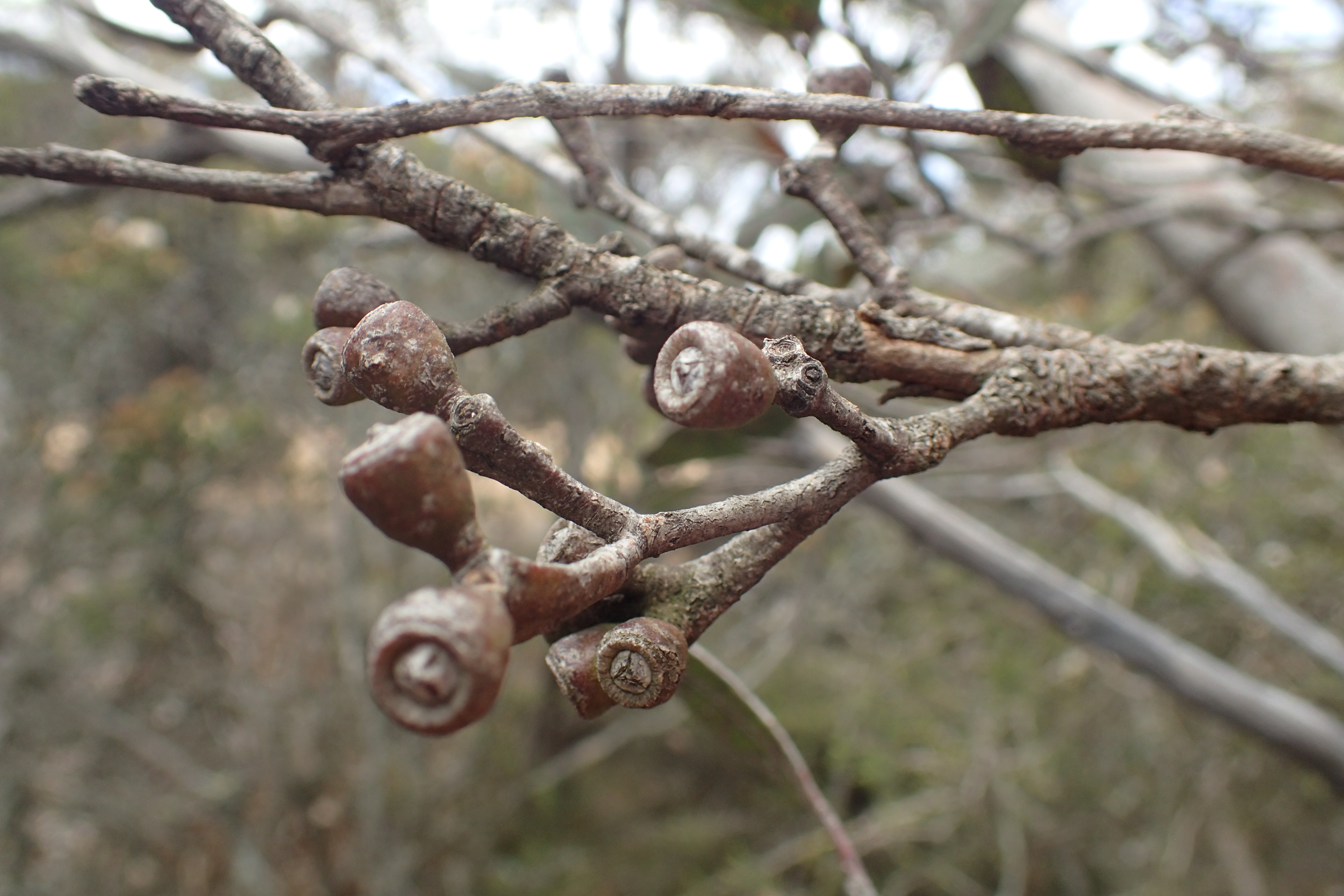
Fruit

Eucalyptus hebetifolia is a species of mallee that is endemic to southern Western Australia. It has smooth grey and brownish bark with loose ribbons of bark near the base, lance-shaped adult leaves, flower buds in groups of up to thirteen, creamy white flowers and conical to barrel-shaped fruit.

== Description ==
Eucalyptus hebetifolia is a mallee that typically grows to a height of 3 to 8 metres (10 to 26 ft) and has loose, rough bark on the lower half of the trunk, smooth grey and brownish bark above. Young plants and coppice regrowth have broadly lance-shaped leaves 50–95 mm (2.0–3.7 in) long and 17–53 mm (0.67–2.09 in) wide. Adult leaves are lance-shaped, the same dull bluish green on both sides, 70–90 mm (2.8–3.5 in) long and 10–17 mm (0.39–0.67 in) wide on a petiole 9–20 mm (0.35–0.79 in) long. The flower buds are arranged in leaf axils in groups of up to thirteen on an unbranched peduncle 10–15 mm (0.39–0.59 in) long, the individual buds on pedicels 2–3 mm (0.079–0.118 in) long. Mature buds are spindle-shaped, 10–16 mm (0.39–0.63 in) long and 2.5–4 mm (0.098–0.157 in) wide with a conical operculum about twice as long as the floral cup. Flowering occurs between December and March and the flowers are creamy white or very pale yellow. The fruit is a woody barrel-shaped to conical capsule 6–8 mm (0.24–0.31 in) long and 5–6 mm (0.20–0.24 in) wide with the valves near rim level.

== Taxonomy and naming ==
Eucalyptus hebetifolia was first formally described in 1991 by Ian Brooker and Stephen Hopper from a specimen collected near Tincurrin. The description was published in the journal Nuytsia. The specific epithet hebetifolia is derived from the Latin hebes, 'dull' and folium, 'leaf', referring to the dull leaves that contrast with those of E. phaenophylla.

== Distribution and habitat ==
This mallee grows on higher ground in undulating terrain in sandy-loamy soils over laterite, mainly in the central wheatbelt.

== Conservation status ==
Eucalyptus hebetifolia is classified as "not threatened" by the Western Australian Government Department of Parks and Wildlife.

== See also ==
- List of Eucalyptus species
