= Eucalyptus thamnoides =

Conservation status
- Vulnerable (IUCN 3.1)

Scientific classification
- Kingdom: Plantae
- Clade: Tracheophytes
- Clade: Angiosperms
- Clade: Eudicots
- Clade: Rosids
- Order: Myrtales
- Family: Myrtaceae
- Genus: Eucalyptus
- Species: E. thamnoides

Binomial name
- Eucalyptus thamnoides Brooker & Hopper

Species of eucalyptus

Eucalyptus thamnoides, also known as brown mallee, is a species of mallee that is endemic to south western Western Australia. It has smooth bark, lance-shaped adult leaves, flower buds in groups of seven, cream-coloured to pale yellow flowers and cup-shaped, conical or bell-shaped fruit.

== Description ==
Eucalyptus thamnoides is a mallee that typically grows to a height of 1.5–6 m (4 ft 11 in – 19 ft 8 in) and forms a lignotuber. It has smooth, pale grey bark. Young plants and coppice regrowth have dull green to greyish, lance-shaped leaves that are 40–105 mm (1.6–4.1 in) long and 12–30 mm (0.47–1.18 in) wide. Adult leaves are the same shade of glossy green on both sides, lance-shaped, 50–105 mm (2.0–4.1 in) long and 8–20 mm (0.31–0.79 in) wide, tapering to a petiole 8–20 mm (0.31–0.79 in) long. The flower buds are arranged in leaf axils in groups of seven on a flattened, unbranched peduncle 8–25 mm (0.31–0.98 in) long, the individual buds on pedicels 2–5 mm (0.079–0.197 in) long. Mature buds are an elongated oval shape, 13–16 mm (0.51–0.63 in) long and 3–6 mm (0.12–0.24 in) wide with a horn-shaped operculum up to twice as long as the floral cup. Flowering occurs from March to July or November and the flowers are cream-coloured to pale yellow. The fruit is a woody cup-shaped, conical or bell-shaped capsule 6–9 mm (0.24–0.35 in) long and 6–8 mm (0.24–0.31 in) wide with the valves near rim level or protruding.

== Taxonomy and naming ==
Eucalyptus thamnoides was first formally described in 2002 by Ian Brooker and Stephen Hopper in the journal Nuytsia from specimens collected by Brooker near Needilup in 1988. The specific epithet (thamnoides) is derived from the ancient Greek word thamnos meaning "a bush or shrub" with the ending -oides meaning "like", referring to the habit of this species, in contrast to that of E. astringens.

In the same edition of Nuytsia, Brooker and Hooper described two subspecies, and the names have been accepted by the Australian Plant Census:

- Eucalyptus thamnoides subsp. megista Brooker & Hopper differs from the autonym in having larger flower buds and fruit that are up to 12 mm (0.47 in) long and 10 mm (0.39 in) wide;
- Eucalyptus thamnoides Brooker & Hopper subsp. thamnoides has fruit that are 6–8 mm (0.24–0.31 in) in diameter.

== Distribution and habitat ==
Subspecies megista grows on plains and low rises but not on breakaways and occurs between Quairading, the Stirling Range, Cranbrook and Hopetoun. Subspecies thamnoides grows on plains, breakaways, low stony hills and near rivers from near Gnowangerup to the Stirling Range National Park and Jerramungup.

== Conservation status ==
Eucalyptus thamnoides and both subspecies are listed as "not threatened" by the Western Australian Government Department of Parks and Wildlife. The IUCN Red List assesses the species as Vulnerable.

== See also ==
- List of Eucalyptus species
