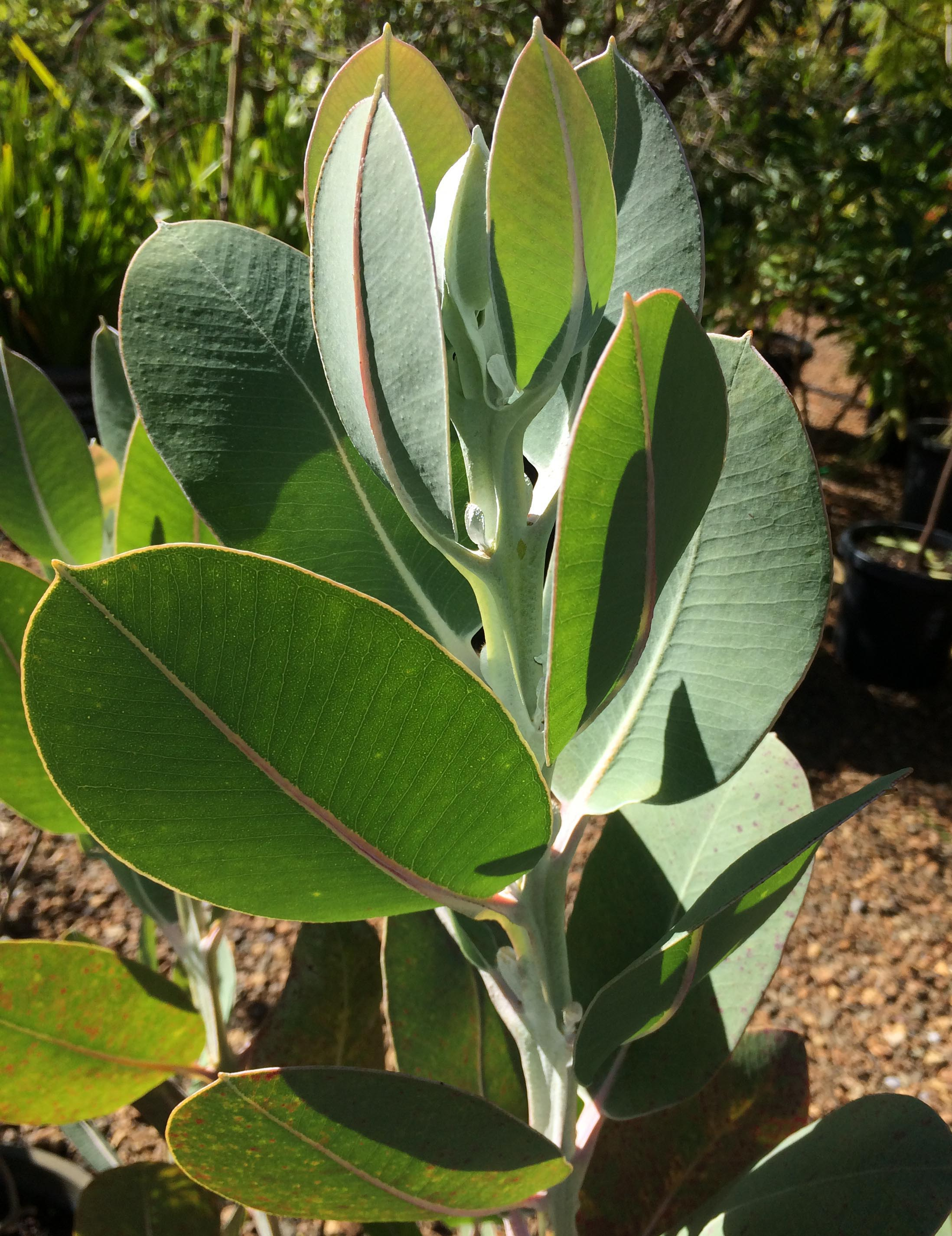
- Foliage of Eucalyptus × tetragona

Scientific classification
- Kingdom: Plantae
- Clade: Tracheophytes
- Clade: Angiosperms
- Clade: Eudicots
- Clade: Rosids
- Order: Myrtales
- Family: Myrtaceae
- Genus: Eucalyptus
- Species: E. × tetragona

Binomial name
- Eucalyptus × tetragona (R.Br.) F.Muell.

= Eucalyptus × tetragona =

Species of eucalyptus

Eucalyptus × tetragona and Eucalyptus tetragona are listed as synonyms of Eucalyptus pleurocarpa at the Australian Plant Census.

Entries in earlier texts The Western Australian Flora, Eucalypts of the Western Australian goldfields (and the adjacent wheatbelt) and Flora of Australia have the earlier assumption of the separate non-hybrid form.
