= Operculum (botany) =

Botanical term for a protective covering, hood or lid

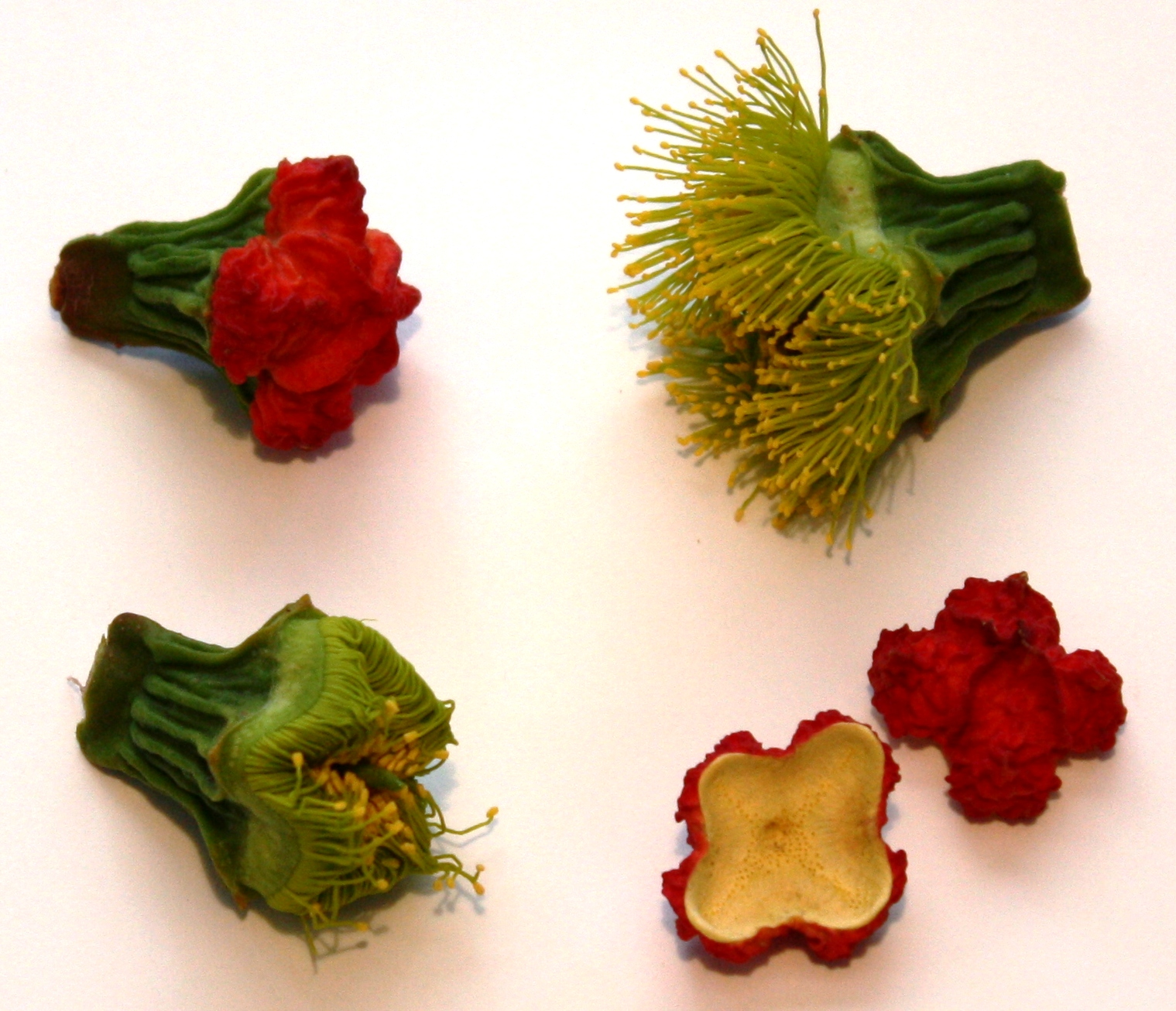
Red operculum of Eucalyptus erythrocorys

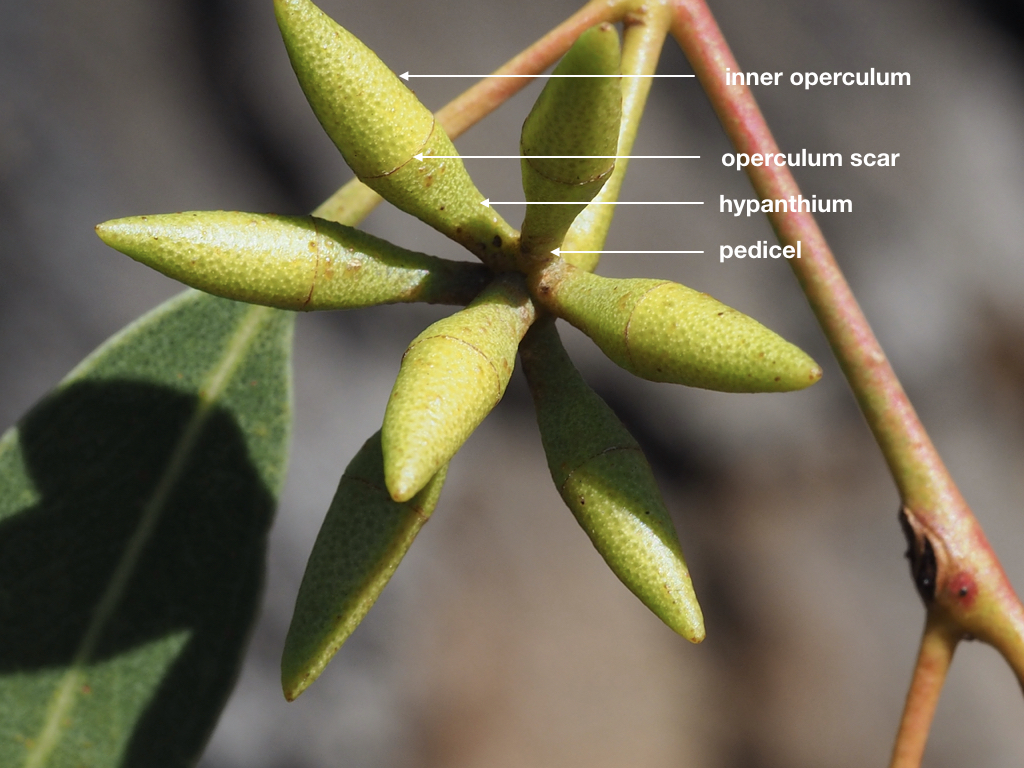
Operculum and scar of Eucalyptus blakelyi

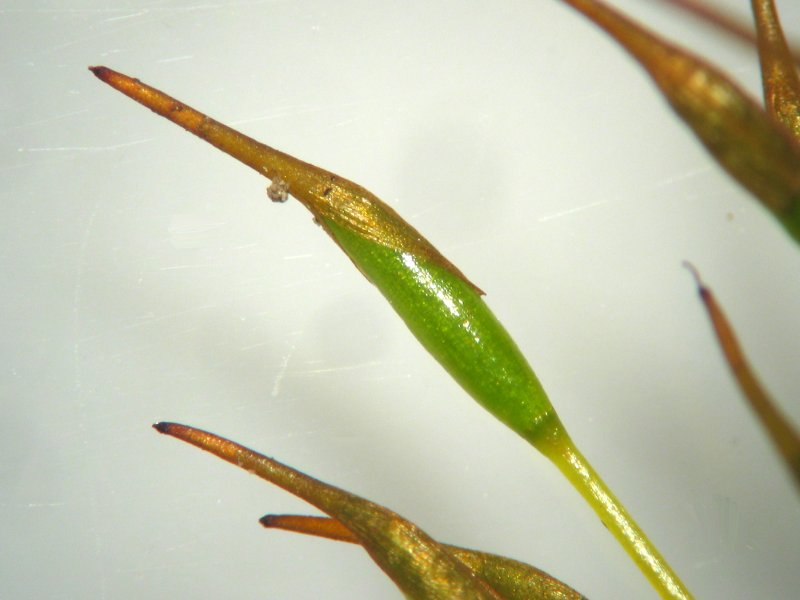
Calyptra of Tortula muralis

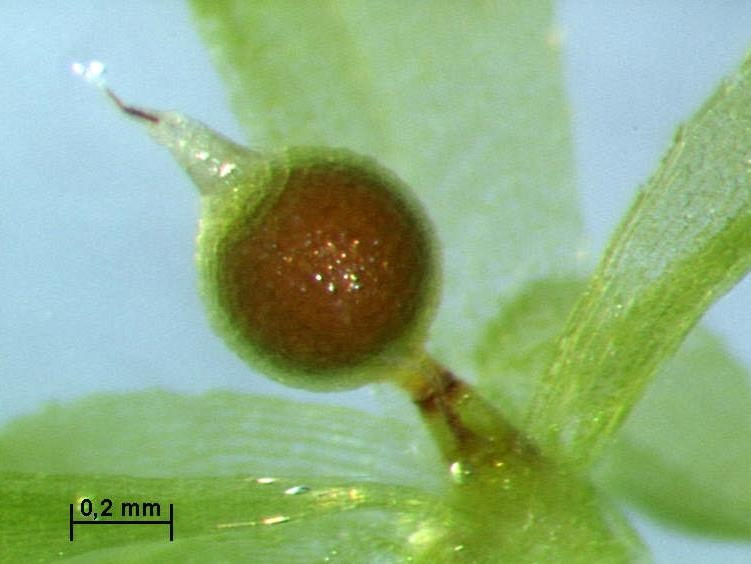
Calyptra on top of the brown spore capsule (sporophyte) of the moss Physcomitrella patens. The brownish archegonial venter is still visible.

In botany, an operculum (pl.: opercula) or calyptra (from Ancient Greek καλύπτρα (kalúptra) 'veil') is a cap-like structure in some flowering plants, mosses, and fungi. It is a covering, hood or lid, describing a feature in plant morphology.

== Flowering plants ==
In flowering plants, the operculum, also known as a calyptra, is the cap-like covering or "lid" of the flower or fruit that detaches at maturity. The operculum is formed by the fusion of sepals and/or petals and is usually shed as a single structure as the flower or fruit matures. The name is also used for the capping tissue of roots, the root cap.

In eucalypts, (including Eucalyptus and Corymbia but not Angophora) there may be two opercula – an outer operculum formed by the fusion of the united sepals and an inner operculum formed by the fusion of the sepals. In that case, the outer operculum is shed early in the development of the bud leaving a scar around the bud. In those species that lack an outer operculum, there is no bud scar. The inner operculum is shed just before flowering, when the stamens expand and shed their pollen.

In some species of monocotyledon, the operculum is an area of exine covering the pollen aperture.

In Plantago, the capsule has an opening covered by an operculum. When the operculum falls, the seed is sticky and is easily carried by animals that come into contact with it.

Pitcher plants have an operculum above the pitcher that serves to keep out rainwater that would otherwise dilute the digestive juices in the pitcher.

== Bryophytes ==
In bryophytes, the calyptra (plural calyptrae) is an enlarged archegonial venter that protects the capsule containing the embryonic sporophyte. The calyptra is usually lost before the spores are released from the capsule. The shape of the calyptra can be used for identification purposes.

The sporangium of mosses usually opens when its operculum or "lid" falls off, exposing a ring of teeth that control the release of spores.

== Fungi ==
There are two types of sexual spore-bearing asci of ascomycete fungi – those that have an operculum at the top of the ascus, and those that do not.

== See also ==
- Operculum (disambiguation)
